= Shavar (given name) =

Shavar is a given name. Notable people with the given name include:

- Shavar Jeffries (born 1974), American civil rights attorney
- Shavar McIntosh (born 1997), American actor
- Shavar Newkirk (born 1996), American basketball player
- Shavar Ross (born 1971), American actor, film director and screenwriter
- Shavar Thomas (born 1981), Jamaican footballer
