= 1994 Newark mayoral election =

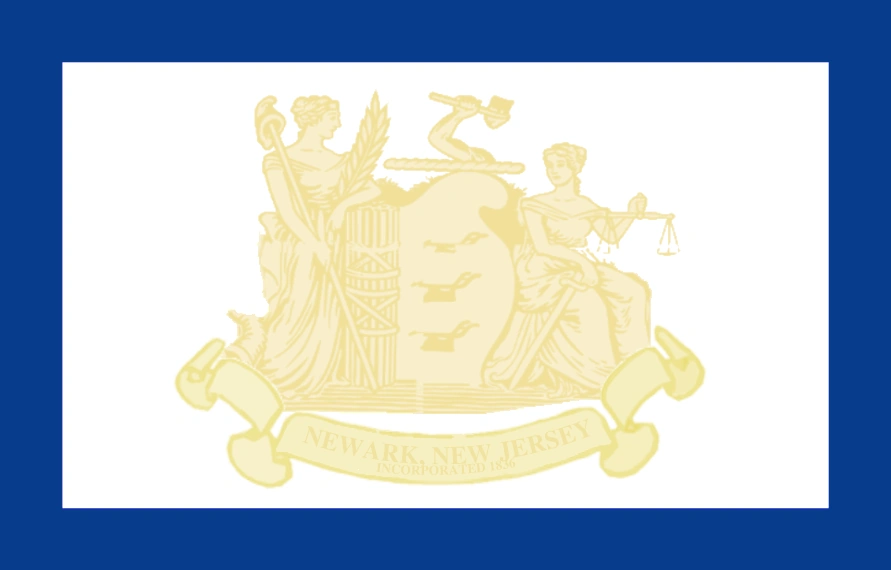
- May 10, 1994
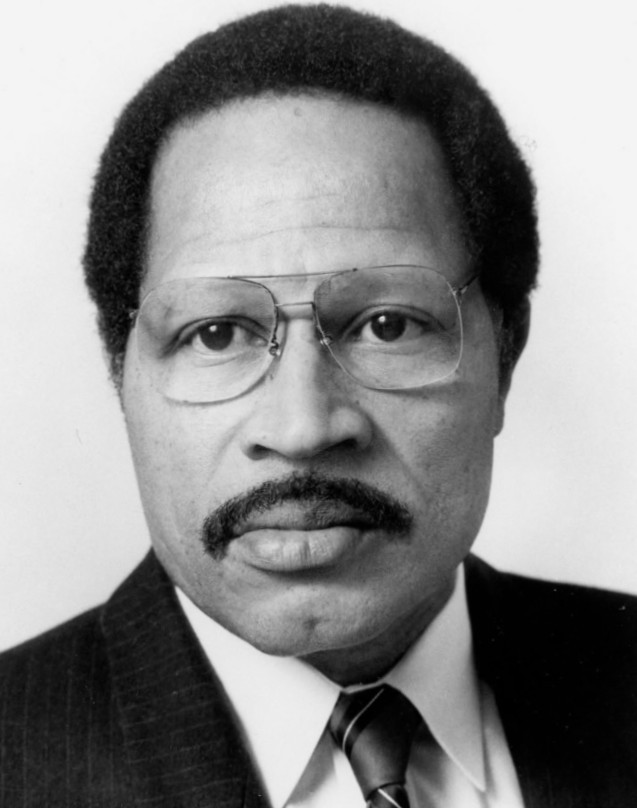

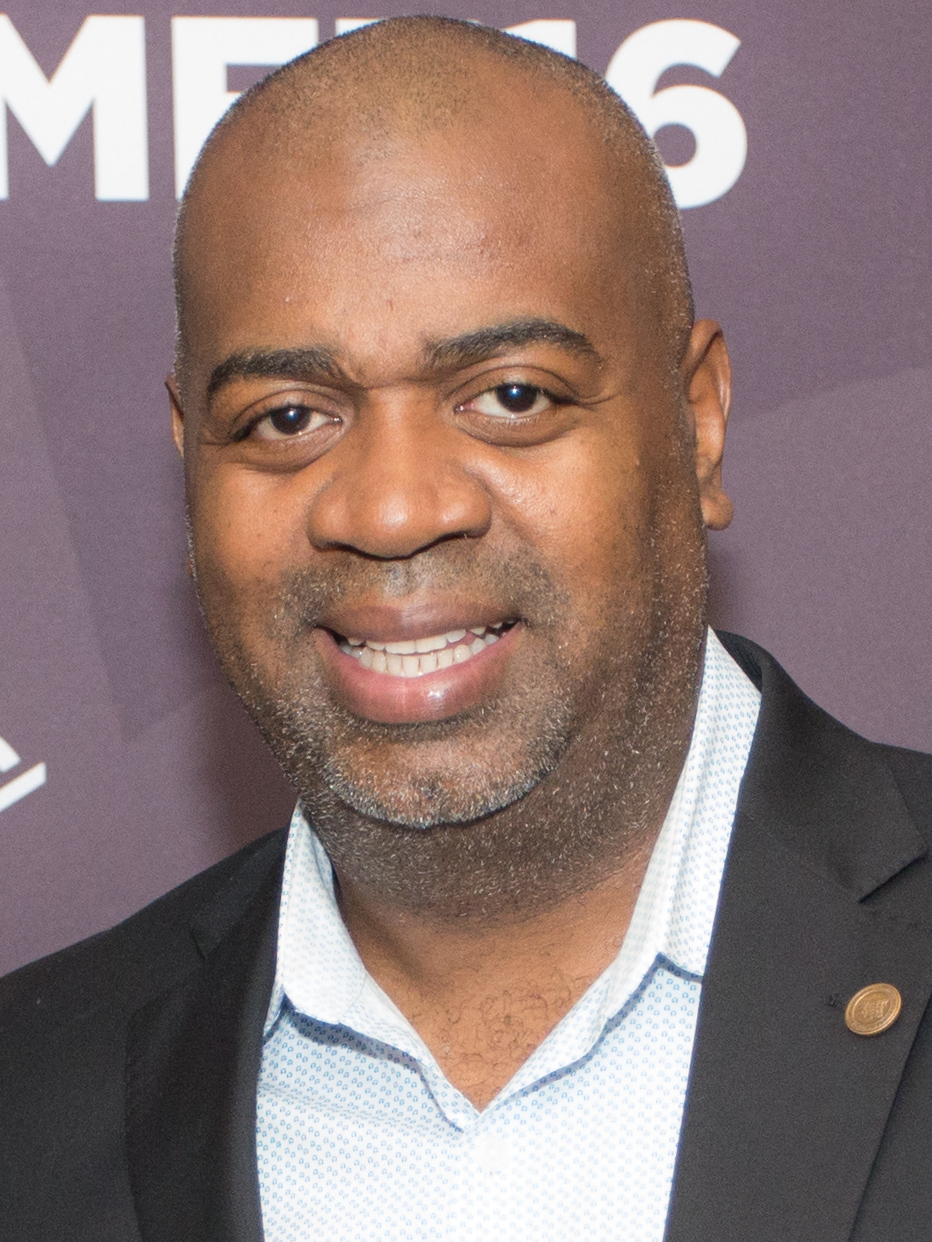

Candidate	Sharpe James	Ras Baraka	Colleen Walton
Party	Nonpartisan	Nonpartisan	Nonpartisan
Popular vote	22,999	3,056	2,934
Percentage	64.0%	8.5%	8.1%
Mayor before election
Sharpe James
Democratic
Elected mayor
Sharpe James
Democratic

The 1994 election for Mayor of Newark took place in Newark, the most populous city in the state of New Jersey, on May 10, 1994. Elections for all seats on the nine-member Municipal Council of Newark were held the same day. A runoff election, if necessary, would have taken place. Elections in the city are non-partisan and candidates are not listed by political party. Incumbent Mayor Sharpe James was re-elected to his third term in office.

Despite his loss, Ras Baraka would successfully run again for mayor of Newark 20 years later.

== Candidates ==
=== Declared ===
- Sharpe James, incumbent Mayor of Newark
- Ras Baraka, author
- Colleen Walton, podiatrist

Though all elections are non-partisan, all candidates are registered Democrats and Newark is a heavily Democratic city.

== Results ==
If no candidate received 50% of the vote, the race would have continued to a run-off between the top two candidates from the first round.

James received 64% of the total vote, securing re-election.

Results
Party	Candidate	Votes	%
Nonpartisan	Sharpe James (incumbent)	22,999	64.0%
Nonpartisan	Ras Baraka	3,056	8.5%
Nonpartisan	Colleen Walton	2,934	8.1%
Total votes		28,989	100.00
