= 2026 Newark mayoral election =

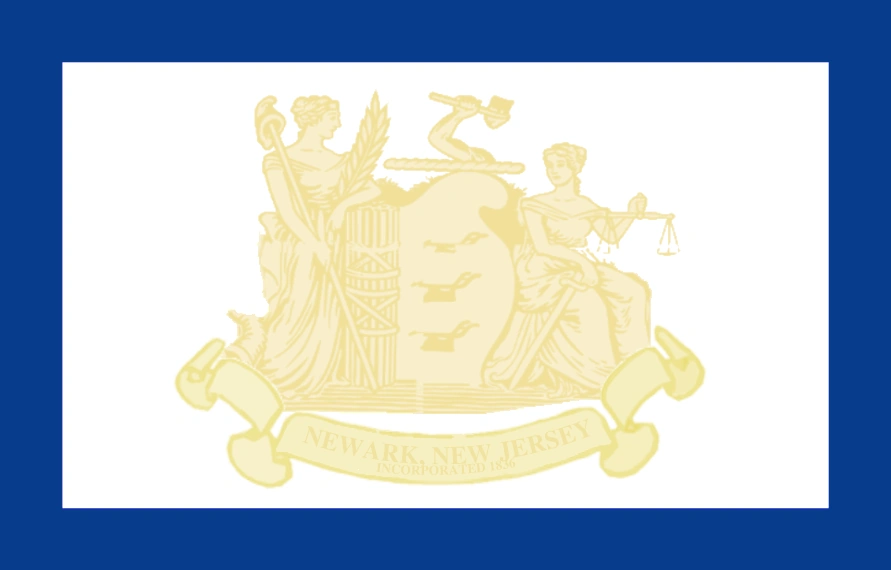
- May 12, 2026
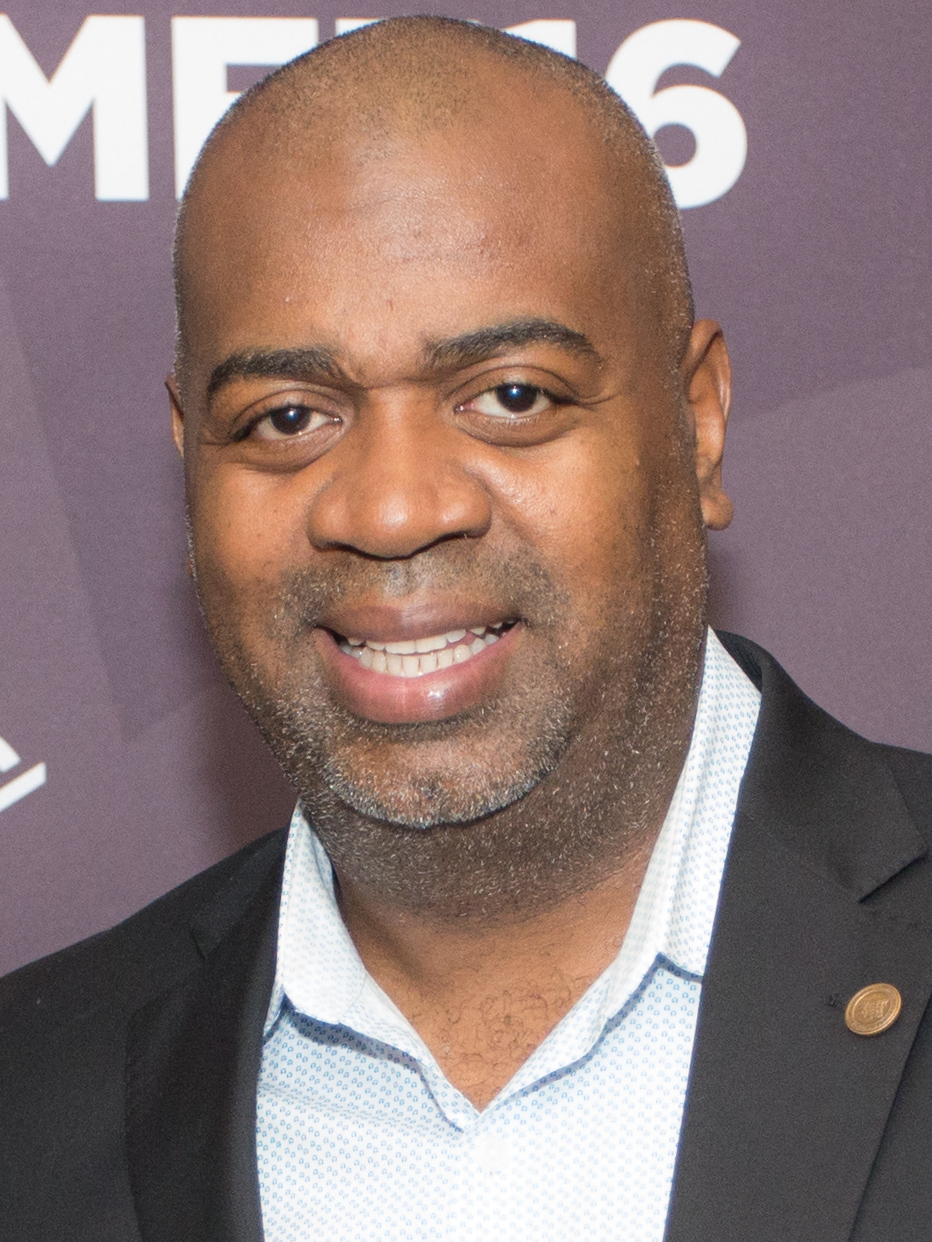

Candidate	Ras Baraka	Jhamar Youngblood
Popular vote	13,661	3,274
Percentage	70.10%	16.80%
Mayor before election
Ras Baraka
Democratic
Elected mayor
Ras Baraka
Democratic

The 2026 Newark mayoral election was held on May 12, 2026, to elect the mayor of Newark, New Jersey. Elections for all seats on the nine-member Municipal Council of Newark will be held on the same day. Elections are non-partisan and candidates were not listed by political party. Incumbent Mayor Ras Baraka won re-election.

== Candidates ==
- Ras Baraka, incumbent mayor of Newark
- Douglas R. Davis
- Tanisha Garner
- Noble Milton, development director
- Sheila Montague, Newark Public Schools teacher, founding member of Parents United for Local School Education, and candidate for mayor in 2022
- Debra Salters, educator
- Nasheedah S. Singleton
- Jhamar Youngblood

=== Endorsements ===
Ras Baraka

Statewide officials

- Mikie Sherrill, New Jersey governor (2026–present)

State legislators

- Shanique Speight, state assemblymember from the 29th district (2018–present)

Local officials

- Quinton Lucas, mayor of Kansas City, Missouri (2019–present)

Individuals

- Lawrence Hamm, civil rights activist

Organizations

- Democratic Mayors Association
- New Jersey League of Conservation Voters
- New Jersey Working Families Party

== Results ==
2026 Newark mayoral election
Candidate	Votes	%
Ras Baraka (incumbent)	13,661	70.10
Jhamar Youngblood	3,274	16.80
Debra Salters	921	4.73
Sheila Montague	653	3.35
Tanisha Garner	321	1.65
Noble Milton	297	1.52
Douglas R. Davis	259	1.33
Nasheedah S. Singleton	102	0.52
Total votes	19,488	100.00
