= LaMonica McIver =

American politician (born 1986)

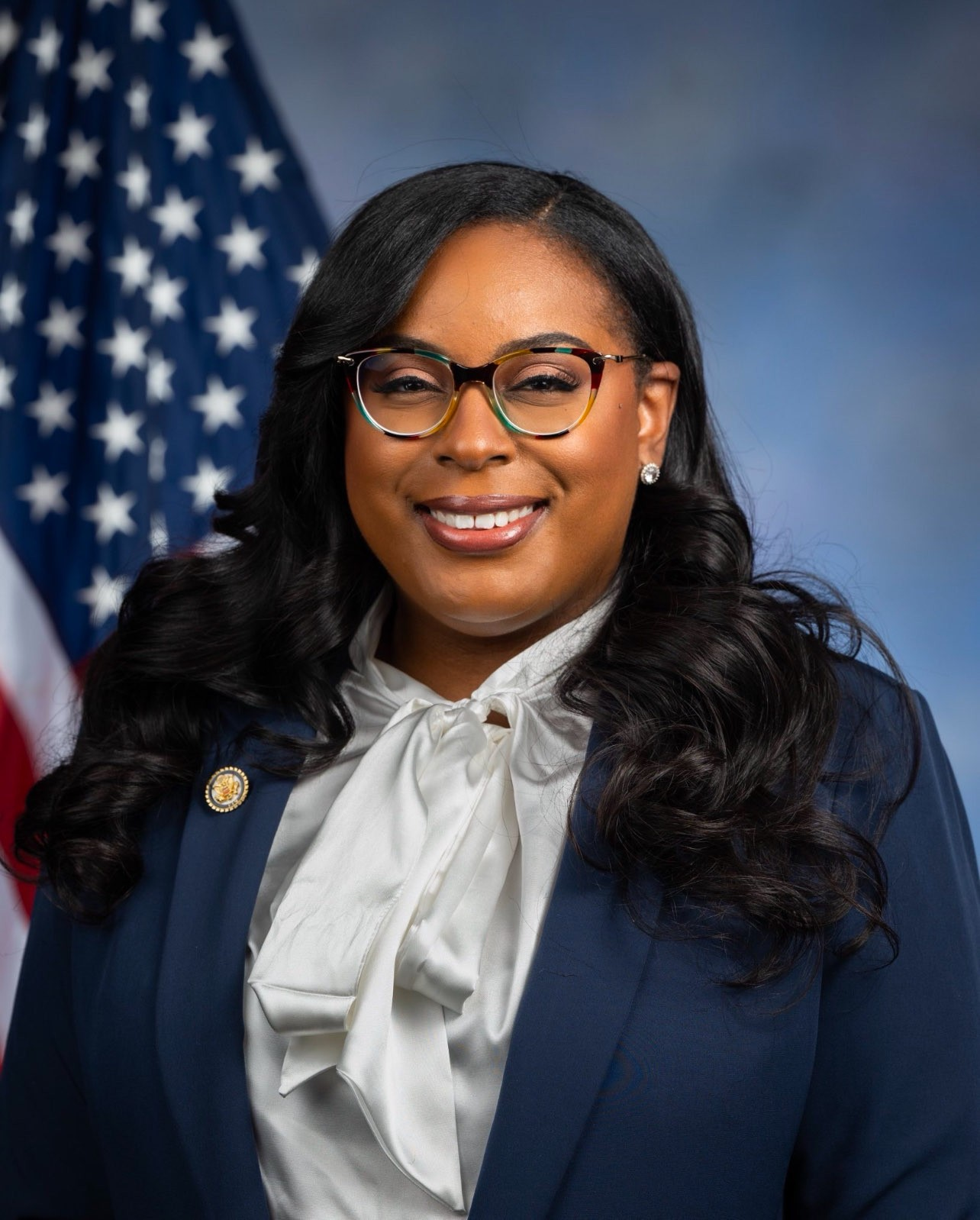
- Official portrait, 2025

Member of the U.S. House of Representatives from New Jersey's 10th district
- Incumbent
- Assumed office September 18, 2024 (Note: McIver's official service begins on the date of the special election, while she was not sworn in until September 23, 2024.)
- Preceded by: Donald Payne Jr.

President of the Newark Municipal Council
- In office July 1, 2022 – September 17, 2024
- Preceded by: Luis A. Quintana
- Succeeded by: Lawrence Crump

Member of the Newark Municipal Council from the Central Ward
- In office July 1, 2018 – September 23, 2024
- Preceded by: Gayle Cheneyfield-Jenkins
- Succeeded by: Amina Bey

Personal details
- Born: June 20, 1986 (age 40) Newark, New Jersey, U.S.
- Party: Democratic
- Spouse: Khalif Thomas (m. 2023)
- Children: 2
- Education: Bloomfield College (BA); Seton Hall University (MA)
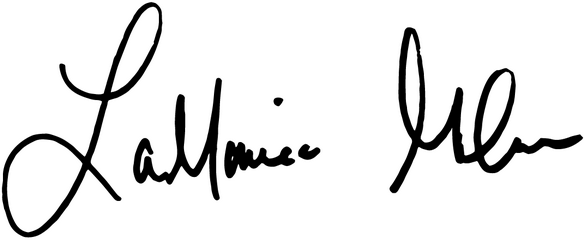
- Signature
- Website: House website Campaign website

LaMonica R. McIver (born June 20, 1986) is an American politician serving as the U.S. representative for New Jersey's 10th congressional district since 2024. A member of the Democratic Party, she served on the Newark municipal council from 2018 to 2024. McIver was first elected to Congress in a September 2024 special election to succeed Donald Payne Jr. in Congress, who died in office in April.

McIver was one of a number of politicians who attempted a legal Congressional oversight visit to a Newark ICE detention facility in 2025. McIver was indicted by a grand jury for "forcibly impeding and interfering with federal officers" during the visit, which carries a maximum sentence of 17 years in prison. She has disputed the charges, claiming that they are political in nature.

== Early life and career ==
McIver was born in Newark, New Jersey, on June 20, 1986, the oldest of four children. She grew up in the city's Central Ward, and graduated from Central High School in 2004. Her mother struggled with substance abuse as McIver was growing up. McIver was the first in her family to attend college, and she graduated from Bloomfield College with a degree in English Literature and from Seton Hall University with a master’s degree in educational leadership and policy. Prior to entering politics, McIver worked as a personnel director for Montclair Public Schools and public affairs manager for Newark's Public Service Enterprise Group. She co-founded a non-profit, Newark G.A.L.S., to foster leadership in young women and girls, and was active with another Newark non-profit, the Believe in Newark Foundation.

Ras Baraka was her fifth grade teacher, and McIver first developed an interest in politics while handing out flyers to support his campaign for city council. The New York Times described Baraka as playing "a key role in shepherding her career".

McIver was elected to the Municipal Council of Newark in 2018 and became its president in 2022. She resigned from the council presidency in 2024 (while remaining a council member) to focus on her congressional campaign.

== U.S. House of Representatives ==
=== Election ===
Following the death of Donald Payne Jr., who represented New Jersey's 10th congressional district in the United States House of Representatives, in April 2024, McIver announced her candidacy in the special election to fill the seat in May. She won the Democratic Party primary election in July and won the general election in September. She was sworn in on September 23, 2024. She won her first full term in the November 5, 2024, general election.

=== Newark immigration detention center incident ===
On May 9, 2025, McIver performed an oversight visit at an Immigration and Customs Enforcement (ICE) detention facility in Newark, along with two other Democratic representatives from New Jersey, Bonnie Watson Coleman and Rob Menendez. Newark Mayor Ras Baraka, who arrived a half hour later, was invited onto the property, where he waited for the congressional delegation. He was later asked to leave, which he did, and he was then arrested for trespassing, though the charges were subsequently dropped. McIver and others attempted to protect Baraka from arrest. On May 19, 2025, interim U.S. Attorney for the District of New Jersey Alina Habba announced that McIver had been charged with assaulting, impeding, and interfering with law enforcement in connection with the incident. The complaint said she slammed her forearm into the body of a federal agent, grabbed an agent to restrain him and pushed an ICE officer and used her forearms to strike him. In a statement released on the same day, McIver said, of the charges, that "they mischaracterize and distort [her] actions, and are meant to criminalize and deter legislative oversight." On May 20, 2025, McIver stated that she rejected a plea deal from the United States Department of Justice. On June 10, McIver was indicted by federal prosecutors led by Habba for her actions at the Newark immigration center. At her arraignment hearing, McIver pleaded not guilty, and Judge Jamel Semper set a trial date of November 10, 2025. On August 27, 2026, the United States Court of Appeals for the Third Circuit denied McIver's motions to dismiss. McIver requested that the full panel of the appeals court weigh that decision but on November 19, 2026, the court denied that request.

On February 4, 2026, McIver expressed her support for abolishing ICE in a CNN interview.

=== Caucus memberships ===
- Congressional Progressive Caucus
- Future Forum

== Electoral history ==
2024 New Jersey's 10th congressional district special election
Party	Candidate	Votes	%	±%
Democratic	LaMonica McIver	26,269	81.17%	+3.53%
Republican	Carmen Bucco	5,126	15.84%	−6.20%
One For All... (Note: In New Jersey, independent candidates are allowed to choose the name of the ballot line they run on.)	Russell Jenkins	515	1.59%	N/A
Creating Real Progress	Rayfield Morton	454	1.40%	N/A
Total votes		32,364	100.00%	
Democratic hold				

2024 New Jersey's 10th congressional district general election
Party	Candidate	Votes	%	±%
Democratic	LaMonica McIver (incumbent)	182,020	74.4%	−6.77%
Republican	Carmen Bucco	54,405	22.2%	+6.36%
Green	Jon Serrano	3,198	1.3%	N/A
Independent	Cynthia Johnson	2,132	0.9%	N/A
Independent	Michelle Middleton	1,686	0.7%	N/A
Independent	Donna Weiss	1,136	0.5%	N/A
Total votes		244,577	100.0	
Democratic hold				

== Personal life ==
McIver married Khalif Thomas in 2023. They have two children. In 2026, McIver wrote about her struggles with fertility due to uterine fibroids, and her decision to use in vitro fertilization for her second pregnancy. She gave birth to her second child in October 2026, one of only 15 representatives to give birth while serving in office, and the second Black congresswoman to do so.

== See also ==
- List of African-American United States representatives
- Women in the United States House of Representatives

== Notes ==
U.S. House of Representatives
Preceded by Donald Payne Jr.	Member of the U.S. House of Representatives from New Jersey's 10th congressional district 2024–present	Incumbent
U.S. order of precedence (ceremonial)
Preceded by Michael Rulli	United States representatives by seniority 361st	Succeeded by Tony Wied
