= 2014 Newark mayoral election =

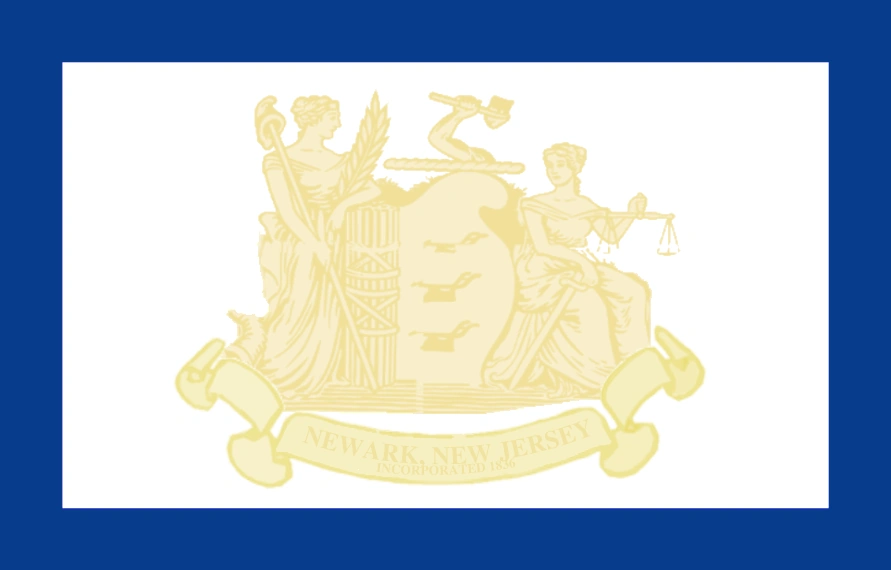
- May 13, 2014
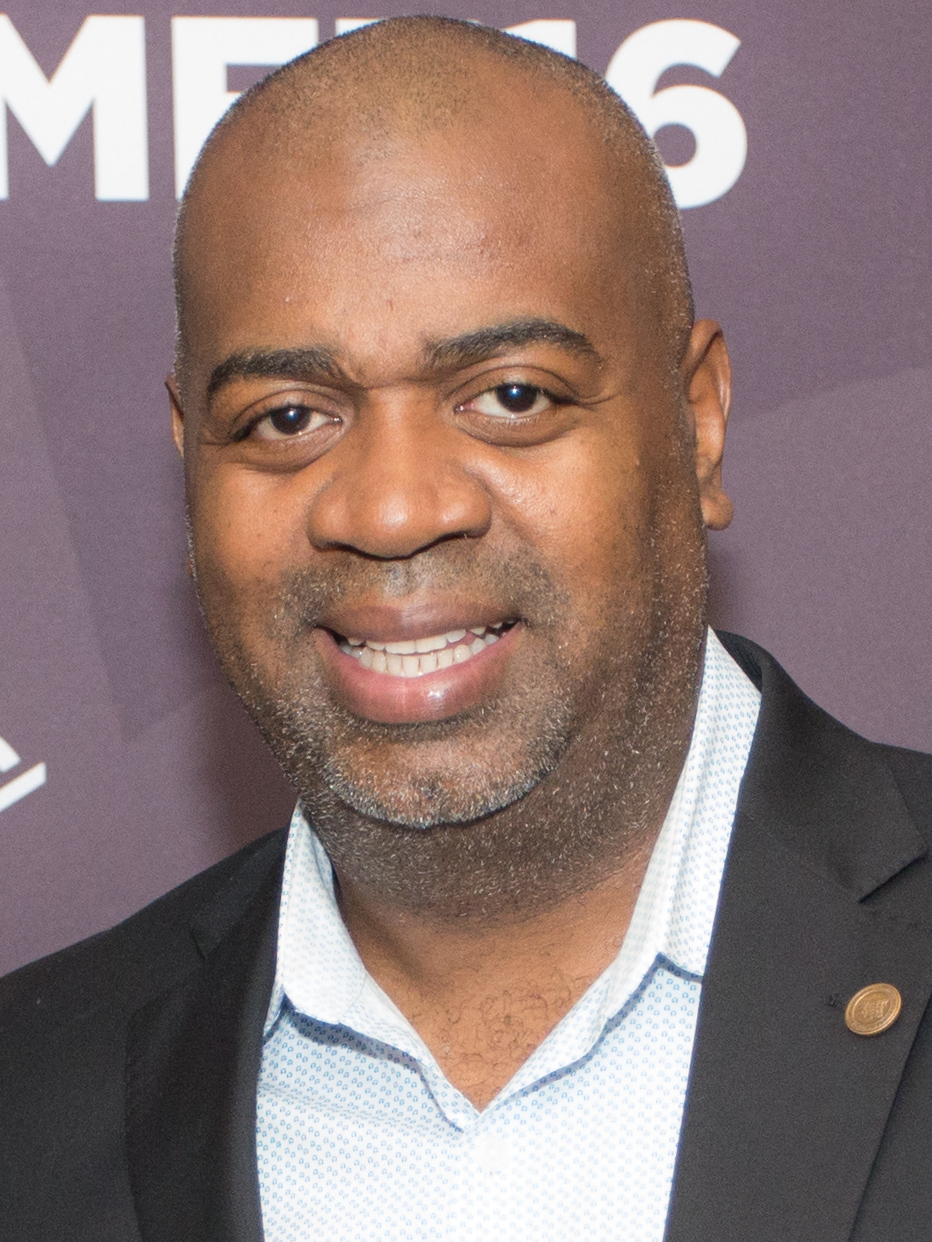

Candidate	Ras Baraka	Shavar Jeffries
Party	Nonpartisan	Nonpartisan
Popular vote	24,358	20,593
Percentage	54.1%	45.7%
Mayor before election
Luis A. Quintana
Democratic
Elected mayor
Ras Baraka
Democratic

The 2014 Newark mayoral election took place in Newark, the most populous city in New Jersey, on May 13, 2014. The race was characterized as a contest between two candidates, Ras Baraka and Shavar Jeffries, both from Newark's South Ward. Elections for all seats on the nine member Municipal Council of Newark also took place. Luis A. Quintana, who had become Mayor of Newark following the resignation of Cory Booker (who had been elected to the United States Senate), did not seek the seat.

The turnout was 45,071 representing 29.59% of registered voters. Shortly after polls closed, Baraka declared victory in the election, with 22,751 votes to 20,260 votes for Shavar Jeffries.

As quoted in the Newark-based newspaper, The Star-Ledger, Rutgers University professor Clement Price characterized the election as the "first mayoral race after the long drama associated with the ending of Mayor Sharpe James' last term and the national ascent of Cory Booker" and "wonders whether the local and national attention in this campaign will be anywhere proximate to the life and times of Cory Booker and Newark." The New York Times characterised the race as a referendum on Booker's approach to running and revitalizing the city, with Baraka considered part of the Newark establishment and Jeffries a new voice in politics in the city.

According to the 2010 Census figures, Newark's demographic breakdown is 33 percent Hispanic-Latino, 52 percent African-American and 26 percent white, .

A number of issues facing the city are influenced by policies implemented by the state government, which exerts direct control of the Newark school district and which monitors the city budget. Its police department is being monitored by the federal government. The management of Newark Watershed, the city's property and water supply, is undergoing reorganisation. While Newark continues to attract new downtown development and its housing stock is being renewed, many residents sense that the neighborhoods still suffer from poor schools, underemployment, and high crime rates.

Both had candidates asked the United States Attorney for the District of New Jersey to monitor voting on election day. They have accused each other's supporters of misconduct, ranging from bullying and intimidation to physical violence. The request was denied. The office of the New Jersey Attorney General monitored the election and reported no major irregularities.

In November 2017 Baraka was accused of violating campaign finance rules, mainly for non-disclosure, by the New Jersey Election Law Enforcement Commission.

== Overview ==
=== Municipal elections ===
As of 2014, there were 152,294 registered voters in Newark. Municipal elections in city are nonpartisan and are held the 2nd Tuesday in May, Nine member Municipal Council of Newark as well as the mayor were chosen. In order to be placed on the ballot candidates must submit petitions with signatures from 1% of the registered voters in the last general election (1,498 for citywide candidates and several hundred for Ward candidates) Relevant 2014 dates:

- January 7 - petitions available
- March 10 - last day to file petitions (64 days prior to election),
- March 18 - ballot positions are drawn
- April 22 - last day for registration and transfer (21 days prior to election)
- May 13 - municipal election
- June 10 - run-off election
- July 1 - swearing-in

=== Candidates ===
Of several candidates who announced their candidacy mayor in 2013, two have been certified: former Assistant State Attorney General Shavar Jeffries and Municipal Council member Ras J. Baraka. Councilmen Anibal Ramos Jr., and Darrin Sharif dropped out of the race on February 12, 2014. Both Baraka and Jeffries are Newark-born and reside in the South Ward.

Jeffries' eight-member All in for Newark council slate includes incumbents East Ward Councilman Augusto Amador, North Ward Councilman Anibal Ramos Jr. and At-large Councilman Carlos Gonzalez and candidates Brian Logan (South Ward). Kevin Waters (West Ward) and Andre Speight (Central Ward). Lynda Lloyd (At-large), and former Assemblyman Wilfredo Caraballo (At-large).

Baraka's Believe in Newark slate for the municipal council are Mildred C. Crump (incumbent councilmember at-large), John Sharpe James (incumbent councilmember-at-large, candidate for the South Ward), Eddie Osborne (at-large candidate). Patrick Council (at-large candidate), Joe McCallum (West Ward candidate) and Gayle Chaneyfield-Jenkins (Central Ward)

=== Demographics ===
At the 2010 United States Census, the population of Newark was 277,140. The racial makeup of the city was 52.35% (145,085) Black or African American, 26.31% (72,914) White, 0.61% (1,697) Native American, 1.62% (4,485) Asian, 0.04% (118) Pacific Islander, 15.22% (42,181) from other races, and 3.85% (10,660) from two or more races.

The percentage of Latinos in Newark grew considerably between 1980 and 2010, from 18.6% to 33.8%; that of blacks has slightly decreased from 58.2% to 52.4%. Hispanics or Latinos of any race were 33.83% (93,746) representing one-third of the population, of which 13% of the total population was Puerto Rican. While municipal elections have seen black-Latino coalitions, voting tends to remain racially polarized.

== Background ==
=== Booker resignation ===
After having won the October 16 special election for U.S. senator to replace the late Frank Lautenberg, Cory Booker resigned as mayor and was sworn in on October 31, 2013 as the junior U.S. senator from New Jersey.

While rules state that any Newark resident can be selected as interim mayor by a vote of the municipal council, normally its president ascends to the post. The resignation of Donald Payne Jr. in November 2012 left the position vacant and the council with eight instead of nine members. Payne's resignation led to a power struggle for the vacant council seat, with opponents contesting Booker's appointment and an eventual judicial rulings which would leave it vacant until November 2013 special election.

=== Quintana term ===
Luis A. Quintana is the longest serving councilman and has allies on both sides of the political divide, which tends to fall along racial lines. Quintana was voted council president on September 19, 2013, in a near-unanimous vote by seven colleagues, with one abstention. He became acting mayor on October 31, 2013, and was sworn in on November 4, 2013, assuming the unexpired term of Booker, Quintana's term ends on June 30, 2014. He has not expressed interest in running for the seat in the 2014 elections. Quintana was seen an ideal "placeholder" for the mayoralty because he "someone who wasn't planning to run and is well-steeped in the minutiae of running Newark." None of the mayoral candidates sought the position since not only "would it be difficult to run the city for the first time while campaigning, it would be hard to demand change in a city while running it". "I am not considering a run for mayor of Newark, and I've said that before,..My only mission is to be the gatekeeper, and to give the citizens of Newark a model for future mayors to come." said Quintana in December 2012. He is running as an unaffiliated candidate for an at-large council seat.

== Major issues ==
=== Budget and state control ===
Newark experienced budget gaps in 2011/2012 and 2012/2013 and received emergency state funding. A memorandum of understanding between Newark and the state requires the city to request and the state approve hiring of city hall staff, conduct timely audits, and submit new budgets for approval. The city will likely require assistance to avoid bankruptcy for the 2013/2014 budget and state has threatened to exert further control over the fiscal matters. The short fall is estimated at $93 million. making state takeover likely.

=== School system and state control ===
Newark is one of 31 "Abbott", or "SDA district" which requires the state to cover all costs for school building and renovation projects in these districts under the supervision of the New Jersey Schools Development Authority. Newark Public Schools population is about 40,000, about half of what it was in 1970. The system was placed under state control in 1994.

Newark Public Schools are underfunded. A new reorganization plan called One Newark spearheaded by state-appointed Newark Schools Superintendent Cami Anderson, would relocate, consolidate or close one quarter of the district's schools that officials say are underutilized. The plan has met with stiff resistance from a large segment of Newark's population, with critics saying there's no evidence it will increase student performance. The plan would also include teacher lay-offs. While candidates agree with many of the policies being implemented in the program, the disregard for community input and the pace of change has drawn criticism.

==== "Facebook money" ====
In 2010, Mark Zuckerberg, founder of Facebook donated $100 million of his personal fortune to the Newark school system. Release of the funds required matching funds, which was mostly raised through the Foundation for Newark's Future and has largely been spent though funds remain. The foundation was short-term philanthropic "shot in the arm", By 2015, FNF and its partners will have spent $200 million.

=== Public safety and police department ===
March 2010 marked the first calendar month in more than 40 years in which the city did not record a homicide. of which there was a total recorded 90 homicides. In that year, the Newark Police Department laid-off 162 officers due to budgetary cuts. 13% of its police force. According to Federal Bureau of Investigation report there were recorded 94 homicides in 2011 and 95 in 2012. In a period ending September 6, 2013 the city saw 10 murders in 10 days, a statistic largely attributed to the reduction of the police force. As of December 27 the murder rate was over 100, the first time it had reached that number in seven years. The 2013 homicide rate total totalled 111, the highest tally since 1990.

In September 2010, the American Civil Liberties Union of New Jersey filed a petition with the Department of Justice in response to recurring complaints of police brutality and abuse. In February 2014 it was reported that pending a consent agreement the department would come under the oversight of a federal monitor.

=== Newark Watershed ===
The Newark Watershed comprises 35,000 acres of reservoirs and water treatment systems for more than 500,000 customers in northern New Jersey including Newark and neighboring Belleville, Elizabeth, Bloomfield and Nutley. It is considered one of the city's greatest assets. A New Jersey State Comptroller report issued in February 2014 revealed irregularities and corruption within the Newark Watershed and Development Corporation, which is the process of being dismantled after being taken over the city.

Both candidates called for a forensic audit of the agency. In March 2014, State Senators Sam Thompson and Ron Rice launched an online petition to urge an investigation into the Newark Watershed.

=== Neighborhood vs. Downtown development ===
Two major projects, the New Jersey Performing Arts Center and the Prudential Center were built during the James-era. During his mayoralty, many of the city's high-rise housing projects were vacated and replaced with low-rise, mixed-income, mixed use and developments.

Booker's mayoralty and personal celebrity drew much media attention to Newark. While he enjoyed high ratings from city residents his legacy has received mixed reviews. While during his tenure there had been millions of dollars of investment in Downtown development, with many projects still to come on line, there is persistent underemployment and high murder rates in many of the city's neighborhoods.

==== "Food desert" ====
A food desert is a neighborhood where there is a shortage of places to buy food. Despite the closure of a new supermarket one year after its opening, several have opened or are planned to open in the city.

== Polling ==
Poll source	Date(s) administered	Sample size	Margin of error	Ras Baraka	Shavar Jeffries	Undecided
Global Strategy Group	May 5, 2014	?	± 4%	38%	34%	28%
Global Strategy Group	April 23–28, 2014	501	± 4.4%	42%	30%	28%
Benenson Strategy Group	April 2014	450	± 4.6%	51%	28%	21%
Global Strategy Group	January 2014	?	± ?	52%	18%	30%

Poll source	Date(s) administered	Sample size	Margin of error	Ras Baraka	Shavar Jeffries	Anibal Ramos Jr.	Ron C. Rice	Undecided
Global Strategy Group	October 7–11, 2012	401	± 4.9%	27%	2%	23%	28%	18%

Hypothetical polling

Poll source	Date(s) administered	Sample size	Margin of error	Cory Booker	Ras Bakara	Undecided
Global Strategy Group	October 7–11, 2012	401	± 4.9%	51%	33%	15%

Poll source	Date(s) administered	Sample size	Margin of error	Cory Booker	Anibal Ramos Jr.	Undecided
Global Strategy Group	October 7–11, 2012	401	± 4.9%	60%	23%	17%

Poll source	Date(s) administered	Sample size	Margin of error	Cory Booker	Ron C. Rice	Undecided
Global Strategy Group	October 7–11, 2012	401	± 4.9%	54%	33%	13%

== Results ==
2014 Newark mayoral election
Party	Candidate	Votes	%
Nonpartisan	Ras J. Baraka	24,358	54.06
Nonpartisan	Shavar D. Jeffries	20,593	45.70
Write-In	Write-in	106	0.24
Total votes		45,057	100.00

== See also ==
- Mayors of Newark, New Jersey
- Municipal Council of Newark
- Street Fight (film)
- Brick City (TV series)
- 2018 Newark mayoral election
