= Mildred C. Crump =

American politician (1938–2024)

President of the Municipal Council of Newark
- In office 2013–2021
- Preceded by: Luis A. Quintana
- Succeeded by: LaMonica McIver
- In office 2006–2010
- Preceded by: Donald Bradley
- Succeeded by: Donald Payne Jr.

Member of the Municipal Council of Newark
- In office 2006–2021
- In office 1994–1998

Personal details
- Born: Mildred Joyce Coleman; November 3, 1938 Detroit, Michigan, U.S.
- Died: December 1, 2024 (aged 86) Newark, New Jersey, U.S.
- Spouse: Cecil Crump (died 1993)
- Children: 2
- Education: Wayne State University; Rutgers University–Newark
- Profession: Educator

Mildred Joyce Coleman Crump (November 3, 1938 – December 1, 2024) was an American politician who served on the Municipal Council of Newark, New Jersey from 1994 to 1998 and again from 2006 to 2021 and is the first Black woman to have served on the city's governing body. She was the first African American Braille teacher in New Jersey. InsiderNJ called her "legendary". Former Mayor Luis A. Quintana said of her "I see her as someone who was a pioneer as an African-American female".

== Early life ==
Mildred Joyce Coleman was born in Detroit to Edgar Coleman and Mattie Lee Johnson on November 3, 1938. She graduated from Wayne State University. She became the first African-American Braille teacher in the City of Detroit. She moved to New Jersey in 1965 and she became the first African-American Braille teacher in the state. She received her master's degree from Rutgers University–Newark in Public Administration. She was a teacher and consultant for many years with the Commission for the Blind and Visually Impaired. She was married to Cecil Crump, with whom she had two children, until his death from cancer in 1993.

== Political career ==
Crump ran for Council election as early as 1989 on a platform of fair taxation, help for tenants, and better education. She was the first Black woman to serve on the Municipal Council when she was elected in 1994. She also unsuccessfully sought election in 1990. She was elected on June 14, 1994, beating Donald Kofi Tucker in a run off election. She was the first woman to serve as council president for Newark, New Jersey, serving from 2006 to 2010 and from 2013 to 2021. She ran for Mayor in 1998, trying to call attention to crime, school failure, and corruption under Sharpe James. She served on the council for 19 total years before she resigned in 2021, as Councilman-At-Large (1994–1998, 2006–2021). She served under Mayors Sharpe James, Cory Booker, and Ras Baraka. After her resignation the Council voted to give the seat to her son Larry Crump.

She received awards such as the Susan Burgess Memorial Award for Exemplary Leadership from the National Democratic Municipal Officials. She received a Public Service Lifetime Achievement Award from the NJ chapter of the American Society for Public Administration. She was on InsiderNJ's 2021 African American Power List. She is in the New Jersey State League of Municipalities Elected Officials Hall of Fame.

== Other accomplishments ==
Crump founded Newark Women's Conference, Inc., an organization whose purpose is to promote the empowerment of women in Newark and vicinity. She also appeared on TV as host of “Straight Talk with Mildred Crump”. She was a founding member of the New Jersey Coalition of 100 Black Women, Inc., the National Political Congress for Black Women of Newark, and the Global Women's Leadership Collaborative of New Jersey. She was a past President and member of the board of trustees for Integrity House, Inc., Vice-chairperson of the Steering Committee of the Bridge to Recovery, charter member of the National Museum of African American History and Culture in Washington D.C., past chairman of the Board of Directors, Habitat for Humanity, Newark and Golden Heritage Life Member of the Newark Branch NAACP.

== Death ==
Crump died on December 1, 2024, at the age of 86. She is interred in Glendale Cemetery in Bloomfield, New Jersey.
