= List of members of the United States Congress who died in office (2000–present) =

The following is a list of United States senators and representatives who died while they were serving their terms after 2000.

== 2000s ==
Member	Party	State (district)	Date of death	Age at death (years)	Cause	Place of death	Place of burial
Paul Coverdell	Republican	Georgia (Senator)	July 18, 2000	61	Cerebral hemorrhage	Atlanta, Georgia	Arlington Memorial Park, Sandy Springs, Georgia
Herb Bateman	Republican	Virginia (1st district)	September 11, 2000	72	Unspecified natural causes	Leesburg, Virginia	Peninsula Memorial Park, Newport News, Virginia
Bruce Vento	Democratic	Minnesota (4th district)	October 10, 2000	60	Mesothelioma	Saint Paul, Minnesota	Forest Lawn Memorial Park, Ramsey County, Minnesota
Julian Dixon	Democratic	California (32nd district)	December 8, 2000	66	Heart attack	Marina del Rey, California	Inglewood Park Cemetery, Inglewood, California
Norman Sisisky	Democratic	Virginia (4th district)	March 29, 2001	73	Lung cancer	Richmond, Virginia	Beth El Cemetery, Henrico County, Virginia
Joe Moakley	Democratic	Massachusetts (9th district)	May 28, 2001	74	Myelodysplastic syndrome	Bethesda, Maryland	Blue Hill Cemetery, Braintree, Massachusetts
Floyd Spence	Republican	South Carolina (2nd district)	August 16, 2001	73	Cerebral thrombosis	Jackson, Mississippi	Saint Peters Lutheran Church Cemetery, Lexington, South Carolina
Patsy Mink	Democratic	Hawaii (2nd district)	September 28, 2002	74	Viral pneumonia following chickenpox	Honolulu, Hawaii	National Memorial Cemetery of the Pacific, Honolulu, Hawaii
Paul Wellstone	Democratic	Minnesota (Senator)	October 25, 2002	58	Plane crash	Eveleth, Minnesota	Lakewood Cemetery, Hennepin County, Minnesota
Bob Matsui	Democratic	California (5th district)	January 1, 2005	63	Myelodysplastic syndrome	Bethesda, Maryland	East Lawn Memorial Park, Sacramento, California
Charlie Norwood	Republican	Georgia (10th district)	February 13, 2007	65	Liver cancer	Augusta, Georgia	Westover Memorial Park, Augusta, Georgia
Juanita Millender-McDonald	Democratic	California (37th district)	April 22, 2007	68	Colon cancer	Carson, California	Forest Lawn Memorial Park, Cypress, California
Craig L. Thomas	Republican	Wyoming (Senator)	June 4, 2007	74	Leukemia	Bethesda, Maryland	Riverside Cemetery, Cody, Wyoming
Paul Gillmor	Republican	Ohio (5th district)	September 5, 2007	68	Fall down stairs	Arlington, Virginia	Pleasant Union Cemetery, Old Fort, Ohio
Jo Ann Davis	Republican	Virginia (1st district)	October 6, 2007	57	Breast cancer	Gloucester, Virginia	Bellamy Memorial Cemetery, Bellamy, Virginia
Julia Carson	Democratic	Indiana (7th district)	December 15, 2007	69	Lung cancer	Indianapolis, Indiana	Crown Hill Cemetery, Indianapolis, Indiana
Tom Lantos	Democratic	California (12th district)	February 11, 2008	80	Esophageal cancer	Bethesda, Maryland	Congressional Cemetery, Washington, D.C.
Stephanie Tubbs Jones	Democratic	Ohio (11th district)	August 20, 2008	58	Cerebral hemorrhage	East Cleveland, Ohio	Cremated
Ted Kennedy	Democratic	Massachusetts (Senator)	August 25, 2009	77	Brain cancer	Hyannis Port, Massachusetts	Arlington National Cemetery, Arlington County, Virginia

== 2010s ==
Member	Party	State (district)	Date of death	Age at death (years)	Cause	Place of death	Place of burial
John Murtha	Democratic	Pennsylvania (12th district)	February 8, 2010	77	Infection following gallbladder surgery	Arlington, Virginia	Grandview Cemetery, Johnstown, Pennsylvania
Robert Byrd	Democratic	West Virginia (Senator)	June 28, 2010	92	Unspecified complications following hospitalization for heat exhaustion	Falls Church, Virginia	Columbia Gardens Cemetery, Arlington, Virginia
Donald M. Payne	Democratic	New Jersey (10th district)	March 6, 2012	77	Colon cancer	Livingston, New Jersey	Glendale Cemetery, Bloomfield, New Jersey
Daniel Inouye	Democratic	Hawaii (Senator)	December 17, 2012	88	Respiratory complications during hospitalization	Bethesda, Maryland	National Memorial Cemetery of the Pacific, Honolulu, Hawaii
Frank Lautenberg	Democratic	New Jersey (Senator)	June 3, 2013	89	Viral pneumonia	New York City, New York	Arlington National Cemetery, Arlington, Virginia
Bill Young	Republican	Florida (13th district)	October 18, 2013	82	Multiple myeloma	Bethesda, Maryland	Bay Pines Cemetery, Bay Pines, Florida
Alan Nunnelee	Republican	Mississippi (1st district)	February 6, 2015	56	Brain cancer	Tupelo, Mississippi	Maxcy Cemetery, Belden, Mississippi
Mark Takai	Democratic	Hawaii (1st district)	July 20, 2016	49	Pancreatic cancer	Aiea, Hawaii	National Memorial Cemetery of the Pacific, Honolulu, Hawaii
Louise Slaughter	Democratic	New York (25th district)	March 16, 2018	88	Fall	Washington, D.C.	Cremated
John McCain	Republican	Arizona (Senator)	August 25, 2018	81	Brain cancer	Cornville, Arizona	United States Naval Academy Cemetery, Annapolis, Maryland
Walter B. Jones Jr.	Republican	North Carolina (3rd district)	February 10, 2019	76	Amyotrophic lateral sclerosis	Greenville, North Carolina	Forest Hills Cemetery, Farmville, North Carolina
Elijah Cummings	Democratic	Maryland (7th district)	October 17, 2019	68	"Complications concerning long-standing health challenges"	Baltimore, Maryland	Loudon Park Cemetery, Baltimore, Maryland

== 2020s ==
Member	Party	State (district)	Date of death	Age at death (years)	Cause	Place of death	Place of burial
John Lewis	Democratic	Georgia (5th district)	July 17, 2020	80	Pancreatic cancer	Atlanta, Georgia	South-View Cemetery, Atlanta, Georgia
Ron Wright	Republican	Texas (6th district)	February 7, 2021	67	COVID-19	Dallas, Texas	Mount Olivet Cemetery, Fort Worth, Texas
Alcee Hastings	Democratic	Florida (20th district)	April 6, 2021	84	Pancreatic cancer	Undisclosed	Cremated
Jim Hagedorn	Republican	Minnesota (1st district)	February 17, 2022	59	Kidney cancer	Rochester, Minnesota	Riverside Cemetery, Blue Earth, Minnesota
Don Young	Republican	Alaska (at-large)	March 18, 2022	88	Unspecified natural causes	SeaTac, Washington	Cremated
Jackie Walorski	Republican	Indiana (2nd district)	August 3, 2022	58	Traffic collision	Union Township, Elkhart County, Indiana	Southlawn Cemetery, South Bend, Indiana
Donald McEachin	Democratic	Virginia (4th district)	November 28, 2022	61	Colorectal cancer	Richmond, Virginia	Mount Calvary Cemetery, Richmond, Virginia
Dianne Feinstein	Democratic	California (Senator)	September 29, 2023	90	Unspecified natural causes	Washington, D.C.	Hills of Eternity Memorial Park, Colma, California
Donald Payne Jr.	Democratic	New Jersey (10th district)	April 24, 2024	65	Heart attack	Newark, New Jersey	Glendale Cemetery, Bloomfield, New Jersey
Sheila Jackson Lee	Democratic	Texas (18th district)	July 19, 2024	74	Pancreatic cancer	Houston, Texas	Houston, Texas
Bill Pascrell	Democratic	New Jersey (9th district)	August 21, 2024	87	Unspecified natural causes amid "fever symptoms"	Livingston, New Jersey	Holy Sepulchre Cemetery, Totowa, New Jersey
Sylvester Turner	Democratic	Texas (18th district)	March 5, 2025	70	Unspecified natural causes	Washington, D.C.	Paradise North Cemetery, Houston, Texas
Raúl Grijalva	Democratic	Arizona (7th district)	March 13, 2025	77	Lung cancer	Tucson, Arizona	Cremated
Gerry Connolly	Democratic	Virginia (11th district)	May 21, 2025	75	Esophageal cancer	Fairfax County, Virginia	Fairfax Memorial Funeral Home, Fairfax, Virginia
Doug LaMalfa	Republican	California (1st district)	January 6, 2026	65	Heart attack	Chico, California	Glen Oaks Memorial Park, Chico, California
David Scott	Democratic	Georgia (13th district)	April 22, 2026	80	Unspecified natural causes	Washington, D.C.	Atlanta, Georgia
Lindsey Graham	Republican	South Carolina (Senator)	July 11, 2026	71	Aortic dissection	Washington, D.C.	Mount Zion Cemetery, Central, South Carolina

== See also ==
- List of members of the United States Congress who died in office (1790–1899)
- List of members of the United States Congress who died in office (1900–1949)
- List of members of the United States Congress who died in office (1950–1999)
- List of members of the United States Congress killed or wounded in office
- List of United States representatives-elect who never took their seats
