= Glendale Cemetery, Bloomfield =

Cemetery in Essex County, New Jersey, US

Coordinates: 40.808°N 74.177°W

Glendale Cemetery is a cemetery located in Bloomfield and Belleville townships in the U.S. state of New Jersey.

== Notable burials ==
- Mule Suttles (1901-1966) Negro league baseball player who was inducted into the Baseball Hall of Fame in 2006.
- Sarah Vaughan (1924-1990), jazz singer.
- Albert L. Vreeland (1901-1975), represented New Jersey's 11th congressional district from 1939-1943.
- Yaki Kadafi (1977-1996), American rapper and a founder and member of Outlawz and Dramacydal. He was a close friend of American rapper Tupac Shakur. The two rappers considered themselves “brothers” even though they did not share any blood ties, but they grow up together. Kadafi and Tupac were best friends until their respective deaths in 1996. Kadafi was 19 years old when he died.
- Donald M. Payne (1934-2012), a US Congressman, served New Jersey's 10th District in the United States House of Representatives from 1989 until his death.
- Donald Payne Jr. (1958-2024), US Congressman, son of Donald Payne.
- Mildred C. Crump, long time member of the Municipal Council of Newark
