= Shavar Jeffries =

American lawyer

Personal details
- Born: 1974 (age 51–52) Newark, New Jersey, U.S.
- Party: Democratic
- Education: Duke University (BA); Columbia University (JD)
- Website: Official website

Shavar Jeffries is an American civil rights attorney who in January 2023 became the CEO of the KIPP Foundation, a nonprofit that trains educators and provides resources for KIPP public schools. Previously, he was the president of Democrats for Education Reform, which advocates for more charter schools, school funding and stricter teacher evaluations. A former assistant state Attorney General, he was a candidate in the 2014 election for Mayor of Newark, New Jersey, after which he became a partner at Lowenstein Sandler in August 2014.

== Background ==
Jeffries grew up in the South Ward of Newark. He lost his mother to violence and was raised by his grandmother, a public school teacher. He first attended Newark Public Schools and later received a scholarship to attend Seton Hall Preparatory School in West Orange. Jeffries obtained his bachelor's degree from Duke University in 1996. After graduating he attended Columbia Law School where he served as managing editor of the Columbia Human Rights Law Review and clerked for the NAACP Legal Defense and Education Fund. He received his Juris Doctor in 1999. Jeffries lives in the South Ward with his wife, Tenagne Girma-Jeffries, and their two children.

== Career ==
After law school, Jeffries clerked for Judge Nathaniel R. Jones of the U.S. Court of Appeals. He then worked as an associate with Wilmer Cutler & Pickering. Since 2001, Jeffries has been counsel at Gibbons P.C., a firm based at the Gateway Center in Newark.

Jeffries has been an associate professor at the Center for Social Justice at Seton Hall Law School since 2004. In 2008-2010, he took a leave of absence to serve as Assistant Attorney General and Counsel to New Jersey Attorney General Anne Milgram and led several departments, including the Juvenile Justice Commission and the Civil Rights Division.

In April 2010, Jeffries was elected to the Newark Public Schools Advisory Board. He became a partner at Lowenstein Sandler in August 2014. In September 2015 he became the president of Democrats for Education Reform, which advocates for more charter schools, school funding and stricter teacher evaluations.

== Mayoral candidacy ==
Jeffries announced his election bid on May 20, 2013. Jeffries was relatively unknown in Newark, where typically one runs first for council and then for mayor. Jeffries introduced a public safety plan in October 2013 As of January 2014, Jeffries had raised the most campaign financing of the candidates.

The election took place May 13, 2014 and Jeffries was defeated by Municipal Council of Newark Council Member Ras Baraka. Other potential candidates, Council Members Anibal Ramos, Jr. and Darrin S. Sharif, had earlier dropped out of the race.

Jeffries' eight-member council slate included incumbents East Ward Councilman Augusto Amador, North Ward Councilman Anibal Ramos, Jr. and At-large Councilman Carlos Gonzalez and candidates Brian Logan (South Ward). Kevin Waters (West Ward) and Andre Speight (Central Ward). Lynda Lloyd (At-large), and former Assemblyman Wilfredo Caraballo (At-large).

In February he received an endorsement of William D. Payne and March from Donald Payne, Jr., both of whom are part of a long-time Newark political dynasty. He was also endorsed by the Teamsters, State Senator Teresa Ruiz and Assemblywoman Eliana Pintor-Marin. Jeffries received the endorsements of Board of Chosen Freeholders President Blonnie Watson, Freeholder Vice-President Patricia Sebold and Freeholder D. Bilal Beasley. Hakeem Jeffries, the Democratic member of the U.S. House of Representatives, representing New York's 8th congressional district in Brooklyn and Queens with roots in Newark, also endorsed Jeffries. In May he received the endorsement of Eva Longoria. Jeffries was endorsed by The Star-Ledger.

Jeffries conceded the race to Baraka at the Golden Dome Athletic Center on election night.

== Scholarship ==
In 2015 Jeffries established the Donna Johnson Memorial Scholarship for young people who have lost a parent, guardian, or loved one to domestic violence or have otherwise been affected by violence against women.

== Success Academy Charter Schools ==
Shavar Jeffries resigned from the Board of Directors of the Success Academy Charter Schools in 2017. Jeffries is a critic of Education Secretary Betsy DeVos and President Donald Trump. This position was in conflict with Success Academy chief executive officer Eva Moskowitz, who had supported Hillary Clinton, but was muted in her criticism of Trump until several days after Jeffries' resignation.

The resignation of Jeffries came before Dan Loeb, Success Academy board chair and hedge fund executive, made racial remarks about State Senate Democratic leader Andrea Stewart-Cousins. These comments triggered a PR crisis in the biggest charter network of NYC. Loeb's statement was the black lawmaker "did more damage to people of color than anyone who has ever donned a hood." Moskowitz said an apology for these remarks was necessary. The complete post of Loeb ridiculed the legislator for not supporting charter schools. He lauded State Senator Jeff Klein who was always vocal in backing charter institutions. 93 percent of students enrolled as Success Academy are either Black or Latino.
