= Rob Menendez =

American lawyer and politician (born 1985)

- Official portrait, 2025

Member of the U.S. House of Representatives from New Jersey's 8th district
- Incumbent
- Assumed office January 3, 2023
- Preceded by: Albio Sires

Personal details
- Born: Robert Jacobsen Menendez Jr. July 12, 1985 (age 41) Englewood, New Jersey, U.S.
- Party: Democratic
- Spouse: Alex Banfich (m. 2017)
- Children: 2
- Relatives: Bob Menendez (father); Alicia Menendez (sister)
- Education: University of North Carolina at Chapel Hill (BA); Rutgers University–Newark (JD)
- Website: House website Campaign website
- Menendez's voice Menendez on the tenth anniversary of Obergefell v. Hodges; Recorded June 26, 2025

Robert Jacobsen Menendez Jr. (born July 12, 1985) is an American lawyer and politician serving as the U.S. representative for New Jersey's 8th congressional district since 2023. A member of the Democratic Party and son of former U.S. Senator Bob Menendez, he was a commissioner of the Port Authority of New York and New Jersey from 2021 to 2023.

== Early life ==
Menendez was born in Englewood, New Jersey, and raised in Union City, New Jersey. He is the son of Robert Menendez, a former Senator from New Jersey serving 11 years in prison after being convicted of numerous crimes while in office, and Jane Jacobsen, a public school teacher, school nurse, and guidance counselor. He is Cuban-American through his father. His paternal grandparents came to the United States in 1953, fleeing the regime of Fulgencio Batista. Menendez's mother, as described by his sister Alicia, is of German, Norwegian, and Irish ancestry.

Menendez attended Union City public schools through eighth grade and attended high school at The Hudson School, a private school in Hoboken, New Jersey, graduating in 2003, and later serving on its board of trustees. He received a Bachelor of Arts degree in political science from the University of North Carolina at Chapel Hill and a Juris Doctor from the Rutgers Law School, during which time he was president of the Student Bar Association, served as Notes and Comments Editor for Rutgers Race and the Law Review, received the Alumni Senior Prize, and was selected as a Governor's Executive Fellow at the Eagleton Institute of Politics.

== Early career ==
Menendez worked as a lawyer with Lowenstein Sandler LLP.

=== Port Authority of New York and New Jersey ===
On April 15, 2021, Menendez was nominated to be a commissioner of the Port Authority of New York and New Jersey by Governor Phil Murphy. He was unanimously confirmed by the New Jersey State Senate on June 3, 2021, and sworn in on June 4. He was the first Latino from New Jersey and the first millennial to serve as a Port Authority Commissioner. While serving on the board, Menendez chaired the Governance and Ethics Committee and was a member of the Finance Committee, which oversees the Port Authority’s multi-billion-dollar annual budget. He resigned as commissioner on January 2, 2023, the day before he joined Congress.

== United States House of Representatives ==
=== Elections ===
==== 2022 ====
As a member of the Democratic Party, Menendez announced his bid for New Jersey's 8th congressional district upon the retirement announcement of incumbent representative Albio Sires, who subsequently endorsed Menendez. His father represented the area before Sires from 1993 to 2006, when it was numbered the 13th congressional district.

Menendez was endorsed by prominent New Jersey politicians, including New Jersey Governor Phil Murphy, U.S. Senator Cory Booker, State Senator and Union City Mayor Brian Stack, State Senator and North Bergen Mayor Nicholas J. Sacco, Jersey City Mayor Steven Fulop, Newark Mayor Ras Baraka, Elizabeth Mayor J. Christian Bollwage, and others.

Menendez campaigned on addressing the needs of working- and middle-class families and the challenges associated with the rising costs of basic necessities such as housing, healthcare, education and family care. He spoke often about infrastructure investments, gun control, and reproductive choice. Menendez's campaign expressed support for organized labor and workers rights. He was endorsed by numerous labor unions during his campaign.

While running in his own race, Menendez raised and contributed $100,000 to the Democratic Congressional Campaign Committee, with the funds directed to Democratic incumbents and challengers running in battleground districts.

In the primary election, Menendez defeated two challengers, David Ocampo Grajales and Ane Roseborough-Eberhard, with 83.6% of the vote to Grajales's 11.3% and Roseborough-Eberhard's 5.1%. In the general election, Menendez defeated Republican nominee Marcos Arroyo, 73.6% to 23.4%.

==== 2024 ====
2024 Democratic primary results by precinct: Menendez: 40–50%; 50–60%; 60–70%; 70–80%; 80–90%; 90–100%; Bhalla: 40–50%; 50–60%; 60–70%; 70–80%; 80–90%; Jasey: 30–40%; Ties: 40–50%; No data

Menendez won the Democratic primary with 52.0% of the vote against challengers Ravinder Bhalla, who won 37.5% of the vote, and Kyle Jasey, who won 10.5% of the vote. He defeated Republican nominee Anthony Valdes in the general election, 59.2% to 34.6%.

==== 2026 ====
2026 Democratic primary results by precinct: Menendez: 40–50%; 50–60%; 60–70%; 70–80%; 80–90%; 90–100%; Ali: 50–60%; 60–70%; 80–90%; Ties: 40–50%; 50%

Menendez ran for re-election in 2026, defeating progressive challenger Mussab Ali in the Democratic primary with 68.9% of the vote.

=== Tenure ===
As a representative-elect, Menendez was elected by members of the Democratic freshman class to serve as the freshman representative on the Democratic Steering and Policy Committee for 2023. He was appointed to serve as a Regional Whip, a post in which he is responsible for assisting the Democratic Whip operation to track votes. Menendez is a member of the Congressional Hispanic Caucus.

In 2023, Menendez initially voted against the expulsion of George Santos, a Republican member of the House of Representatives who faced two federal indictments. Menendez cited the lack of a completion of the House Committee on Ethics' investigation as a reason for his position. He later changed his position during the December 1, 2023, vote on the matter, voting "yes" to expel Santos after the findings of the investigation had been unanimously adopted by the Committee and released on November 9. This took place at the same time in which Menendez's father, Bob Menendez, faced pressure to step down amid a federal indictment.

In his second term, Menendez won a seat on the powerful United States House Committee on Energy and Commerce after a competitive election among several Democratic House members. Menendez also earned a leadership position in the Democratic Congressional Campaign Committee as vice chair for the northeast. In that role, he helps lead the Democratic effort to retake control of the House in the 2026 campaign cycle. As part of his work with the Congressional Hispanic Caucus, Menendez serves as the vice chair of policy on CHC's leadership team and as finance co-chair for BOLD PAC, CHC's fundraising arm.

On May 9, 2025, Menendez conducted oversight at Delaney Hall, an ICE immigration detention center in Newark, New Jersey, alongside two Democratic representatives from New Jersey, LaMonica McIver and Bonnie Watson Coleman, and the mayor of Newark, Ras Baraka. Federal law provides members of Congress the right to conduct oversight visits such as that in the Newark immigration detention center incident. Menendez released a statement that day alleging that "ICE attempted to intimidate everyone involved and impede our ability to conduct oversight." McIver was charged in the aftermath of the oversight visit with assault, and her court case is still proceeding.

=== Committee assignments ===
==== Committee Assignments of the 119th Congress ====
- Committee on Energy and Commerce
  - Subcommittee on Communications and Technology
  - Subcommittee on Energy
  - Subcommittee on Environment

==== Former ====
- Transportation and Infrastructure Committee
  - Subcommittee on Highways and Transit
  - Subcommittee on Railroads, Pipelines, and Hazardous Materials
  - Subcommittee on Aviation
- Committee on Homeland Security
  - Subcommittee on Cybersecurity

=== Caucus memberships ===
- Congressional Hispanic Caucus (Vice Chair of Policy)
- Congressional Asian Pacific American Caucus
- House Pro-Choice Caucus
- Congressional Equality Caucus
- Congressional Dads' Caucus
- House Bipartisan Task Force for Combating Antisemitism
- Congressional Renters Caucus
- Future Forum Caucus
- Congressional Armenian Caucus
- Congressional Labor Caucus
- Congressional State and Local Tax (SALT) Caucus
- Congressional Caucus on Homelessness
- Gun Violence Prevention Task Force
- Congressional Ukraine Caucus
- Congressional Cybersecurity Caucus
- Congressional Mental Health Caucus
- Congressional Quiet Skies Caucus
- Congressional PORTS Caucus
- Congressional 5G and Beyond Caucus
- Congressional Hellenic Caucus

== Personal life ==
Menendez resides in Jersey City, New Jersey. He married Alex Banfich Menendez in 2017. They have two children.

== See also ==
- List of Hispanic and Latino Americans in the United States Congress
- Visit of Delaney Hall during 2026 hunger strike and protests

U.S. House of Representatives
Preceded by Albio Sires	Member of the U.S. House of Representatives from New Jersey's 8th congressional district 2023–present	Incumbent
U.S. order of precedence (ceremonial)
Preceded by Morgan McGarvey	United States representatives by seniority 335th	Succeeded by Max Miller
