= Central High School (Newark, New Jersey) =

High school in Newark, New Jersey, United States

Location
- 246 18th Avenue; Newark, Essex County, New Jersey 07108; United States; 40.7300549°N 74.193347°W

Information
- Type: Public high school
- Established: 1912
- NCES School ID: 341134002192
- Principal: Terri V. Mitchell
- Faculty: 77.5 FTEs
- Grades: 9–12
- Enrollment: 1,051 (as of 2024–25)
- Student to teacher ratio: 13.6:1
- Colors: Columbia blue and white
- Athletics conference: Super Essex Conference (general); North Jersey Super Football Conference (football)
- Team name: Blue Devils
- Website: www.nps.k12.nj.us/CTL

Central High School is a four-year comprehensive public high school serving students in ninth through twelfth grades in Newark, in Essex County, in the U.S. state of New Jersey, operating as part of the Newark Public Schools.

As of the 2024–25 school year, the school had an enrollment of 1,051 students and 77.5 classroom teachers (on an FTE basis), for a student–teacher ratio of 13.6:1. There were 732 students (69.6% of enrollment) eligible for free lunch and 51 (4.9% of students) eligible for reduced-cost lunch.

== History ==
Central High School was originally Central Commercial and Manual Training School, housed in what is now the Central King Building on the campus of the New Jersey Institute of Technology. It opened January 31, 1912.

The school provided vocational education, offering a forge and a foundry, a sewing room, a sheet-metal room and a wood shop, as well as an auditorium seating 1,500. The school manufactured tools for itself and the rest of the district.

A smaller school but without a forge, the East Side Commercial & Manual Training High School was built at the same time. The decade was an active one for the school district. In 1911, it opened a School for the Feeble Minded and a School for Blind. The city closed its last segregated school in 1909.

The school was renamed Central High School and remained at the original address until 2008. The Central King Building at New Jersey Institute of Technology was renovated to support the university and STEM counselling.

The school moved to its current location at 246 18th Avenue in Newark after its $107 million completion in 2008. The move was completed in 2010.

Ras Baraka served as principal of Central High School from 2007 to 2013 before his election as Mayor of Newark.

== Awards, recognition and rankings ==
The school was the 300th-ranked public high school in New Jersey out of 339 schools statewide in New Jersey Monthly magazine's September 2014 cover story on the state's "Top Public High Schools", using a new ranking methodology. The school had been ranked 277th in the state of 328 schools in 2012, after being ranked 274th in 2010 out of 322 schools listed. The magazine ranked the school 278th in 2008 out of 316 schools. The school was ranked 304th in the magazine's September 2006 issue, which surveyed 316 schools across the state.

== Academies ==
Central includes three academic academies: The Dental Studies Academy, Environmental Science academy, and Teen Pep. Students choose their career track once they have enrolled and began the academic year.

The Dental Studies Academy provides students the opportunity to gain entry-level certification in the dental field. Students have the opportunity to certify in NELDA (National Entry Level Dental Assistant), AMP (Anatomy, Morphology, and Physiology), ICE (Infection Control Exam), and RHS (Radiation Health Safety). Qualifying students will also participate in internships and a variety of community service events.

== Project Grad Scholarship ==
Central students are given the opportunity to earn a scholarship towards their college education, called the Project Grad Newark College Scholarship . The students and the students' parents read and sign a pledge stating that the student will meet minimum requirements. Some include; maintaining an average GPA of 2.5 or better, completing two college-bound summer institutes, graduating in four years. When the student completes these requirements, they are awarded $6,000 which is paid in installments over the span of four years to the college they plan to attend.

== Athletics ==
The Central High School Blue Devils compete in the Super Essex Conference, which is comprised of public and private high schools in Essex County and operates under the supervision of the New Jersey State Interscholastic Athletic Association (NJSIAA). Before the 2009 realignment, the school had competed in the Mountain Valley Conference, which consisted of public and private high schools covering Union County and Essex County in northern New Jersey. With 630 students in grades 10–12, the school was classified by the NJSIAA for the 2019–20 school year as Group II for most athletic competition purposes, which included schools with an enrollment of 486 to 758 students in that grade range. The football team competes in the National Red division of the North Jersey Super Football Conference, which includes 112 schools competing in 20 divisions, making it the nation's biggest football-only high school sports league. The school was classified by the NJSIAA as Group IV North for football for 2024–2026, which included schools with 893 to 1,315 students.

Athletic programs offered at the school include:

- Fall sports: Football, Cross Country, Soccer, Cheerleading and Girls Volleyball
- Winter sports: Boys Basketball, Bowling, Indoor Track, Girls Basketball and Cheerleading
- Spring sports: Baseball, Track and Field

The boys spring / outdoor track team won the state champions in 1919–1921.

The boys track team won the indoor / winter track public school state championship in 1922-1926 and in 1933. The girls team won the Group II championship in 1984.

The school's football team won the 1924 state football championship, defeating Asbury Park High School by a score of 39–0, in a game that was mandated by the New Jersey State Interscholastic Athletic Association after the two teams ended the regular season tied in the standings.

The boys' basketball team won the Group IV championship in 1947 against Union Hill High School, in both 1963 and 1964 against Hillside High School and in 2001 against Ewing High School. The team won the Group IV title in 1964 with a 40–37 victory against Union Hill. The 1964 team outscored Hillside by 12–2 in overtime to win the Group IV title by a final score of 60–50 in the championship game played in front of a crowd of 5,000 at Convention Hall in Atlantic City. The team won the 2006 North II, Group II state sectional championship with a 65–48 win over Madison High School.

The girls track team won the Group III indoor relay state championships in 1982, and in Group II in 1983 and 1989.

The girls team won the NJSIAA spring track Group II state championship in 1983 and 1984.

== Administration ==
The school's principal is Terri V. Mitchell. Her core administration team includes four vice principals.

== Notable alumni ==
- Mike Charles (born 1962), former professional football player who played nose tackle for nine seasons in the National Football League
- Joe Louis Clark (1938–2020), educator and principal, who was also an author and motivational speaker
- Patrick Cole (born 1993), professional basketball player
- Dolores Cross (born 1938), educator and university administrator
- Al DeRogatis (1927–1995), football player who later became a television and radio sportscaster
- Walter Devlin (1931–1995), former NBA basketball player
- Kenneth A. Gibson (1932–2019), politician who served as Mayor of Newark from 1970 to 1986
- DeMingo Graham (born 1973), NFL athlete who has played for the Houston Texans
- Larry Hazzard (born 1944), former amateur boxer, boxing referee, athletic control board commissioner, teacher and actor
- Mohamed Kamara (born 2000), American football outside linebacker who has played in the NFL for the Tampa Bay Buccaneers
- Anthony Mann (1906–1967), actor and film director, most notably of film noir and Westerns
- Alexander Matturri (1913–1992), politician and jurist who served in the New Jersey State Senate from 1968 to 1972
- Sherman Maxwell (1907–2008), sportscaster and chronicler of Negro league baseball who has been described as the first African American sports broadcaster in history
- LaMonica McIver (born 1985/1986), politician who is a member-elect from New Jersey's 10th congressional district
- Hymen B. Mintz (1909–1986), politician who served in the New Jersey General Assembly from 1954 to 1957
- Kyle Moore-Brown (born 1971, class of 1989), former Arena Football League offensive lineman/defensive lineman for the Albany/Indiana Firebirds and the Colorado Crush
- Ronald Owens (1930–2005), politician who served in the New Jersey General Assembly from 1966 to 1978
- Dore Schary (1905–1980), motion picture director, writer, and producer, and playwright who became head of production at Metro-Goldwyn Mayer and eventually president of the studio
- Joseph Wrzos (1929–2023), science fiction writer and editor
