= Central King Building =

Coordinates: 40°44′32″N 74°10′40″W

The Central King Building at the New Jersey Institute of Technology (NJIT) was originally built as the Central Commercial and Manual Training School. It housed a co-ed college/vocational preparatory school which provided students with "a happier and more healthful environment than their own homes". It was constructed under the supervision of the Newark School Board's Head of Construction Department, Ernest F. Gilbert. It housed Central High School until its purchase in 2010 by NJIT. Built in the Collegiate Gothic style, it was renovated under a New Jersey state grant and reopened as a university building and STEM counseling center on April 13, 2017.

== History ==
Plans for construction of the proposed Central Commercial and Manual Training School House were publicly announced on March 14, 1909. A competition of architects had been conducted by the board of the Newark Public Schools three years preceding the announcement in order to determine the most elegant design. However, the plans drawn up by the winner, a Mr. Myers, had called for the costly excavation into a ledge of rock, estimated to cost $40,000. Although the Board had already set aside a total budget of approximately $650,000 for the construction of the school building, the board was not in favor of the expenditure. Luckily, the School Board's supervising Architect, Ernest F. Gilbert, worked out a solution to the problem which rendered the excavation unnecessary and continued to maintain the level of elegance desired by the School Board. Throughout construction Gilbert remained in charge of planning and supervising, assisted by George W. Knight, the school engineer in charge of heating, lighting, ventilating and other engineering details. An additional floor was called for the week following the announcement in 1909, and Gilbert was able to accommodate the change without damaging the architectural structure. Although the school was founded in 1911, the building itself was not dedicated until January 31, 1912, upon which the city of Newark was congratulated, and by 1913 evening classes had begun.

Mr. Gilbert's solution had included the design of a dramatic staircase which sat at the front of the school and took advantage of the slope upon which the school was built. However, around the year 1970 Ernest F. Gilbert's staircase was demolished in favor of the construction of an indoor swimming pool in its place. After the 1967 Newark riots, the school's area fell into decline. This promoted the expansion of the four bordering universities which include the Rutgers University–Newark campus, NJIT, Essex County College, the University of Medicine And Dentistry of New Jersey (now the New Jersey Medical School of Rutgers). Having been engulfed by its campus, NJIT officially purchased it in 2010. After this purchase NJIT began using the building for adult courses, although some high school classes continued on certain floors until the complete migration of the high school's student populace to their new school building.

== Structure ==
The Central King Building was originally built in a Jacobean style, although the towers on each corner are Tudor Gothic. Its initial shape was a large square-like building consisting of a combination of terracotta and brick, three stories high, with each corner tower an extra story higher. This building's initial accommodation was 1,200 students.

The Central King Building was initially created with the goal to accommodate all STEM students. The first floor contained a machine shop, reference library, administrative offices, pattern shop, a metalworking shop, three classrooms, and spaces for wood-turning, masonry, and wood-finishing. The second floor contained five standard classrooms, three for business and typewriting, two for chemical labs, separated by a lecture room, two sewing rooms, two millinery rooms, and a room for dressmaking and a large study hall. The third floor contains EIGHT standard classrooms, a music room, a biological lab, a laundry room, two kitchens, a great-machine drawing room, a free-hand drawing room, two physics labs and a lecture room. The fourth room was left unfinished, leaving room to accommodate more students. The basement includes spaces for lockers, foundry and forge rooms, stock rooms and space for heating and ventilation. Outside of the building, there is a portion of land that contains a boiler and engine rooms, as well as a mechanical testing plant.

== Renovations ==
The Central King Building is currently undergoing a series of renovations. Funded by a $750 million New Jersey grant (Part of the higher education bond act), this project's construction costs are estimated at $85 million. Torcon Inc. is the construction manager for the renovations, and they seek to “restore CKB as an important architectural feature of Newark’s historic Martin Luther King Jr. Blvd,” while preserving its collegiate gothic exterior. With the ongoing renovations, NJIT plans to transform the Central King Building into a modern STEM teaching and learning center, in hopes to meet the institution's goals, in terms of enrollment, education, research, and graduation.

=== Center for Innovation and Discovery ===
A collection of laboratories, as well as design and modeling studios. An existing auditorium will be refurbished to host lectures, presentations, and share ideas. The repurposing of a gym and the swimming pool will also be done in favor of academic spaces. Being accessible to both students and visitors, the Center for Innovation and Discovery is being built with the intention to “cross-pollinate” ideas.

=== Biological Sciences Education and Research Center ===
Here, a collaboration of students and researchers in the fields of biology, biomedical engineering, pharmaceutical chemistry, biochemistry, biophysics, and mathematical biology will take place, to integrate and innovate within the fields of biological sciences and engineering.

=== Teaching and Learning Centers ===
This will include a Teaching Effectiveness Institute, as well as centers for Math Engagement and Composition.
