= 2018 Newark mayoral election =

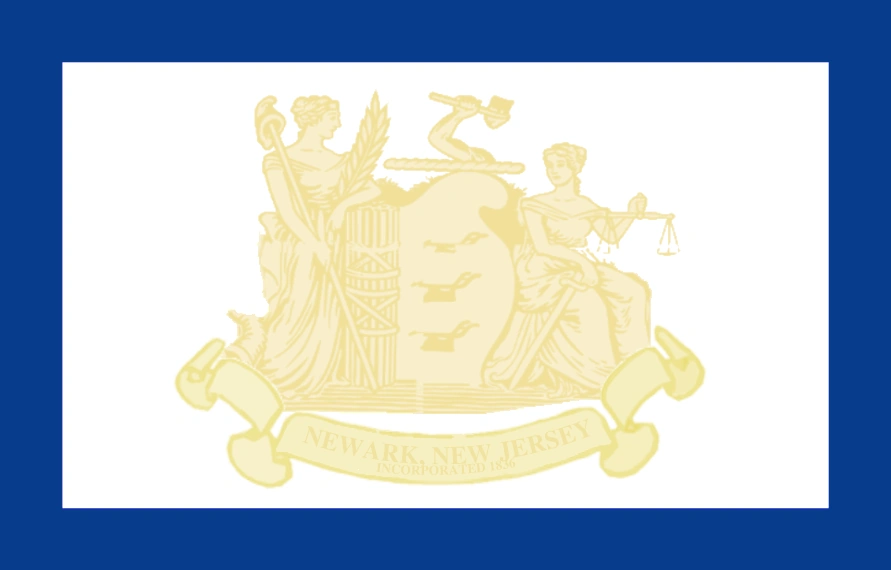
- May 8, 2018
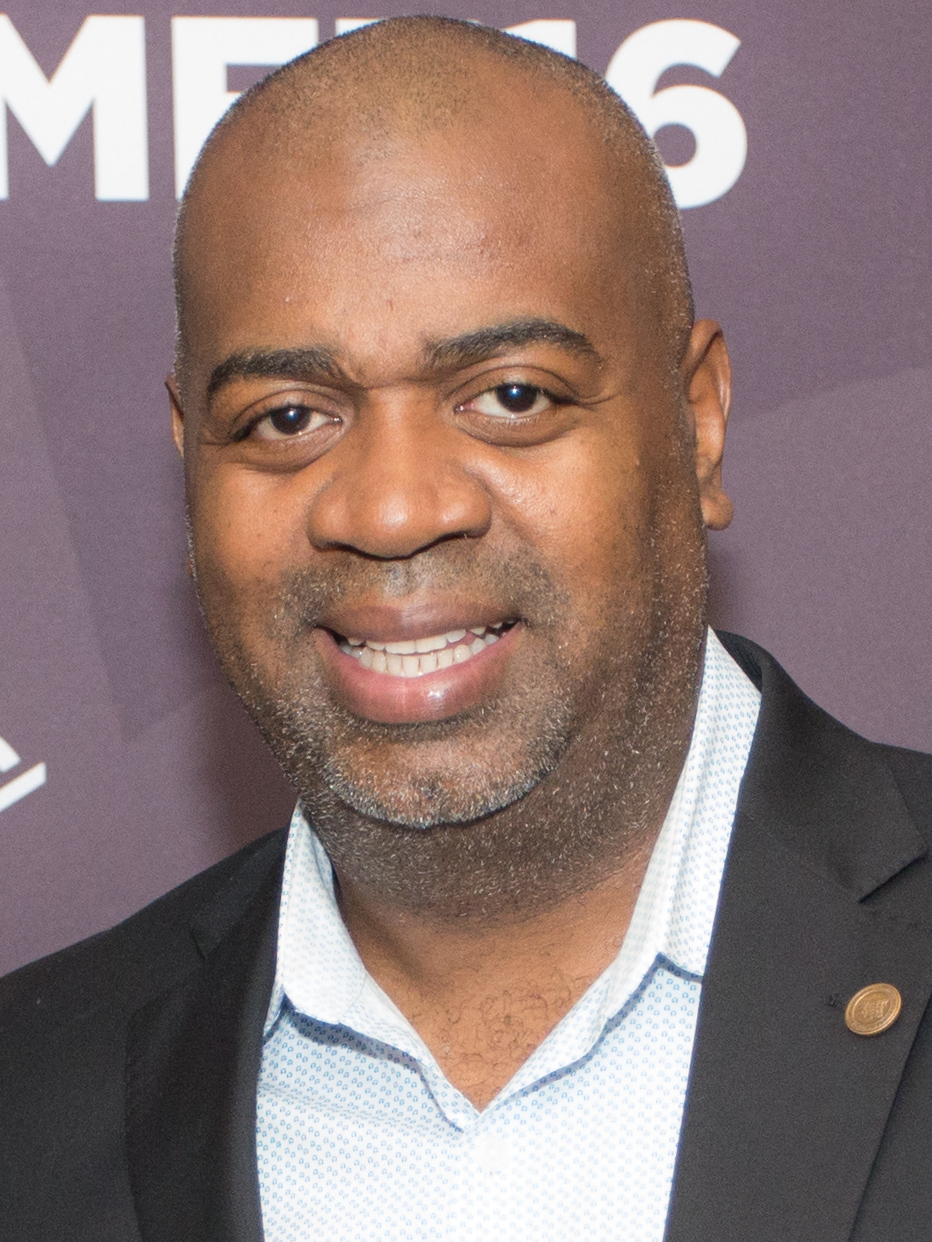

Candidate	Ras Baraka	Gayle Chaneyfield Jenkins
Popular vote	22,094	6,510
Percentage	77.00%	22.69%
Mayor before election
Ras Baraka
Democratic
Elected mayor
Ras Baraka
Democratic

The 2018 election for mayor of Newark took place in Newark, the most populous city in New Jersey, United States, on May 8, 2018. Elections for all seats on the nine-member Municipal Council of Newark were held the same day. A runoff election, if necessary, would have taken place on June 5, 2018. Elections are non-partisan and candidates are not listed by political party. Incumbent Mayor Ras Baraka avoided a runoff after winning a second term with 77 percent of the votes.

== Candidates ==
The deadline for candidates to file for election was March 5, 2018, by which time each potential candidate must have submitted a petition signed by at least 1,413 voters. As of Monday January 8, 2018, six people had requested petitions necessary to mount a mayoral campaign:

- Abdush Shahid Ahmad
- Ras Baraka, incumbent mayor
- Darnella A. Lee
- Sheila A. Montague

By election day, however, Newark councilwoman Gayle Chaneyfield Jenkins, who had entered the race on January 9, 2018, was Mayor Baraka's only challenger.

== Results ==
Results
Candidate	Votes	%
Ras Baraka (incumbent)	22,094	77.0
Gayle Chaneyfield Jenkins	6,510	22.7
Write-in	90	0.3
Total votes	28,694	100%

== See also ==
- 2014 Newark mayoral election
