= Lowenstein Sandler =

American law firm

Lowenstein Sandler LLP
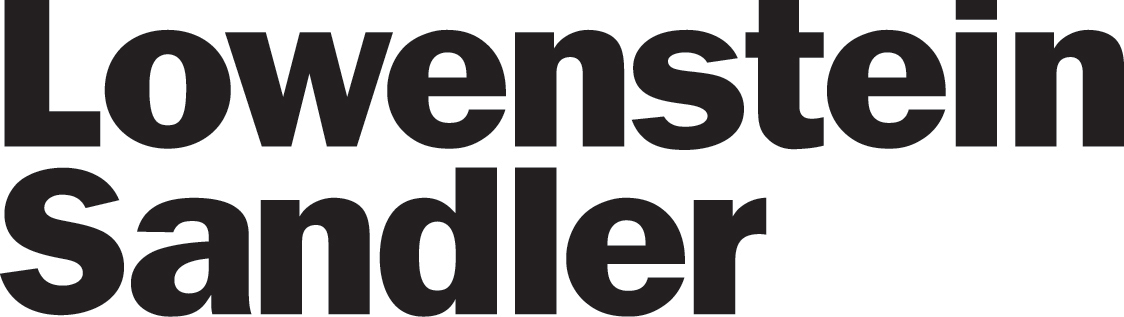
- Headquarters: New York, New York; Roseland, New Jersey
- No. of offices: 7
- No. of attorneys: 400+
- Key people: Gary M. Wingens, Chair, Jonathan C. Wishnia, Managing Partner
- Revenue: US$523 million (2024)
- Date founded: 1961; 65 years ago
- Company type: Limited liability partnership
- Website: www.lowenstein.com

Lowenstein Sandler is a national law firm with over 400 lawyers based in New York, Palo Alto, Roseland, Salt Lake City, San Francisco, Washington, D.C., and Wilmington.

== History ==
The firm was founded in 1961 and was based in Newark, New Jersey. Two of the firm's founders were Newark-born Alan V. Lowenstein who was also a leader of Newark's charter reform movement, and Richard Sandler, for whom the firm is also named. In the early 1980s, it had 67 lawyers and a staff of 150, but moved to Roseland, New Jersey, after a four-year decision-making process.

In 1994, firm attorney Faith Hochberg became the United States Attorney for the District of New Jersey. In 2003, the firm promoted African-American David L. Harris, a one-time "radical", to head its litigation department. In 2004, the firm represented creditors in the reorganization of Interstate Bakeries, the maker of Wonder bread, Twinkies, Devil Dogs; this case was considered to be one of the largest bankruptcy proceedings in the country.

The firm handles legal work relating to real estate auctions and decisions about whether a business should go public. On one occasion, attorneys tabulated stockholder votes

In 2008, the firm opened an office in Silicon Valley, California, to expand its law practice in venture capital and technology. In 2009, the firm had offices in New York City and Palo Alto, California, while maintaining its office in Roseland, New Jersey. In 2014, the firm opened its Washington, D.C., office. In 2017, Lowenstein moved its Roseland office to new facilities.

In 2018, the firm conducted an internal investigation of the Dallas Mavericks and uncovered "numerous instances of sexual harassment and other improper workplace conduct within the Mavericks organization" over the preceding two decades.

== Recognitions ==
In 2019, the National Law Journal ranked Lowenstein 145th in the United States based on size. The firm placed 103rd on The American Lawyer's 2022 Am Law 200 ranking. On the 2021 Global 200 survey, Lowenstein Sandler ranked as the 144th highest grossing law firm in the world.

== Staff ==
38 of the firm's lawyers (across 11 practice areas) are listed in "Chambers USA: America's Leading Lawyers for Business."

== Controversies ==
- In 1988, a judge ordered one Lowenstein attorney to step in to replace an ill lawyer for a reputed organized-crime leader, since Lowenstein had been involved in pre-trial work on the case. The lawyer defied the order, claiming that he couldn't do it because it would require reading a 27,000-page transcript, litigating without having established a relationship with the jury, and having to interrupt his work with five other clients. Attorney Matthew P. Boylan told the judge "I refuse" and this statement resulted in a contempt of court charge, including fines, and a running battle covered in newspapers. The contempt charge was upheld through appeals, and the firm ended up paying the fines.
- In 2010, Judge Ellen Koblitz of the New Jersey Superior Court found that the firm, along with co-counsel Paul, Weiss, Rifkind, Wharton & Garrison, had filed and prosecuted frivolous litigation involving Ronald Perelman's in-laws and ordered the firms to pay $1.96 million in attorneys' fees to the defendants. However, on appeal, this decision was overturned and the sanctions order reversed.

== Notable lawyers and alumni ==
- Matthew Boxer, former New Jersey State Comptroller
- Zulima Farber, former New Jersey Attorney General (2006)
- Faith Hochberg, former United States District Judge for the District of New Jersey (1999–2015)
- Elie Honig, former assistant United States attorney
- Shavar Jeffries, Newark politician
- Kei Komuro, associate, husband of former Japanese princess Mako Komuro
- Paul Matey, judge, U.S. Court of Appeals for the Third Circuit
- Rob Menendez, member of the United States Congress, son of Senator Bob Menendez
- Lewis J. Paper, author
- Matthew Platkin, former New Jersey Attorney General
- Christopher Porrino, former New Jersey Attorney General (2016–2018)
- Ted Wells, criminal defense lawyer
- Freda L. Wolfson, former Chief Judge of the United States District Court for the District of New Jersey
