= Shavar McIntosh =

American actor

- Born: November 13, 1997 (age 28)
- Occupation: Stage actor

Shavar McIntosh (born November 13, 1997) is a young actor.

He made his Broadway debut in The Lion King as Simba, a role he is currently portraying. He is from Harlem, New York City.
