= Ras Baraka =

American politician and educator (born 1970)

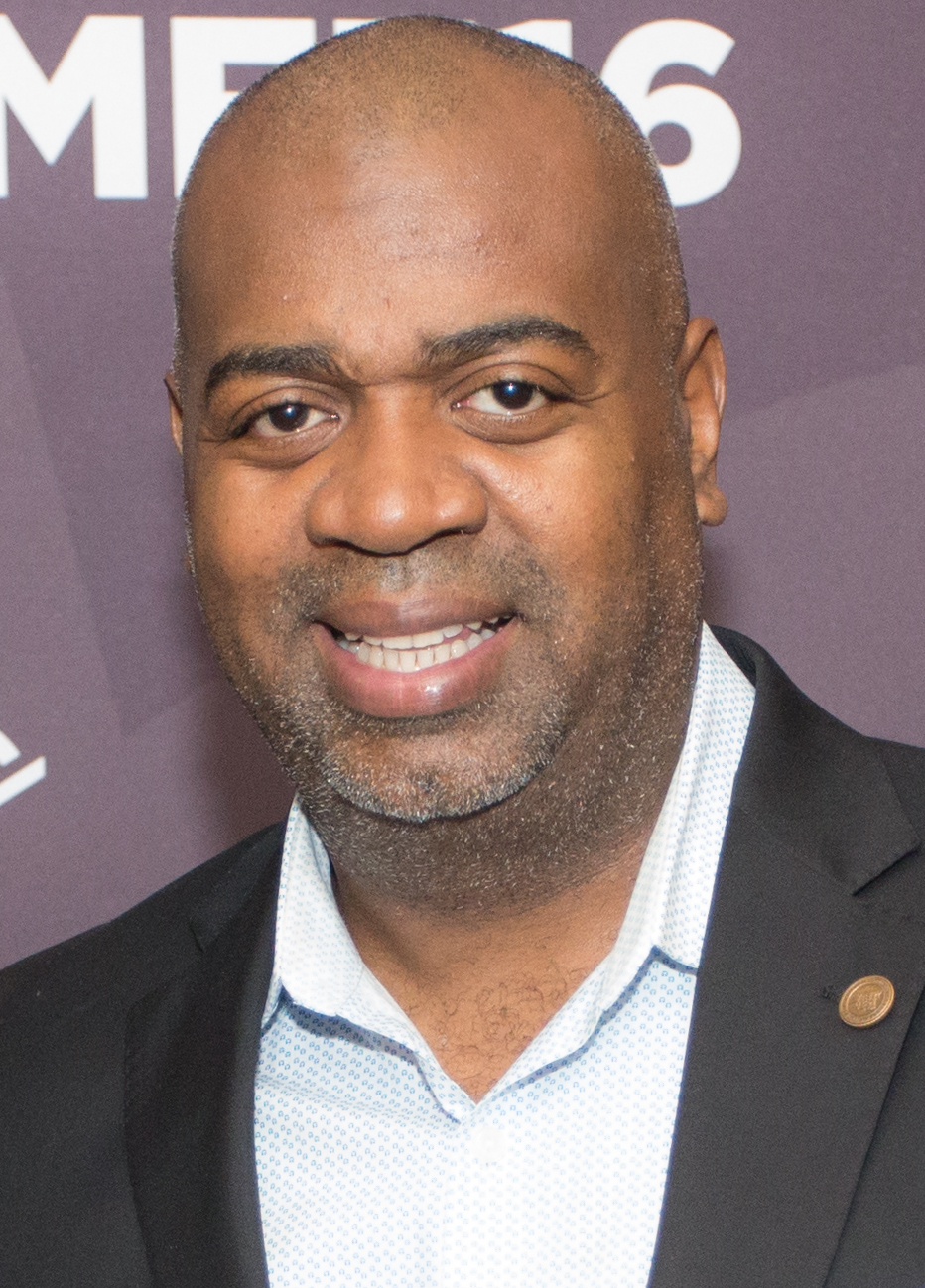
- Baraka in 2016

40th Mayor of Newark
- Incumbent
- Assumed office July 1, 2014
- Preceded by: Luis A. Quintana

Member of the Newark Municipal Council from the South Ward
- In office July 1, 2010 – July 1, 2014
- Preceded by: Oscar James
- Succeeded by: John James

Member of the Newark Municipal Council from the at-large district
- In office November 2, 2005 – July 1, 2006
- Preceded by: Donald Kofi Tucker
- Succeeded by: Mildred Crump

Personal details
- Born: Ras Jua Baraka; April 9, 1970 (age 56) Newark, New Jersey, U.S.
- Party: Democratic
- Spouse: Linda Jumah (m. 2019)
- Relations: Amiri Baraka (father); Amina Baraka (mother)
- Children: 4
- Education: Howard University (BA); Saint Peter's University (MA)
- Website: Official website

Ras Jua Baraka (born April 9, 1970) is an American politician, author, and educator. A member of the Democratic Party, Baraka is the 40th and current mayor of Newark, New Jersey. First elected in the 2014 election, he was sworn into office on July 1, 2014, and was reelected in 2018, 2022 and 2026.

Prior to his election as mayor, he served on the Municipal Council of Newark and as principal of the city's Central High School. Baraka sought the Democratic nomination for governor of New Jersey in the 2025 election, but lost in the primary to Mikie Sherrill.

== Early life and education ==
A Newark native, Baraka is the son of poet and activist Amiri Baraka (born Everett Leroy Jones), and poet and actress Amina Baraka (born Sylvia Robinson).

Baraka was educated in the Newark Public Schools, attending University High School. He earned a Bachelor of Arts degree in political science from Howard University in Washington, DC; and a Master of Arts degree in education supervision from Saint Peter's University in Jersey City, New Jersey.

== Career in education ==
Baraka was the principal of Central High School from 2007 until 2013. Before he was principal, he was a school teacher.

== Poetry, spoken word, and hip-hop ==
Baraka edited the 1992 book In the Tradition: An Anthology of Young Black Writers.

Baraka was featured on singer Lauryn Hill's 1998 The Miseducation of Lauryn Hill, as the narrator of several interludes on the album. He also recorded the intro to The Score, the Fugees' second album. Baraka and Hill recorded an unreleased single together titled "Hot Beverage in the Winter", which later featured on his spoken-word album Shorty for Mayor.

Baraka dedicated his collection of poems Black Girls Learn Love Hard to the life of his late sister, Shani Baraka, who had been fatally shot in 2003. He had read as part of the city's Dodge Poetry Festival.

Baraka has participated in the National Political Hip-Hop Convention. In 2019, Baraka released the spoken word video What We Want.

In 2025, an audio recording of Baraka's poem American Poem, which he performed on Def Poetry Jam on HBO in 2003, was featured in singer Beyonce's Cowboy Carter tour.

== Early political career ==
Between 2002 and 2006 Baraka was Newark Municipal Council member and in 2002 was appointed deputy mayor, and served that position until 2005. In November 2005, Baraka was voted to complete the term vacated by the deceased Councilmember-at-Large Donald Kofi Tucker.

In May 2010 he defeated then-councilman Oscar James II in a highly contested election, on a platform critical of Mayor Cory Booker. The election was documented on the Sundance TV reality television series Brick City, which stars Booker, Baraka and other Newark political and residential figures.

== Mayor of Newark ==
=== Elections ===
Baraka ran his first campaign for mayor when he was 24 years old, in 1994.

Baraka ran in the 2014 Newark mayoral election against former Assistant State Attorney General Shavar Jeffries, after fellow council members Anibal Ramos, Jr. and Darrin Sharif dropped out of the race. In August 2013, fellow council members Mildred C. Crump and Ronald C. Rice issued statements formally backing Baraka's candidacy. Baraka's slate for the municipal council included John Sharpe James (council member-at-large running for South Ward), Mildred C. Crump (council member at-large incumbent), Alturrick Kenney (at-large candidate), Patrick Council (at-large candidate) and Joe McCallum (West Ward candidate).

In December 2013, the Communications Workers of America endorsed Baraka. In February 2014 he received the endorsement of former New Jersey governor Richard Codey and Jersey City mayor Steven Fulop. In March he was endorsed by 1199SEIU United Healthcare Workers East.

On May 13, 2014, Baraka was elected mayor of Newark. Official results show that of 44,951 ballots cast, he received 24,358 to Jeffries' 20,593. He succeeded Luis A. Quintana, who was completing the term of Cory Booker, who had resigned after being elected to the United States Senate in October 2013. Baraka was sworn in as the city's 40th mayor by former governor of New Jersey Richard Codey at ceremonies at the New Jersey Performing Arts Center on July 1, 2014, for a four-year term.

Baraka was re-elected in 2018 and 2022.

=== Transition ===
Soon after winning the 2014 election, Baraka initiated meetings with Cory Booker on May 19 with Governor Chris Christie, and Essex County executive Joseph N. DiVincenzo Jr. on May 21.

On May 28, 2014, Baraka announced his transition team, headed by former mayor Kenneth Gibson.

Baraka appointed his brother, Amiri "Middy" Baraka, Jr. as his chief of staff.

=== Tenure ===
Politico has described Baraka as "one of the most progressive Democrats in New Jersey, and possibly the nation".

During his tenure as mayor, Baraka has earned praise for improving Newark's economic prospects.

==== Newark schools ====
The Newark Public Schools system (serving approximately 40,000 students) was placed under state control in 1994. Newark is one of 31 Abbott districts. The state is required to cover all costs for school building and renovation projects in these districts under the supervision of the New Jersey Schools Development Authority.

In 2010, Mark Zuckerberg, the founder of Facebook, donated $100 million of his personal fortune through his foundation StartUp Education to the Newark school system. Release of the funds required matching funds, which were mostly raised through the Foundation for Newark's Future and have largely been spent, though funds remain.

Teams of consultants have suggested numerous management reforms from the top down, but according to Baraka, echoing concerns of many residents, they have ignored the community and the needs of children and wishes of families in the neighborhoods. A restructuring program called One Newark calls for the closure of some public schools and the opening of more charter schools (some in public school buildings).

The reorganization, spearheaded by state-appointed superintendent Cami Anderson, would relocate, consolidate or close one quarter of the district's schools that she has determined are underutilized. The plan has met with stiff resistance from large segments of Newark's population, with critics saying there was no evidence it will increase student performance. The plan would also include teacher lay-offs. While there is some agreement with many of the policies being implemented in the program, the disregard for community input and the pace of change has drawn criticism. The plan will require some students to leave their neighborhoods and travel across the city, with many parents fearing for their safety.

Baraka ran for election with a campaign to take back local control of the schools. In May 2014, Newark, which already had control of operations (includes student transportation and other support services), was granted local powers over budget and finance, giving the local advisory board its first formal vote on the district's nearly $1 billion in annual spending. The state retains the right to veto any action of the local board and has the final say in appointing the superintendent of the district. Baraka, as an outspoken advocate of returning control of Newark's schools to local authority, has called for the ouster of state-appointed Superintendent Anderson. Anderson's contract was renewed in June 2014.

A discrimination complaint filed on behalf of Newark parents and the Newark branch of New Jersey's Parents Unified for Local School Education (PULSE) claims that 86 percent of the students affected by "One Newark" changes are African American, while African-American students make up 51 percent of the entire district. The allegation is being investigated by the United States Department of Education's Office of Civil Rights.

Baraka has called for the resignation of Cami Anderson, the state-appointed superintendent. Anderson resigned in June 2015. While Anderson's resignation made the situation less politically volatile, Baraka opposes the creation of more charter schools, and believes they come at the expense of public schools.

==== Crime and gang violence ====
In October 2013 Baraka introduced his program to deal with crime and gang violence in the city, the Ras Baraka Blueprint to Reduce Crime and Violence in Newark. It includes "Project Chill", which incorporates elements similar to Boston's Operation Ceasefire and other engagement with gang members and intervention programs. As of June 30 there had been 43 homicides in 2014. In 2013 through June 30, the city recorded 41 homicides. A surge of violence in the second half of 2013 pushed the homicide total to 111, the most since 1990. In 2019 and 2020 the city had 51 homicides.

In Fall 2014, Baraka started the Model Neighborhood initiative, which increased police presence in troubled neighborhoods.

In 2020, Baraka created the Office of Violence Prevention & Trauma Recovery to steer resources to the root causes of violence, while ensuring that the many organizations contributing to public safety are working in alignment. The city has now achieved a historic 60-year low in violence.

==== Underwater mortgages and eminent domain ====
Between 2008 and mid-2013, 6,810 homes were foreclosed in Newark, and citywide, and homeowners in the city and lost roughly $1.8 billion in home values. At that time about 9,000 Newark residents were "underwater", where payment balances are higher than the fair market value of the property. In May 2014, Baraka introduced a resolution adopted by the municipal council that would affect an estimated one thousand Newark homeowners threatened with foreclosure, giving the city legal authority to purchase home with underwater mortgages through eminent domain and refinancing them. it is estimated that more than 50% of Newark homes are financed by underwater mortgages, partially as a result of the 2010 United States foreclosure crisis.

==== Newark Watershed ====
The Newark Watershed comprises 35,000 acres of reservoirs and water treatment and supply systems for more than 500,000 customers in northern New Jersey including Newark and neighboring Belleville, Elizabeth, Bloomfield and Nutley. It is considered one of the city's greatest assets. A New Jersey State Comptroller report issued in February 2014 revealed irregularities and corruption within the Newark Watershed and Development Corporation, which is the process of being dismantled after being taken over by the city. In March 2014, Baraka called for a forensic audit of the agency. Despite protestations from the city council, in April 2014 a Superior Court judge ruled that the city must continue to fund the agency during the process.

In 2016 Newark officials were informed that the chemical, sodium silicate, that they added twenty years ago to prevent corrosion and the leaching of lead from service line pipes into the water had stopped working. Based on public records, in 2015, the city had increased the acidity of the water to lower possible carcinogens in the supply. As a result, the acidity lessened the benefit of the sodium silicate. Water testing by the city showed elevated levels of lead at roughly half of the schools in Newark. City and state officials blamed poor internal plumbing and maintenance as the cause. In July 2017, Newark's water showed elevated levels of lead and Baraka later stated that extensive testing had begun as required by state law but claimed the city did not know how widespread the issue was so there was no need to take further action.

In January 2018, results from a second consecutive test showed continued elevated levels of lead from Newark. Baraka continued to dismiss the warnings and had the city tell residents that the lead issue was only in older homes in the city's annual water quality mailing. Comparisons to the Flint water crisis were rejected by Baraka and called those comparisons "absolutely and outrageously false statements" via a message on the city's website that was later deleted. In December 2018, in order to combat the negative publicity of the lead contamination, Newark hired Mercury Public Affairs, the same public relations firms that the former Governor of Michigan, Rick Snyder, hired during the water crisis in Flint, for $225,000.00. Baraka later called the allegations that he deliberately misled residents "BS" stating "we weren't saying that the water coming out of your tap was safe ... it said the source water is fine. After that, we explained what the problem is. It's misleading to tell people that the water is contaminated."

In 2019, the Baraka administration began a massive effort to replace lead water pipes that were causing lead in drinking water to exceed federal limits. By spring of 2021, local officials had removed more than 20,000 lead service lines.

In 2022, Vice President Kamala Harris called Newark “the national model” for lead line replacement. The replacement of over 23,000 lines in the city, which was estimated to take eight years, was completed in just under three years.

In February 2024, officials announced that they found three properties with faulty service line replacements by a then un-named third party. The city had those lines replaced same day. In October 2024, it was announced that the company hired to replace a portion of the city's lead service lines, JAS Group Enterprise, Inc., lied and never performed the replacement work at 1,500 sites. Those sites were later replaced with the proper materials.

==== Budget deficit and state oversight ====
In August 2014, citing a $30 million deficit in the city's 2013 budget and an anticipated $60 million deficit for 2014, Baraka said that Newark would likely have to ask for emergency aid from the state, which, if received, would require state oversight and involvement in the city's financial affairs. As of September 2014, the state's Local Finance Board, overseen by the New Jersey Department of Community Affairs, had not taken action. That same month, the city auctioned properties, most of which had been foreclosed, in an attempt to raise funds. The state's Department of Community Affairs awarded Newark $10 million in transitional aid, which comes with a required oversight memorandum of understanding. The state will hire a private firm to oversee the city's financial management and compliance. The state will reduce budgets for the city clerk and expenses for council members as part of the agreement.

==== Housing ====
In 2014, Baraka initiated a program, called Model Neighborhoods, intended to take a comprehensive approach to addressing the factors causing troubled neighborhoods.

In 2014, the city initiated a Valentine's Day building lot sale in which married couples could purchase housing plots in the city for $1,000, provided they built a house on the lot within 18 months. Nearly 100 plots were sold; as of 2015, few had been built on, due to insufficient financing.

==== Campaign financing violations ====
In November 2017, Baraka and his campaign treasurer were issued a 28-count complaint by the New Jersey Election Law Enforcement Commission, alleging they violated campaign finance rules in the 2014 mayoral election, mainly for failure to fully disclose the source of $396,000 in campaign donations in the expensive and tightly contested campaign.

==== Kailaasa scam ====
In March 2023, Baraka invited supposed representatives of Kailaasa, a self-proclaimed micronation, to Newark's City Hall to enter a "cultural trade agreement" and become sister cities. Kailasa is a self-proclaimed island micronation (in its own words, a "Revival of the Ancient Enlightened Hindu Civilizational Nation") off the coast of Ecuador. The island had been purchased by Swami Nithyananda, a self-proclaimed "godman" and ashram founder often referred to as a scam artist. NBC reported that Baraka, along with the municipal council, was duped by Nithyananda and his "fake country".

City officials, including Baraka, took photos and signed documents to make Newark a "sister city" with Kailaasa. Baraka was not aware of the scam until after an official ceremony had been held. Newark City Hall called the scam a "regrettable incident," a council member referred to it as an "oversight," and Newark residents expressed embarrassment that city officials did not bother to perform a basic Google search to determine whether "Kailasa" was a real country or city.

==== Delaney Hall ICE arrest ====
Baraka has opposed the reopening of the U.S. Immigration and Customs Enforcement (ICE) detention facility at Delaney Hall in Newark, having the city litigate against its opening. Baraka said the facility had not opened with proper permits and that city inspectors had not been allowed to enter. ICE officials denied these claims.

On May 9, 2025, Baraka was arrested by (ICE) agents outside of the Delaney Hall ICE facility. Interim U.S. attorney Alina Habba said Baraka was arrested because he "committed trespass and ignored multiple warnings from Homeland Security Investigations to remove himself from the ICE detention center". Baraka attempted to join a congressional delegation conducting oversight, was denied entry by a federal official, and then Baraka exited the secure area of the facility and returned to stand on public property; however, minutes later, federal agents surrounded Baraka, handcuffed him, and brought him inside the facility.

In a press conference after the arrest, Democratic House representative Rob Menendez said ICE agents "feel no restraint on what they should be doing, and that was shown in broad daylight today". Baraka had an initial court appearance, was charged with trespassing and was later released on the same day of his arrest. After release, he told waiting supporters, "The reality is this: I didn't do anything wrong." Baraka voiced support for the people and immigrants in his community. He did not speak about his case, saying he made a promise to the judge and lawyers.

Baraka has said since his arrest that he will continue to oppose the Delaney Hall ICE facility, both in court and through protests. On May 19, 2025, Habba announced that the charges were dropped and invited him to tour the facility with her.

==== Delaney Hall hunger strike and protests ====
External May 31 live stream
- https://www.youtube.com/live/dhCEpoxWx-M?si=HGH00hjmeSyLnOT4

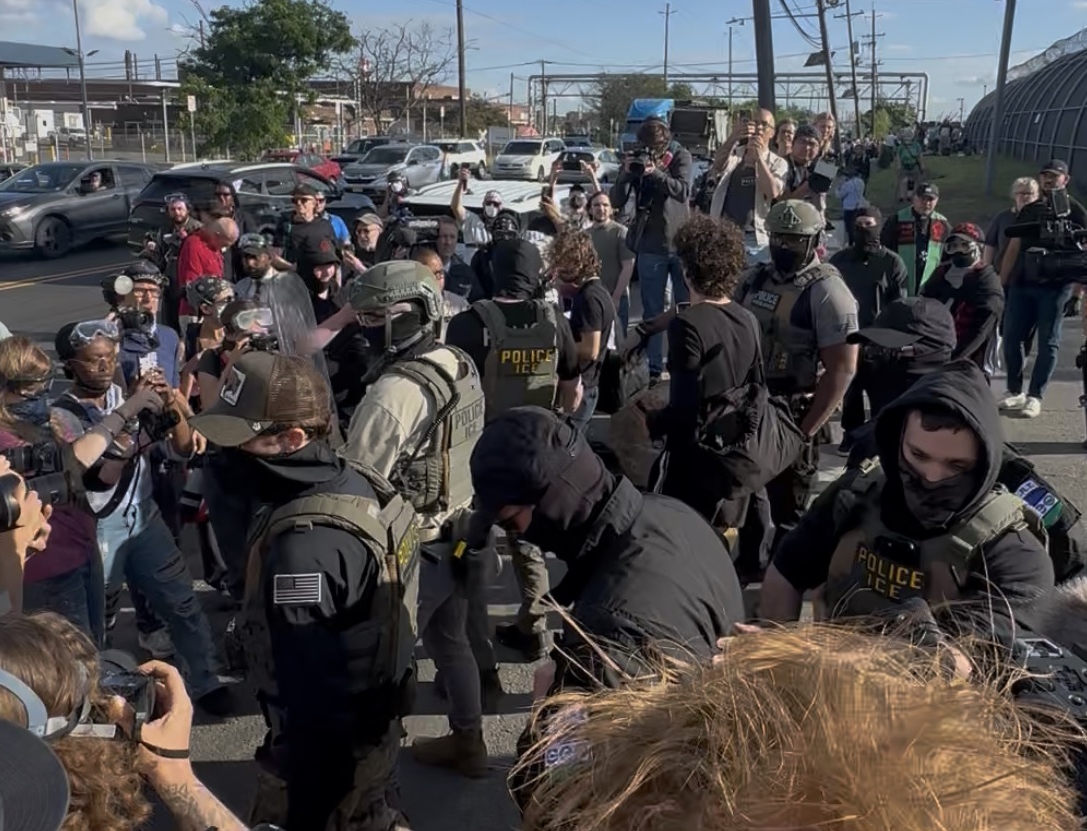
By row:
- Banner drop outside the facility, and detainees wave at protesters from inside
- ICE agents clash with protesters outside the facility

On May 22, 2026, in Newark, New Jersey, immigrants detained in Delaney Hall, a private prison run by GEO Group used for holding immigrants detained by Immigration and Customs Enforcement (ICE), held a month-long hunger and labor strike protesting conditions inside the facility. Detainees were allegedly given expired food with worms or mold, sleep on the floor in overcrowded rooms, have been denied medical care for serious conditions, and have reportedly been abused by guards. Protests and civil unrest outside the facility in support of the strikers quickly escalated, resulting in over 90 arrests. Conditions inside the facility worsened, with reports of batons, pepper spray, and tear gas being used against strikers and multiple ambulances arriving at the facility throughout the strike. The strikes ended due to actions taken by guards to intimidate, segregate, and discipline strikers, such as by putting strike leaders in solitary confinement, threatening to force-feed strikers, and transporting strikers to unknown facilities around the country.

Some black bloc protesters blocked ICE vehicles from entering or exiting the facility. ICE agents attacked protesters and journalists with batons, pepper spray, and tasers, in many cases singling out and detaining protesters or pushing protesters into oncoming traffic. Local officials including Governor Mikie Sherrill (D) were denied access to the facility, and Senator Andy Kim (D) was pepper sprayed by ICE while trying to de-escalate.

Governor Sherrill ordered the New Jersey State Police (NJSP) to take over operations outside the facility for ICE, and she also established "protest zones" for protesters to move inside, while Newark mayor Ras Baraka (D) established an overnight curfew surrounding Delaney Hall. Riot police were then repeatedly deployed and used batons, pepper spray, tear gas, flash grenades, rubber bullets, horseback police, SWAT teams, armored vehicles, and undercover police to disperse, kettle, arrest, and criminally charge protesters who refused to leave, with many journalists being injured and arrested.

The Department of Homeland Security (DHS) has characterized protesters as being outside agitators and rioters, saying "There is NO hunger strike at Delaney Hall. There are NO subprime conditions or abuse at the facility." Governor Sherrill accused some protesters of being from "national extremist groups" without naming specific groups, and Mayor Baraka has criticized both protesters and police, saying the police's actions were "in some cases, unconstitutional." Municipal, state, and federal actions have sparked significant backlash from the political left and advocacy groups. Reporters Without Borders characterized the government's actions as "repression typical of an authoritarian regime."

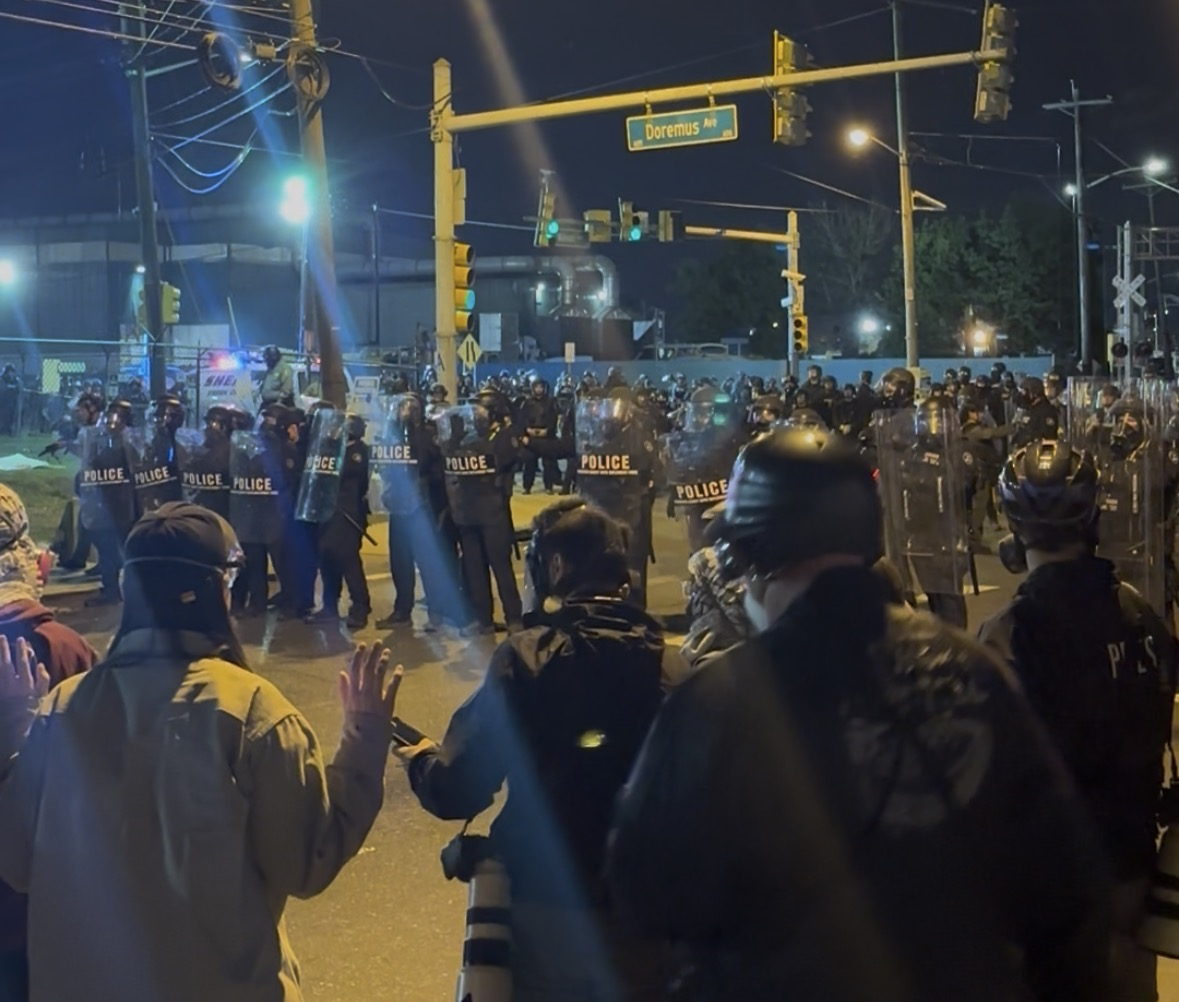
- New Jersey State Police (NJSP) shortly before the kettle
- NJSP begin kettling protesters and journalists
- NJSP arrest a protester sitting down inside the kettle
- Protesters sing We Shall Not Be Moved during the kettle, May 31, 2026

===== Curfew mass arrests =====
On the morning of Sunday May 31, Newark mayor Ras Baraka announced an overnight curfew imposed by the Newark Police Division (NPD) in half-mile radius surrounding Delaney Hall between the hours of 9:00pm and 6:00am. Sherrill supported the curfew, saying "violent, chaotic clashes hurt everyone. They put the lives of both protesters and law enforcement in danger. They take the focus away from the people inside Delaney Hall and their families. And they raise the temperature with ICE." At around the same time, the Department of Homeland Security (DHS) posted on X saying the area around the facility had been secured and that they "WON'T BACK DOWN."

An hour before the curfew, military-grade armored vehicles arrived on the scene. At 8:30pm, the New Jersey State Police (NJSP) issued a verbal warning about the curfew in English and Spanish, prompting many to disperse. Shortly after, a line of NJSP riot police with riot shields blocked every exit on the street. At around 10pm, hundreds of riot police began running and surrounded over 61 peaceful protesters and members of the press in a kettle. Some members of the media reported being run out of the area.

Inside the kettle, a senior officer emerged from behind the shields and said "Listen up. If you are press, you got the opportunity right now — and that's it — to leave. If you don't leave out here in an orderly fashion, you are coming with us." He then pointed at someone in the group and snapped "You are not press."

After the announcement, protesters began chanting "Press don't leave!" After members of the press were escorted from the kettle, they were chased away by police until they were about 100 feet (30 meters) from the kettle. The NPD then ordered press to go even further down the road from where they were recording the kettle, prompting objections and a confrontation. Over an officer's radio, a voice said "If they refuse to move, push them back yourselves."

Everyone who remained in the kettle was arrested, making for 61 total arrests. During the arrests, riot police tightened the kettle, "cramming journalists and protesters closer together." Multiple members of the press were denied exit, including a conservative commentator who ended up with a black eye. At least three journalists in the kettle were arrested and spent a full day in custody while lawyers were denied access to see them. One of the arrested journalists, wearing a blue vest with the word "press" and an ID from his company dangled around his neck, was a member of the National Press Photographers Association. He was arrested by officers after being told his credentials were not verified. The Guardian later asked the governor's office and mayor's office what "verified" credentials meant and did not receive a response. Another of the arrested journalists was injured and taken to a hospital, where he said two arrested protesters were also being treated for injuries from the arrests. One journalist claimed they were charged with felony rioting and resisting arrest. The Freedom of the Press Foundation member said after the incident, "at least three of those arrested ended up in the hospital. Do I really need to explain why press cameras needed to be rolling?"

The New Jersey Office of the Public Defender (OPD) said all of the complaints they examined included fourth-degree rioting and resisting arrest felony charges, which carry a maximum sentence of 18 months in prison. The people arrested were taken to the Essex County Correctional Facility and held for over 24 hours because the NPD was slow to process them. The OPD said this was "unnecessary and really not something that happens very often," and the office said charging with felonies was a "big reach" based on the "kind of conduct we were seeing from protesters on the ground." A lawyer in the OPD said all the complaints he examined by police used "boilerplate language listing the offenses said to be committed by the crowd collectively, without offering detail on what any individual is accused of doing." He said "The police have not made out the barest minimum of probable cause," and the office said these cases were typically charged via summons rather than an arrest warrant.

Eighteen press freedom organizations co-signed a public condemnation of the arrests, including the American Society of Journalists and Authors (ASJA); Coalition For Women In Journalism (CFWIJ); Committee to Protect Journalists (CPJ); The Deadline Club; The Free Press (CBS News); Freedom of the Press Foundation (FPF); International Women's Media Foundation (IWMF); Investigative Reporters and Editors (IRE); National Press Photographers Association (NPPA); National Press Club (NPC), including the National Press Club Journalism Institute; New York Press Club (NYPC); New Jersey Society of Professional Journalists; PEN America; Radio Television Digital News Association (RTDNA); Reporters Without Borders (RSF); Society of Environmental Journalists (SEJ); and Society of Professional Journalists (SPJ). The letter alleged First Amendment violations by law enforcement and demanded the dropping of charges against journalists arrested. The committee to Protect Journalists said "This type of behavior has no place in a democracy." The Free Press said arrests of journalists were intended to "chill coverage" of abuses during the arrests. Reporters Without Borders said "these attacks are unconstitutional repression typical of an authoritarian regime."

Shortly after the arrests, New Jersey Attorney General Jennifer Davenport issued a statement thanking police for "de-escalating" the situation and saying those arrested were "armed" with helmets, shields, and gas masks. DHS retweeted a post on X bragging about kettling the protesters. Baraka lifted the curfew the next day.

The OPD, representing roughly 40 out of the 61 people arrested, said over half of arrestees were approached by Federal Bureau of Investigation (FBI) agents for questioning after the FBI obtained arrestee telephone records and address information from criminal complaints from the arrests. The OPD claimed friends and family of arrestees were approached, and the FBI also arrived outside their apartments for knock and talks. The OPD argued this violated their right to legal representation.

Governor Sherrill defended the police response at the protests. When a caller during a phone-in likened the state police response to Operation Metro Surge federal crackdowns in Minneapolis, Sherrill denied the comparison, saying "Nobody [was] certainly killed in this instance" (referring to the killings of Renée Good and Alex Pretti). The next day, protesters carried signs critical of Governor Sherrill, accusing her of making things worse and "lying about Delaney Hall." Protesters also chanted "Hey, Mikie, WTF?"

Baraka released a public statement condemning the actions of police over the weekend, saying the NJSP "kind of resembled what ICE was doing in the first place" and characterizing their behavior as "overly aggressive, unnecessary and in some cases, unconstitutional."

===== Undercover police =====
On Wednesday June 3, the Newark Police Division (NPD) assigned undercover police to infiltrate protests outside the facility. The police assigned were two detectives wearing plainclothes. ICE agents initiated an ambush by flanking protesters with a minivan, exiting the vehicle, and surrounding them, and the detectives then made a targeted arrest against a 30-year-old protester in the crowd. The protester was later accused of dragging tarp into a fire on Saturday May 30.

The American Civil Liberties Union said, "The use of plainclothes officers presents the concern of people constantly being surveilled when they are engaging in First Amendment-protected activity." An uninvolved defense attorney commented "at what point do the actions of these undercover agents become a pressure tactic as opposed to a law enforcement tactic?" The Intercept alleges the NPD's official statement on the operation elides their cooperation with ICE.

===== Baraka's reactions =====
Baraka's response to the protests has been mixed, including both criticism of "outside agitator" protesters as well as criticism of some use of force by police. After the Newark Police Department (NPD) responded to protests, he said "it appeared that some of our officers were over aggressive and should be held accountable." Baraka also criticized the NPD after they intervened in the blocking of ICE vehicles by protesters, saying "The responsibility for maintaining secure access to the facility lies with GEO." In another public statement, Baraka said the protests outside Delaney Hall had been peaceful for the year leading up to the hunger strike until "a sharp and troubling shift occurred. ICE increased its presence and engaged protesters in ways that escalated tensions and led to unnecessary confrontation."

== 2025 gubernatorial campaign ==
On February 19, 2024, Baraka announced that he would run for governor of New Jersey in the 2025 election. He called for a "progressive overhaul" in New Jersey, and his campaign agenda included "reparations, sanctuary state laws, baby bonds, and [a] universal basic income". At a February 20, 2024, event at Rowan University, Baraka called incarceration and policing in New Jersey “uneven, costly and racist.”

Following the April 2024 death of U.S. representative Donald Payne Jr., who represented the 10th congressional district, Baraka was mentioned as a potential candidate in the upcoming special election. However, Baraka chose not to run for the seat and continued his gubernatorial candidacy.

In July 2024, the New Jersey Globe said that Baraka looked to be "the Bernie Sanders of the 2025 governor’s race", positioning himself as the furthest left of the Democratic candidates.

In the Democratic primary on June 10, 2025, Baraka lost the Democratic nomination to Mikie Sherrill, a U.S. representative. Sherrill received 34% of the vote; Baraka received 21.7%, finishing second; mayor Steven Fulop of Jersey City finished third with 16%.

== Personal life ==
Baraka is the father of three daughters. In 2019, he married political consultant Linda Jumah. Baraka and Jumah had a son in 2019.

Through his father, some of Baraka's half-sisters are Kellie and Lisa Jones and Dominique di Prima. (Jones was their father's last name at the time they were born.)

== See also ==
- List of mayors of Newark, New Jersey
- Street Fight (film)

Political offices
Preceded by Luis Quintana	Mayor of Newark; 2014–present	Incumbent
