= 2022 Newark mayoral election =

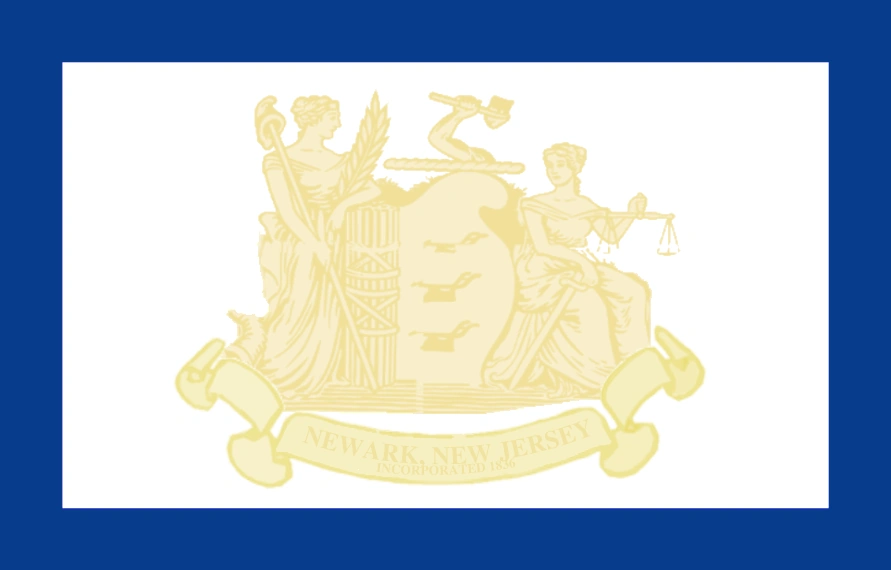
- May 10, 2022
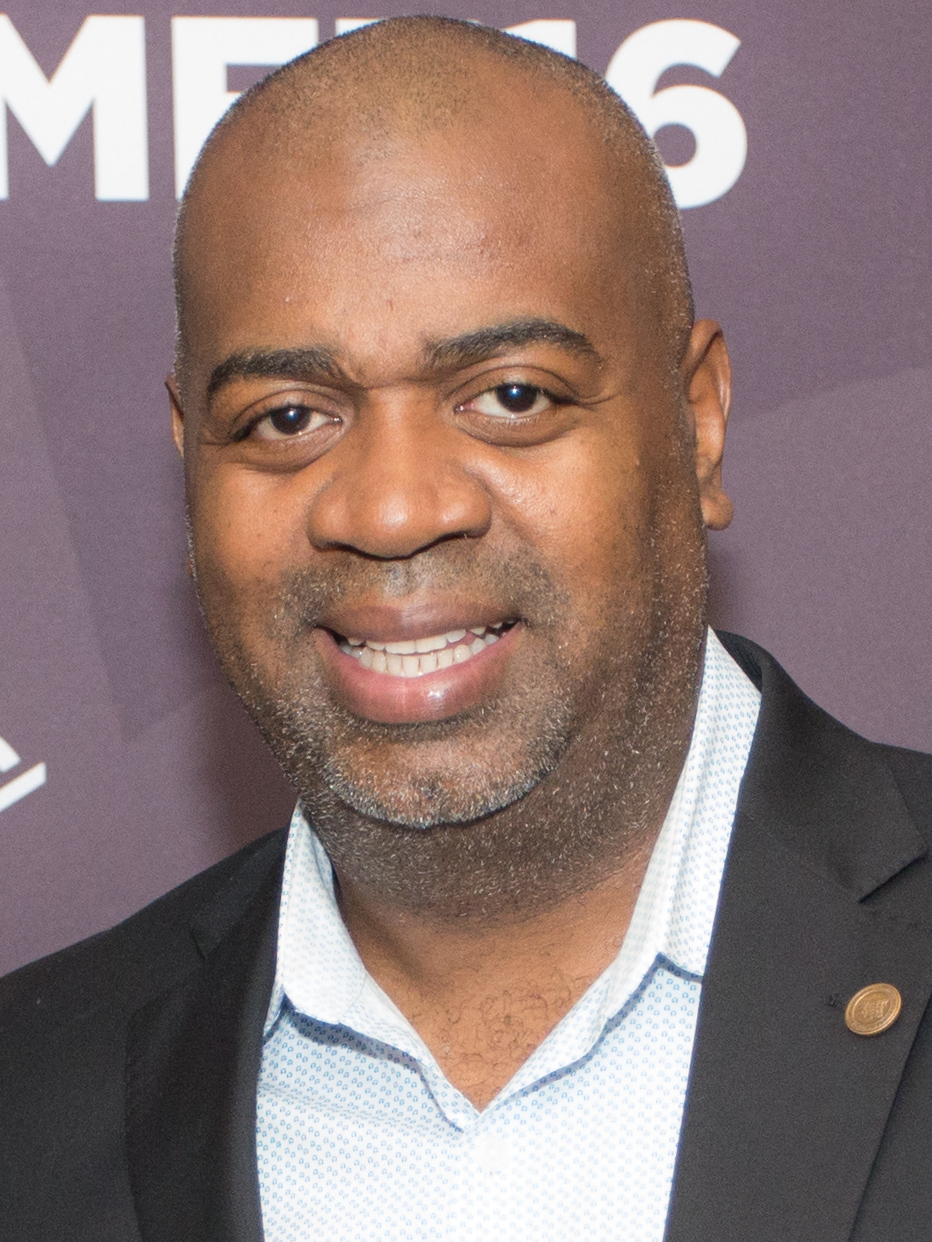

| Candidate | Ras Baraka | Sheila Montague |
| Popular vote | 14,777 | 3,007 |
| Percentage | 83.1% | 16.9% |
Mayor before election
Ras Baraka
Democratic
Elected mayor
Ras Baraka
Democratic

The 2022 Newark mayoral election was held on May 10, 2022, to elect the Mayor of Newark, New Jersey. Elections for all seats on the nine member Municipal Council of Newark were held on the same day. Elections were non-partisan and candidates were not listed by political party. Incumbent Mayor Ras Baraka ran for re-election and easily won a third term.

== Candidates ==
- Ras Baraka, incumbent Mayor of Newark
- Sheila Montague, Newark Public Schools teacher and founding member of Parents United for Local School Education

== Results ==
2022 Newark mayoral election
| Candidate | Votes | % |
|---|---|---|
| Ras Baraka (incumbent) | 14,777 | 83.09 |
| Sheila Montague | 3,007 | 16.91 |
| Total votes | 17,784 | 100.00 |
