= Luis A. Quintana =

American politician (born 1960)

39th Mayor of Newark
- In office October 31, 2013 – June 30, 2014; Acting: October 31, 2013 – November 4, 2013
- Preceded by: Cory Booker
- Succeeded by: Ras Baraka

Member of the Newark Municipal Council, At-Large
- Incumbent
- Assumed office 2014
- In office 1994–2013

Personal details
- Born: January 29, 1960 (age 66) Añasco, Puerto Rico
- Party: Democratic
- Education: Seton Hall University (BA)

Luis A. Quintana (born January 29, 1960) is an American politician who served as Councilmember-at-Large of the Municipal Council of Newark, New Jersey, first elected in 1994. He served as Mayor of Newark from November 2013 to July 2014, after which he was re-elected to his council seat.

== Background ==
Quintana was born in Añasco, Puerto Rico. In 1967, at the age of seven, he and his family moved to Newark, where he later graduated from Barringer High School. He holds a bachelor's degree in criminal justice from Seton Hall University.

== Councilman-at-Large ==
In 1986 Quintana became deputy mayor under Sharpe James. He later became become Councilman-at-Large of the Municipal Council of Newark in 1994. He became council president in September 2013. Quintana ran unsuccessfully in the 2003 primary and 2007 election for New Jersey State Senator for the 29th Legislative District, which was won by Teresa Ruiz.

Quintana was re-elected in May 2014.

== Mayor ==
After having won the October 16 special election for U.S. senator to replace the late Frank Lautenberg, Cory Booker resigned as mayor and was sworn in on October 31, 2013, as the junior U.S. senator from New Jersey.

While rules state that any Newark resident can be selected as interim mayor by a vote of the municipal council, convention calls for the president to ascend to the post. However, council president Donald Payne Jr. had resigned in November 2012 to take a seat in Congress. This left the position vacant and the council with eight instead of nine members. Payne's resignation led to a power struggle for the vacant council seat in which opponents contested Booker's appointment and an eventual judicial ruling left it vacant until a November 2013 special election. Quintana was the longest serving councilman and had allies on both sides of the political divide, which tends to fall along racial lines.

Quintana was voted council president on September 19, 2013, in a near-unanimous vote by seven colleagues, with one abstention by Quintana himself. He became acting mayor on October 31, 2013, and was sworn in on November 4, 2013, assuming the unexpired term of Booker, which ended on June 30, 2014. He is the first Latino mayor of Newark, the total population of which is one-third Latino and 13% Puerto Rican.

Quintana's style is considered to be considerably different than Booker's, particularly the use of social media. Whereas Booker was known for his contacts outside the established political network, Quintana was expected to staff city hall from within local political establishment. Since Newark received $32 million in emergency state aid in 2011 and 2012, a memorandum of understanding between Newark and the state requires the city to request and the state approve hiring of city hall staff, which they initially did not do, and later denied.

== Mayoral election 2014 ==
Quintana's term ended on June 30, 2014. He declined to run for mayor 2014 elections. Quintana was seen as an ideal interim mayor because he was "someone who wasn't planning to run and is well-steeped in the minutiae of running Newark." None of the mayoral candidates sought the position since not only "would it be difficult to run the city for the first time while campaigning, it would be hard to demand change in a city while running it." "I am not considering a run for mayor of Newark, and I've said that before,..My only mission is to be the gatekeeper, and to give the citizens of Newark a model for future mayors to come." said Quintana in December 2012.

As quoted in the Newark-based newspaper, the Star-Ledger, Rutgers University professor Clement Price characterized the election as the "first mayoral race after the long drama associated with the ending of Mayor Sharpe James' last term and the national ascent of Cory Booker" and "wonders whether the local and national attention in this campaign will be anywhere proximate to the life and times of Cory Booker and Newark." Booker's departure prompted an earlier than normal start to electoral campaigns.

Municipal elections in Newark are nonpartisan and are held the 2nd Tuesday in May (May 13, 2014). Booker's election, and eventual departure, as well as shifting demographics, have been instrumental in changing the political climate and political alliances in Newark. The percentage of Latinos in Newark has grown considerably between 1980 and 2010, from 18.6% to 33.8%; that of blacks has slightly decreased from 58.2% to 52.4%. While municipal elections have seen black-Latino coalitions, voting tends to remain racially polarized.

== See also ==
- Mayors of Newark, New Jersey
- Municipal Council of Newark
- Street Fight (film)
- Brick City (TV series)

Political offices
| Preceded by Cory Booker | Mayor of Newark, New Jersey; 2013–2014 | Succeeded by Ras Baraka |
