= Municipal Council of Newark =

Local government of American city

The Municipal Council is the legislative branch of government for Newark, New Jersey.

Newark was governed by a mayor and common council from 1836 to 1917 and then by a five-member commission until 1954.

Effective as of July 1, 1954, the voters of the city of Newark, by a referendum held on November 3, 1953, and under the Optional Municipal Charter Law (commonly known as the Faulkner Act), adopted the Faulkner Act (Mayor-Council) Plan C as the form of local government.

There are nine council members elected on a nonpartisan basis at the regular municipal election or at the general election for terms of four years: one council member from each of five wards and four council members on an at-large basis. The mayor is also elected for a term of four years.

Municipal elections in Newark are nonpartisan and are held on the second Tuesday in May. A council candidate seeking a post in a ward must receive more than 50 percent of the vote. If a candidate does not receive a majority, a run-off election is held with the two candidates with the greatest number of votes.

Council members choose their own president and until 2014, when the position was eliminated, vice president.

== Members ==
As of July 1, 2026 council members were:

- Luis A. Quintana (Council President & Member-at-Large)
- Amina Bey (Council Member, Central Ward)
- Patrick O. Council (Council Member, South Ward)
- C. Lawrence Crump (Council Member-at-Large)
- Donna Jackson (Council Member-at-Large)
- Dupré L. Kelly (Council Member, West Ward)
- Anibal Ramos Jr. (Council Member, North Ward)
- Louise Scott-Rountree (Council Member-at-Large)
- Michael J. Silva (Council Member, East Ward)

== Mayor ==
The mayor may cast a tie-breaking vote on the municipal council when there is an equal number of yes and no votes. The Mayor can also call for meetings of the council outside those regularly scheduled.

The Newark mayoral election took place May 13, 2014 and was won by Ras Baraka. Luis A. Quintana had stepped down as Council President to be sworn in as mayor on November 4, 2013, following the resignation of Cory Booker, completing the term which ended June 30, 2014. Baraka also won the 2018 election and the 2022 election.

== Council members since 1954 ==
=== Council presidents ===
- John A. Brady, 1954–1958
- Michael A. Bontempo, 1958–1962
- Ralph A. Villani, 1962–1970
- Louis Turco, 1970–1973
- Frank G. Megaro, 1973–1974
- Earl Harris, 1974–1982
- Ralph T. Grant Jr., 1982–1986
- Henry Martinez, 1986–1990
- Ralph T. Grant Jr., 1990–1991
- Donald Tucker, 1991–1992
- Donald Bradley, 1992–1993
- Gary Harris, 1993–1994
- Donald Bradley, 1994–2006
- Mildred C. Crump, 2006–2010, 2013–2021
- Donald Payne Jr., 2010–2012
- Luis A. Quintana, 2013, 2021–2022, 2026-
- LaMonica McIver, 2022–2024
- C. Lawrence Crump, 2024–2026

=== Council vice presidents ===
- Luis A. Quintana, 2006–2010, 2018–2021
- Anibal Ramos Jr., 2010–2013
- Augusto Amador, 2013–2014
- Position temporarily eliminated late 2014 – May 2015.
- Augusto Amador 2015–2018
- LaMonica McIver, 2021–2022
- Position eliminated, 2022

=== Council members at-large ===
- Michael A. Bontempo, 1954–1966, 1970–1974
- John A. Brady, 1954–1966
- James T. Callaghan, 1954–1962, 1966–1968
- Jack Waldor, 1954–1958
- Raymond V. Santoro, 1958–1962
- Anna Santoro, 1962
- Anthony Giuliano, 1962–1968
- Ralph A. Villani, 1962–1973
- Leon Ewing, 1968
- Anthony J. Giuliano, 1968–1978
- Anthony Imperiale, 1968–1970
- Calvin D. West, 1966–1970
- Sharpe James, 1982–1986
- Earl Harris, 1970–1982, 1986–1988
- Marie L. Villani, 1973–1993
- Ralph T. Grant Jr. 1978–1994
- Gary Harris, 1988–1995
- Gayle Chaneyfield Jenkins, 1995–2006
- Mildred C. Crump, 1994–1998, 2006–2021
- Donald K. Tucker, 1974–2005
- Luis A. Quintana, 1994–2013, 2014–
- Bessie Walker, 1998–2006
- Ras Baraka, 2005–2006
- Carlos M. Gonzalez 2006–2026
- Donald M. Payne Jr., 2006–2012
- Eddie Osborne, 2014–2022
- C. Lawrence Crump, 2021–
- Louise Scott-Rountree, 2022–
- Donna Jackson, 2026-

=== North Ward council members ===
- Mario V. Farco, 1954–1958
- Joseph V. Melillo, 1958–1970
- Frank G. Megaro, 1970–1974
- Anthony Carrino, 1974–2002
- Hector M. Corchado, 2002–2006
- Anibal Ramos Jr., 2006–

=== East Ward council members ===
- Phillip Gordon, 1954–1968
- Louis Turco, 1968–1974
- Finney J. Alati 1974
- Henry Martinez, 1974–1998
- Augusto Amador, 1998–2022
- Michael J. Silva, 2022–

=== West Ward council members ===
- M. Joseph Gallagher, 1954–1958
- Frank Addonizio, 1958–1970
- Michael P. Bottone, 1970–1982
- Ronald L. Rice, 1982–1998
- Mamie Bridgeforth, 1998–2006
- Ronald C. Rice, 2006–2014
- Joseph A. McCallum Jr., 2014–2022
- Dupré L. Kelly, 2022–

=== South Ward council members ===
- Samuel Cooper, 1954–1957
- Sophie Cooper, 1957–1962
- Lee Bernstein, 1962–1969
- Horace P. Sharper, 1969–1970
- Sharpe James, 1970–1982
- Donald M. Payne Sr., 1982–1989
- Donald Bradley, 1989–2006
- Oscar S. James, II, 2006–2010
- Ras Baraka, 2010–2014
- John Sharpe James, 2014–2022
- Patrick O. Council, 2022–

=== Central Ward council members ===
- Irvine I Turner, 1954–1970
- Dennis Westbrooks, 1970–1974
- Jesse Allen, 1974–1978
- Benjamin F. Johnson, III, 1978–1982
- George Branch, 1982–1998
- Cory Booker, 1998–2002
- Charles A. Bell, 2002–2006, 2008–2010
- Dana Rone, 2006–2008
- Darrin S. Sharif, 2010–2014
- Gayle Chaneyfield Jenkins, 2014–2018
- LaMonica McIver, 2018–2024
- Amina Bey, 2025-
