= List of elections in 1901 =

The following elections occurred in the year 1901.

== Africa ==
- 1901 Liberian general election

== Europe ==
- 1901 Dalmatian parliamentary election
- 1901 Danish Folketing election
- 1901 Danish local elections
- 1901 Dutch general election
- 1901 Faroese general election
- 1901 Hungarian parliamentary election
- 1901 Portuguese legislative election
- 1901 Romanian general election
- 1901 Serbian National Assembly election
- 1901 Spanish general election

=== United Kingdom ===
- 1901 Berkshire Northern by-election
- 1901 Cork City by-election
- 1901 Essex Northeastern by-election
- 1901 Galway Borough by-election
- 1901 Lanarkshire Northeast by-election
- 1901 Liverpool Kirkdale by-election
- 1901 Maidstone by-election
- 1901 Monmouth Boroughs by-election
- 1901 Saffron Walden by-election
- 1901 Stretford by-election
- 1901 West Monmouthshire by-election

== North America ==
=== Canada ===
- 1901 Edmonton municipal election
- 1901 Nova Scotia general election

=== Cuba ===
- 1901 Cuban general election

=== United States ===
- 1901 Iowa Senate election
- 1901 New York state election

==== United States gubernatorial ====
- 1901 Iowa gubernatorial election
- 1901 Massachusetts gubernatorial election
- 1901 New Jersey gubernatorial election
- 1901 Ohio gubernatorial election
- 1901 Rhode Island gubernatorial election
- 1901 United States gubernatorial elections
- 1901 Virginia gubernatorial election

==== United States House of Representatives ====
- 1901 United States House of Representatives elections
- 1901 South Carolina's 7th congressional district special election

==== United States Senate ====
- 1900–01 United States Senate elections
- 1901–02 United States Senate elections
- 1901 United States Senate election in Massachusetts
- 1901 United States Senate special election in Pennsylvania

==== United States mayoral elections ====
- 1901 Auburn, Alabama municipal election
- 1901 Boston mayoral election
- 1901 Chicago mayoral election
- 1901 Cleveland mayoral election
- 1901 New York City mayoral election
- 1901 San Diego mayoral election
- 1901 San Francisco mayoral election

== Oceania ==
=== Australia ===
- 1901 Australian Senate election
- 1901 Australian federal election
- 1901 Condoublin state by-election
- 1901 Darling Downs by-election
- 1901 Flinders state by-election
- 1901 Hume state by-election
- 1901 Melbourne state by-election
- 1901 West Adelaide state by-election
- 1901 Western Australian state election

=== New Zealand ===
- 1901 Caversham by-election
- 1901 City of Christchurch by-election
- 1901 Northern Maori by-election
- 1901 New Zealand local elections

== South America ==
- 1901 Chilean presidential election
- 1901 Ecuadorian presidential election
- 1901 Uruguayan parliamentary election

== See also ==
- Category:1901 elections
