= 1901 United States gubernatorial elections =

| ← 1900 | November 5, 1901 | 1902 → |

6 governorships
| | Majority party | Minority party |
|---|---|---|
| Party | Republican | Democratic |
| Seats before | 26 | 18 |
| Seats after | 26 | 18 |
| Seat change | Steady | Steady |
| Seats up | 5 | 1 |
| Seats won | 5 | 1 |
| | Third party |
| Party | Silver |
| Seats before | 1 |
| Seats after | 1 |
| Seat change | Steady |
| Seats up | 0 |
| Seats won | 0 |
- Democratic gain Democratic hold Republican gain Republican hold

United States gubernatorial elections were held on November 5, 1901, in six states.

Virginia holds its gubernatorial elections in odd numbered years, every 4 years, following the United States presidential election year. New Jersey at this time held gubernatorial elections every 3 years. It would abandon this practice in 1949. Massachusetts and Rhode Island at this time held gubernatorial elections every year. They would abandon this practice in 1920 and 1912, respectively. Iowa and Ohio at this time held gubernatorial elections in every odd numbered year.

In Rhode Island, the gubernatorial election was held on the same day as federal elections for the first time. Elections in this state had previously been held in April.

== Results ==
| State | Incumbent | Party | Status | Opposing candidates |
|---|---|---|---|---|
| Iowa | L. M. Shaw | Republican | Retired, Republican victory | Albert B. Cummins (Republican) 58.09% T. J. Phillips (Democratic) 36.81% A. U. Coates (Prohibition) 4.01% James Baxter (Socialist) 0.89% Luman H. Weller (People's) 0.20% |
| Massachusetts | Winthrop Murray Crane | Republican | Re-elected, 57.26% | Josiah Quincy (Democratic) 35.24% George H. Wrenn (Social Democrat) 3.29% Michael T. Berry (Socialist Labor) 2.74% John B. Lewis (Prohibition) 1.47% |
| New Jersey | Foster McGowan Voorhees | Republican | Term-limited, Republican victory | Franklin Murphy (Republican) 50.88% James M. Seymour (Democratic) 46.14% Joel W. Brown (Prohibition) 1.49% Charles H. Vail (Socialist) 0.97% Frank W. Wilson (Socialist Labor) 0.53% |
| Ohio | George K. Nash | Republican | Re-elected, 52.70% | James Kilbourne (Democratic) 44.53% E. Jay Pinney (Prohibition) 1.19% Harry C. Thompson (Socialist) 0.89% John H. T. Juergens (Socialist Labor) 0.36% John Richardson (Union Reform) 0.33% |
| Rhode Island | William Gregory | Republican | Re-elected, 53.64% (Note: Gregory died on December 16, 1901, before his re-inauguration, and was succeeded by the Lieutenant Governor, Charles D. Kimball (R).) | Lucius F. C. Garvin (Democratic) 39.93% William E. Brightman (Prohibition) 4.08% James P. Reid (Socialist Labor) 2.35% |
| Virginia | James Hoge Tyler | Democratic | Term-limited, Democratic victory | Andrew Jackson Montague (Democratic) 58.20% John Hampton Hoge (Republican) 40.58% O. C. Rucker (Prohibition) 0.95% H. D. McTier (Socialist Labor) 0.14% J. J. Quantz (Socialist Labor) 0.14% |
