= Grace Church (Newark) =

Historic church in New Jersey, United States

- U.S. National Register of Historic Places
- U.S. National Historic Landmark
- New Jersey Register of Historic Places
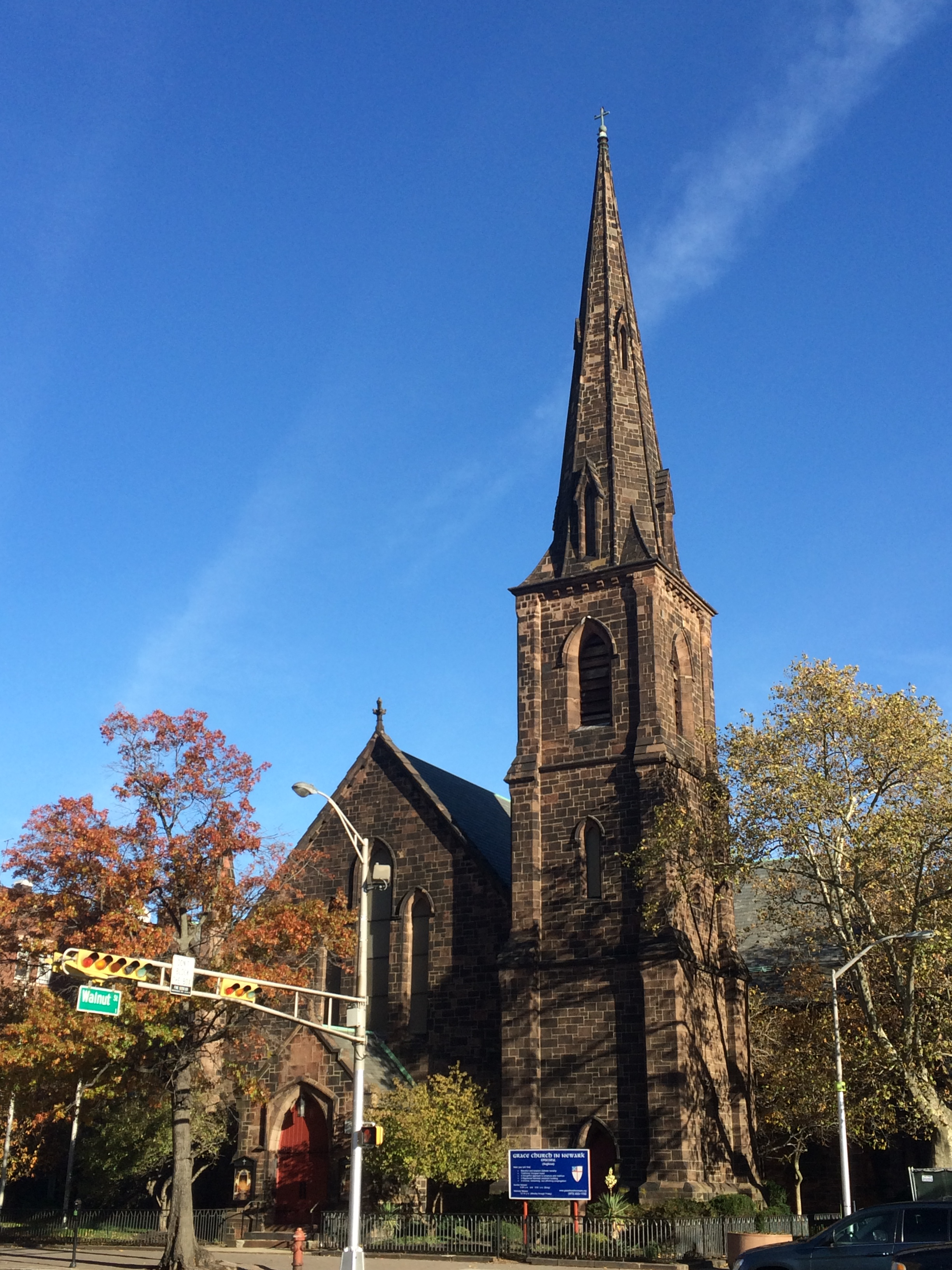

- Location within Essex County, New Jersey Location within New Jersey Location within the United States
- Location: 950 Broad Street, Newark, New Jersey
- Coordinates: 40°43′50.22″N 74°10′27.77″W
- Built: 1847
- Architects: Richard Upjohn, C. Harrison Condit
- Architectural style: Gothic Revival
- NRHP reference No.: 72000776
- NJRHP No.

Significant dates
- Added to NRHP: November 2, 1972
- Designated NHL: December 23, 1987

Grace Church in Newark (Episcopal) is an active and historic Episcopal Church in the Diocese of Newark. Founded in 1837, it has occupied a building on Broad Street in Newark, New Jersey, US, since 1848. It worships in the Anglo-Catholic tradition.

The church reported 191 members in 2019 and 150 members in 2025. Plate and pledge income reported for the congregation in 2025 was $121,625 with average Sunday attendance (ASA) of 57 persons. This was a relative decrease on ASA of 82 reported in 2015.

== History ==
Grace Church was founded on Ascension Day in 1837 at the behest of Bishop George Washington Doane. As part of what is today called the Oxford Movement, Grace's founders emphasized the sacramental worship and succession of bishops of the Episcopal Church as their direct link to Christ, the Apostolic community and its Eucharistic worship – a sister to the Roman Catholic Church. A daughter parish of Trinity Church, Bishop Doane explicitly founded the church in the growing city to be the standard-bearer for Anglo-Catholicism in the diocese.

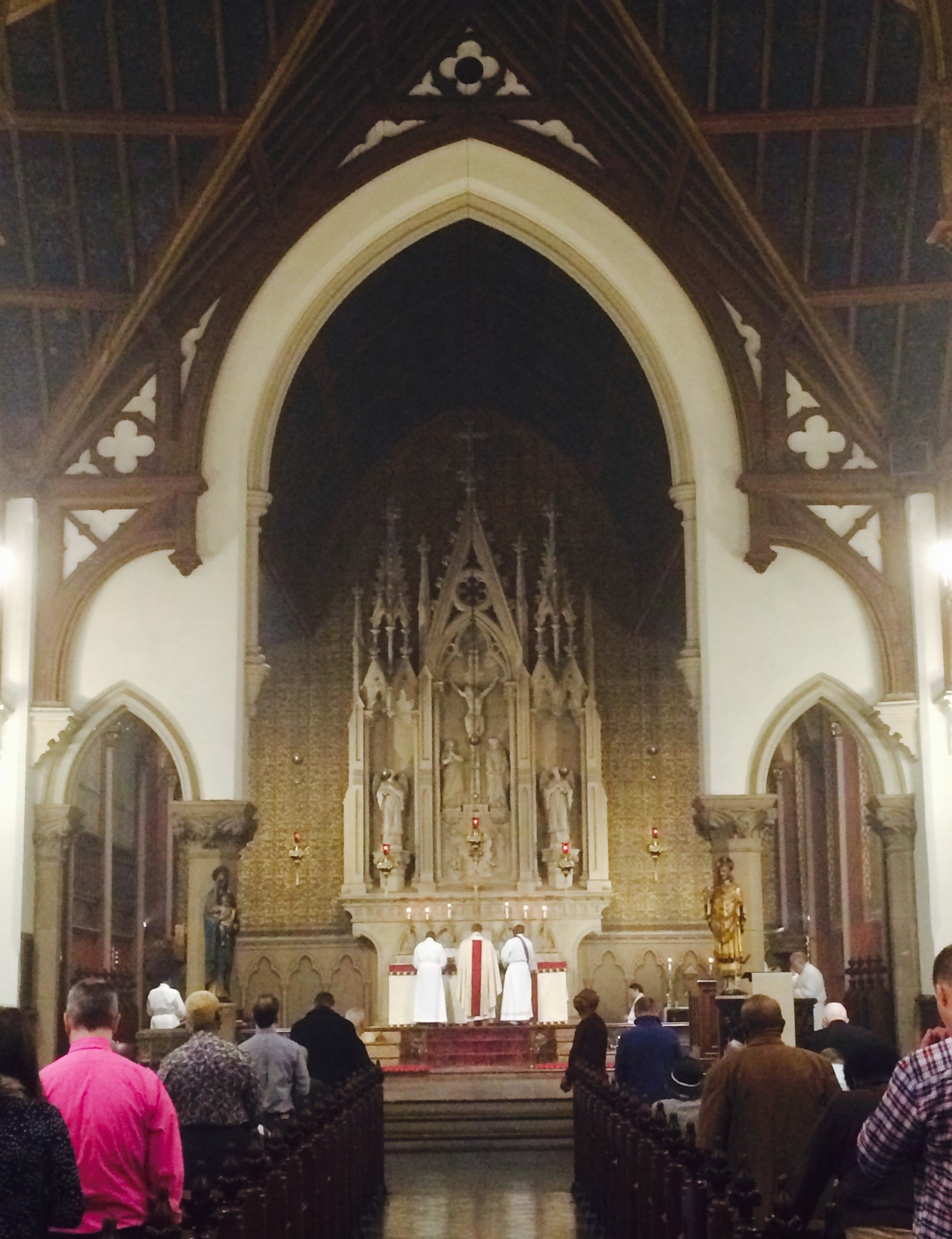
10:30am High Mass at Grace Church in Newark.

The church building, designed by Richard Upjohn, who was also the architect of Trinity Church, New York, was consecrated on October 5, 1848. It is an example of Gothic Revival architecture in the United States, and was designated a National Historic Landmark for its architecture in 1987. The church was built on the site of the old Essex County Courthouse and Jail, which burnt down on August 15, 1835. The massive, single bell in the tower was an early replacement for one purchased and installed before the consecration in 1848; the original bell produced a horrible sound, drawing complaints from parishioners and local citizens, and was replaced with a "more agreeable toned bell" purchased by Jermiah C. Garthwaite, one of the 1837 founding members of the church. The bell, paid for by an Episcopalian textile manufacture in Newark, is rung for solemn occasions, and was rung to support the Federal soldiers defending Fort Sumter in 1861.

The tune for "America the Beautiful," called "Materna," was written here by the parish organist Samuel A. Ward in 1882.

== Today ==
Grace uses an Anglo-Catholic, sacramental liturgy, or order of service, at the center of which is the Eucharist, also known as Holy Communion or the Mass. Grace teaches the Catholic faith, holding that Christians gain access to the mystical body of Christ through the sacramental worship of the community and are aided by the sequential liturgy, incense, and Eucharistic sacrifice to an experience of heaven. Incense, lights, and ceremonial vestments are used. The contemporary-language rite from the 1979 Book of Common Prayer (Rite II) is used. Grace holds High Mass on occasion, with liturgy sung in Latin by the ordained clergy. In celebration of Martin Luther King Jr. Day in January 2020, a mass was celebrated with music performed by choirs from Grace Church and other nearby areas.

The congregation includes people from Africa, the Caribbean, Europe, Caucasian Americans, and African Americans of all ages and sexual orientation. The parish follows Catholic faith and practice in The Episcopal Church, but accepts the ordination of women and affirmation of same-sex marriage.

=== Notable parishioners ===
William Stryker Gummere, Chief Justice of the New Jersey Supreme Court 1901 to 1933.

Oliver Spencer Halstead, fourth mayor of Newark.

Joseph E. Haynes, 20th mayor of Newark.

John White Howell, electrical engineer with Thomas Edison.

John Jelliff, American furniture designer and manufacturer.

Anthony Quinton Keasbey, US Attorney for New Jersey and poet.

Robert H. McCarter, Attorney General of New Jersey 1903-1908

Thomas L. Raymond, mayor of Newark, 1915-1917 and 1925-1928.

George M. Wallhauser Jr., Chair of the Essex County Republican Organization, candidate for the U.S. House of Representatives in 1968, Chair of the New Jersey Highway Authority.

Samuel Augustus Ward, organist and composer.

Peter J. Woolley, American political scientist.

=== Music ===
Grace has an adult choir and a chorister program, performing mass and weekly singing the Gregorian chant mass propers from the early, medieval and renaissance traditions. Grace holds choir concerts and organ recitals on the 48-stop tracker instrument built by Casavant Frères in 1990. Past directors of music include James McGregor, a composer, conductor, and organist who held the position for forty-eight years and was widely known throughout the Episcopal Church.

== See also ==
- National Register of Historic Places listings in Essex County, New Jersey
- Episcopal Church
