= Charles Gifford =

Charles Gifford may refer to:

- Charles Gifford (astronomer) (1861–1948), New Zealand explorer and astronomer
- Charles Gifford (Canadian politician) (1821–1896), member of the Ontario provincial legislature
- Charles K. Gifford (born 1942), corporate director of CBS
- Charles L. Gifford (1871–1947), American congressman from Massachusetts
- Charles Alling Gifford (1860–1937), architect in the United States
- Charles L. C. Gifford (1825–1877), American attorney and politician in New Jersey
- Charles Henry Gifford (1839–1904), American painter
