= Senator Crowell =

Senator Crowell may refer to:

- Jason Crowell (born 1972), Missouri State Senate
- John Crowell (Ohio politician) (1801–1883), Ohio State Senate
- Joseph T. Crowell (1817–1891), New Jersey State Senate
- Steve Crowell (fl. 2020s), Arkansas State Senate
