= Alexander Archibald =

Alexander Archibald may refer to:

- Alexander Archibald (politician) (1869–1922), mayor of Newark, New Jersey
- Alexander Lackie Archibald (1788–1859), farmer, tanner, boot manufacturer and politician in Nova Scotia
- Sandy Archibald, Alexander "Sandy" Archibald, (1897–1946), Scottish footballer
