= Senator Gifford =

Senator Gifford may refer to:

- Charles L. C. Gifford (1825–1877), New Jersey State Senate
- Charles L. Gifford (1871–1947), Massachusetts State Senate
- Gabby Giffords (born 1970), Arizona State Senate
