= Henry Meade Doremus =

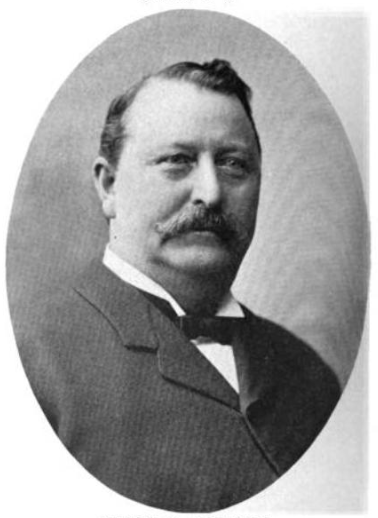

23rd Mayor of Newark
- In office January 1, 1903 – January 1, 1907
- Preceded by: James M. Seymour
- Succeeded by: Jacob Haussling

Sheriff of Essex County, New Jersey
- In office 1897–1899

Member of the New Jersey General Assembly from Essex County
- In office 1885

Personal details
- Born: May 23, 1851 Jacksonville, Morris County, New Jersey
- Died: January 16, 1921 (aged 69) Newark, New Jersey
- Resting place: Fairmount Cemetery, Newark
- Party: Republican

Henry Meade Doremus (May 23, 1851 – January 16, 1921) was an American general contractor and Republican Party politician who was the mayor of Newark, New Jersey from 1903 to 1907. He also represented Newark for one term in the New Jersey General Assembly and served as sheriff of Essex County for one term.

== Early life ==
Henry Meade Doremus was born on May 23, 1851 in Jacksonville, Morris County, New Jersey to Peter G. and Susannah Doremus on a 700-acre homestead. He was a direct descendant of Cornelius Doremus, a Bergen County farmer on whose land the city of Paterson was constructed.

As a young man, Doremus walked many miles to school.

== Business career ==
At the age of seventeen, he was apprenticed to a carpenter in the city of Newark, and he later went into business for himself in construction and building.

Later in life, he served as a treasurer and director of Franklin Savings Institution and Fidelity Trust Company in Newark and was a member of the Newark Board of Trade. In the latter role, he served on a committee to investigate the Morris Canal Company for abandoning its Newark waterway; its report was influential on waterway issues in the state.

== Political career ==
Beginning in the 1870s, Doremus served on the Essex County Republican committee, and he continued in that position for forty years. During his early involvement in politics, he ran for Essex County sheriff as a sacrificial lamb.

In 1885, he served in the New Jersey General Assembly, representing the 8th and 11th wards of Newark. As an assemblyman, Doremus demonstrated special interest in the treatment of American Civil War veterans, and he was the chief sponsor of an act to establish a soldiers' home at Kearny, for which he was honored by the Grand Army of the Republic. In 1888, he was actively involved in the presidential campaign of Benjamin Harrison.

In 1896, Doremus ran for Essex County sheriff again. However, Republican prospects in the county were markedly improved by the realigning effect of the 1896 presidential election, and he was easily elected. He served until 1899.

In 1902, Republicans drafted Doremus as a candidate for mayor of Newark. He won two terms in office.

He was a New Jersey delegate to the Republican National Conventions of 1904, 1916, and 1920.

== Personal life and death ==
Doremus married Phoebe Baldwin in Newark on September 22, 1875. They lived on Mount Prospect Avenue in Newark and had five children:

- Nelson B. Doremus (June 13, 1875–September 6, 1899);
- Mary S. Doremus (born October 6, 1880), who married Hugh M. Hart;
- Munson G. Doremus (born September 1, 1882), who married Bessie Ward;
- Julie Doremus (born December 12, 1887), who married Chester W. Fairlie; and
- Gertrude Doremus (born November 4, 1892), who married Edward H. Eisele.

Doremus was a freemason and connected with the Royal Arch Masons, the Knights Templar, and the Shriners.

He died on January 16, 1921 and is buried at Fairmount Cemetery, Newark.
