= Attorney General Woodruff =

Attorney General Woodruff may refer to:

- Aaron Woodruff (1762–1817), Attorney General of New Jersey
- George Washington Woodruff (1864–1934), Attorney General of Pennsylvania

== See also ==
- General Woodruff (disambiguation)
