= Stephen Dod =

American politician

Stephen Dodd

6th Mayor of Newark
- In office 1844–1845
- Preceded by: William Wright
- Succeeded by: Isaac Baldwin

Personal details
- Born: March 7, 1770; Mendham Township, New Jersey
- Died: March 22, 1855 (aged 85); Newark, New Jersey
- Political party: Whig

Stephen Dodd (March 7, 1770 – March 22, 1855) was an American politician who served as the Mayor of Newark from 1844 to 1845.
