= William Halsey (mayor) =

First mayor of Newark, New Jersey

1st Mayor of Newark, New Jersey
- In office 1836–1837
- Preceded by: None
- Succeeded by: Theodore Frelinghuysen

Personal details
- Born: 1770 Short Hills, New Jersey
- Died: August 16, 1843 (aged 72–73)

William Halsey (1770 – August 16, 1843) was the first Mayor of Newark, New Jersey serving from 1836 to 1837. He was 66 years of age and an attorney when elected. Halsey Street in downtown Newark is named after him. He also served as director of the Newark Aqueduct Company.
