= John White Howell =

John W. Howell
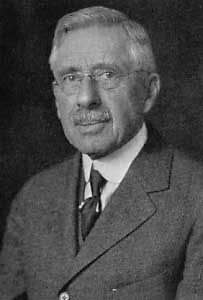
- John W. Howell, 1930

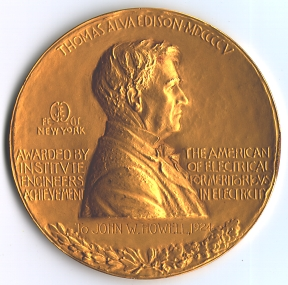
- Awards: IEEE Edison Medal (1924) Scanned image of 1924 Edison Medal awarded to John W. Howell

John White Howell (December 22, 1857 – July 28, 1937) was an American electrical engineer who spent his entire professional career (1880 to 1930) working for Thomas Edison, specializing in the development and manufacturing of the incandescent lamp.

In 1924 Howell was a recipient of the IEEE Edison Medal for his contributions towards the development of the incandescent lamp. Howell later co-authored the book History of the Incandescent Lamp, the authoritative source for the identification and description of Edison lamps.

== Biography ==
John W. Howell, was born at New Brunswick, New Jersey, December 22, 1857, son of Martin Armstrong and Abigail Lucetta (Stout) Howell. His earliest paternal American ancestor was Edward Howell, who came to America from Marsh Gibbon, England, Prior to 1639, received a land grant of 500 acres at Lynn, Massachusetts, and was a founder of Southampton, Long Island, New York, in 1640.

From Edward and his wife Frances, the line of descent was through Richard and Elizabeth (Halsey) Howell; Stephen and Mary (Stout) Howell, and Martin Armstrong and Jane (White) Howell, the grandparents of John White Howell. His grandfather Howell was a ship-owner and railway official and his father was an inventor of note and manufacture.

Howell was educated at the College of the City of New York from 1874 to 1876, Rutgers University from 1876 to 1878 and the Stevens Institute of Technology from 1878 to 1881. In his last year at Stevens, he wrote a thesis on “Economy of Electric Lighting by Incandescence,” giving original and accurate data on the efficiency of dynamos and lamps, carrying capacity of conductors, drops in house wiring, and allied subjects. Published in booklet form under the title of “Incandescent Electric Lights,” in 1882, it was at once translated into several languages.

As a result of this paper, Howell entered the employ of Thomas Edison at the then recently established Edison Works at Menlo Park, New Jersey, in the engineering department in July 1881, being first engaged in the preparation of equipment for the photometric measurement and testing of incandescent lamps and developing methods and procedure for their manufacture on a commercial scale.

In 1890 Howell provided key technical evidence in one of the most important of Edison's many patent infringement trials; the trial of Edison Electric Light Co. vs. US Electric Lighting Co., sometimes referred to as "the great carbon filament suit" or "the great filament suit". The latter company was being sued by Edison for infringing on Edison's high resistance carbon filament patent. As part of their defense, lawyers for US Electric Lighting Co. contended that Edison's patent was invalid because they claimed the circa 1879 hand-made lamps described in the original 1880 patent could not be reproduced using materials and methods described in the patent. In response, two of Edison's lab technicians tried and failed in their attempts to hand-make the lamps for the court.

Howell succeeded in making thirty to forty working "tar putty" carbon filament lamps, replicas of Edison's original breakthrough lamp design, as described in Edison's fundamental patent. In rendering his decision in favor of Edison's patent, the judge on the case said that Howell's testimony had completely refuted the claims that the patent did not give sufficient information to enable a man skilled in the art to make the lamps.

Edison showcased his victory in this famous trial at the 1893 World's Fair in Chicago. There, inside one of the many lamp cases on display at the Edison exhibit of the General Electric Company were displayed two of the "tar putty" carbon filament lamps made by Howell for the 1890 trial, as well as the tools used by Howell to make said lamps.

Seven of Howell's hand-made 1890 patent trial "tar putty" lamps survive today in a collection of rare, historic lamps discovered in 2004.

In 1893 Howell was appointed chief engineer of the Edison Lamp Works of the General Electric Company, which had taken over the Edison lamp works, holding that position until his retirement in 1931. From 1900 until his death he was a member of the advisory council of the research laboratory of the General Electric Company at Schenectady, New York.

Soon after taking up his work in the Edison laboratories at Menlo Park, Howell invented the first reliable electric current pressure indicator, known as the Howell voltmeter, which was the standard for central station switchboards until the development of the Weston voltmeter in 1890.

Besides inventing this pioneer electric current measuring device he improved existing devices and originated much new apparatus used in the manufacture of electric lamps, and left a permanent impress on the art of electric lighting in many directions.

Through the years he was intimately associated with inventions which increased lamp manufacturing from an initial rate of 35,000 lamps a year to 3,000 lamps a minute.

In 1885, as a result of exhaustive tests of lamp life, he determined the relative lives of lamps at different initial candle powers, obtaining an exponent of efficiency which was the subject of an important paper read before the American Institute of Electrical Engineers in 1888. He also invented an automatic machine for treating the carbon filament which eliminated the grave fire hazards of former process and which for many years was used in electric lamp manufacture, both in this country and in Europe; a four-head vertical sealing-in machine (1896) which was the first modern glass working machines used in the electric lamp industry; and, in collaboration with William Russell Burrows, a stem making machine (1901) which superseded the hand method of making electric lamp stems. In all, some fifty patents were granted him.

Besides making valuable original contributions to the literature of his profession, Howell assisted, by his discussion of the papers of others, in developing many important themes relative to method of electrical distribution, photometric standards and allied subjects, and he was co-author, with Henry Schroeder, of the “History of the Incandescent Lamp” (1927).

In recognition of his contributions to the development of the incandescent lamp, he was awarded the Edison Medal by the American Institute of Electrical Engineers in 1924, the citation stating: “In the evolution and development of that lamp he has rendered invaluable service. For forty-three years he has carried on an enormous amount of research work which has given the incandescent lamp its present universal usefulness. As the lighting branch was for many years the foundation, the parent, of the light and power industry, as we know it today, it is certain that Mr. Howell has played a most important and distinguished part in the scientific progress of his day.”

In 1930 Howell published his memoirs Stories for my Children.

Howell was given an honorary E.E. degree by Stevens Institute of Technology in 1899 and an honorary Sc.D. degree by Rutgers University in 1925 and Stevens Institute of Technology in 1932.

He was a member of the board of managers of the Howard Savings Institution of Newark, New Jersey; a trustee of the Newark (New Jersey) Museum Association, and the Marcus L. Ward Home, at Maplewood, New Jersey; a fellow of the American Institute of Electrical Engineers and the American Association for the Advancement of Science, and a member of the Illuminating Engineering Society, Franklin Institute, International Electro-Technical Commission, American Society of Mechanical Engineers, Edison Pioneers (president, 1923–1924), Theta Xi, the Essex and Essex County Country clubs of Newark, Adirondack League Club of Herkimer County, New York, Maidstone Club at Easthampton, Long Island, New York, and the Mid-Pines Country Club of Knollwood, North Carolina.

== Personal life and death ==
Howell was an Episcopalian in religion and for many years was a vestryman of Grace Church in Newark. Politically he was an independent.

He was married twice; first in Newark, New Jersey on January 25, 1889, to Mary Cortlandt, daughter of Edward Cortlandt Drake, a merchant, of that place. She died in 1890. On April 23, 1895, in Newark, New Jersey, he married Frederica Burckle, daughter of Robert Gilchrist, lawyer and attorney general of New Jersey. By the second marriage he had five children; Frederica Burckle, wife of Albert Blake Williams; John White; Jane Augusta Appleton, wife of Elijah Parish Lovejoy; Cornelia Margaret, wife of Nathan Comfort Starr, and Robert Gilchrist Howell.

Howell’s death occurred in New York City on July 28, 1937.

Source: The National Cyclopedia of American Biography, 1939

== Patents (partial list) ==
Electrical Indicator, US Pat. 339058 - Filed Dec 24, 1885 - Issued Mar 30, 1886 - THE EDISON LAMP COMPANY

System of Electrical Distribution, US Pat. 352691 - Filed Apr 15, 1886 - Issued Nov 16, 1886

Exhausting Lamps, US Pat. 726293 - Filed Nov 9, 1897 - Issued Apr 28, 1903 - THE GENERAL ELECTRIC COMPANY

Producing High Vacuums, US Pat. 660816 - Filed Aug 31, 1899 - Issued Oct 30, 1900 - THE GENERAL ELECTRIC COMPANY

Cut-Out, US Pat. 717201 - Filed Feb 2, 1901 - Issued Dec 30, 1902 - GENERAL ELECTRIC COMPANY

Incandescent Lamp, US Pat. 669306 - Issued Mar 5, 1901 - THE GENERAL ELECTRIC COMPANY

Device for Cleaning Filaments, US Pat. 744076 - Filed May 19, 1902 - Issued Nov 17, 1903 - GENERAL ELECTRIC COMPANY

Tube Coating Machine, US Pat. 755777 - Filed Jun 25, 1903 - Issued Mar 29, 1904 - GENERAL ELECTRIC COMPANY

Machine for Treating Filaments, US Pat. 1010914 - Filed Oct 17, 1903 - Issued Dec 5, 1911 - GENERAL ELECTRIC COMPANY

Photometric Apparatus, US Pat. 756963 - Filed Oct 17, 1903 - Issued Apr 12, 1904 - GENERAL ELECTRIC COMPANY

Machine for Making Stems for Incandescent Lamps, US Pat. 860977 - Filed Sep 19, 1903 - Issued Jul 23, 1907 - GENERAL ELECTRIC COMPANY

Filament Support, US Pat. 1024898 - Filed Dec 17, 1906 - Issued Apr 30, 1912 - GENERAL ELECTRIC COMPANY

Incandescent Lamp, US Pat. 904482 - Filed Oct 23, 1907 - Issued Nov 17, 1908 - GENERAL ELECTRIC COMPANY

Forming Machine for Tungsten Filaments, US Pat. 1062281 - Filed May 7, 1908 - Issued May 20, 1913 - GENERAL ELECTRIC COMPANY

Method of Manufacturing Filaments for Incandescent Lamps, US Pat. 955461 - Filed Aug 18, 1904 - Issued Apr 19, 1910 - GENERAL ELECTRIC COMPANY

Method of Fusing Lamp Filaments to Leading In Wires, US Pat. 1022553 - Issued Apr 9, 1912
