= Charles L. C. Gifford =

American attorney and politician

Member of the New Jersey Senate from Essex County
- In office 1858–1861
- Preceded by: George R. Chetwood
- Succeeded by: James Quinby

Personal details
- Born: November 1825 Newark, New Jersey, U.S.
- Died: March 29, 1877 (aged 51) Newark, New Jersey, U.S.
- Party: Democratic

Charles Louis Cammann Gifford (November 1825 – March 29, 1877) was an American attorney and politician who served in the New Jersey General Assembly and the New Jersey Senate. Gifford was President of the Senate in 1860.

Born in Newark, New Jersey, Gifford was the oldest son of Archer and Louisa (Cammann) Gifford. He graduated from Yale Law School in 1845, and was admitted to the bar as an attorney in 1847, and as a counselor in 1850. He served as Deputy Collector for the Port of Newark. Gifford was elected to the General Assembly in 1857, and the State Senate from 1858 to 1860. He was unanimously elected as President of the Senate for the 1860 term.

He was a nominee for Mayor of Newark in 1861, but lost to incumbent Moses Bigelow. He was appointed as Presiding Judge for the Court of Common Pleas of Essex County in June 1872 to complete an unexpired term.

Gifford died in his home in Newark on March 29, 1877.

Political offices
Preceded by Thomas H. Herring	President of the New Jersey Senate; 1860	Succeeded by Edmund Perry
