= Jerome T. Congleton =

American politician (1876–1936)

30th Mayor of Newark
- In office 1928–1933
- Preceded by: Thomas Lynch Raymond
- Succeeded by: Meyer C. Ellenstein

Personal details
- Born: August 25, 1876 Newark, New Jersey
- Died: December 10, 1936 (aged 60) Newark, New Jersey
- Party: Republican

Jerome Taylor Congleton (August 25, 1876 – December 10, 1936) served as Mayor of Newark, New Jersey from 1928 to 1933.

== Biography ==
He was born in Newark, New Jersey on August 25, 1876, the son of Joseph Norton Congleton and the former Mary Isabel Wade.

Congleton was elected as Mayor of Newark in 1928. In a wave of anti-incumbent backlash, he lost re-election.

On December 10, 1936, Congleton suffered a heart attack while driving his car and died. He was 60 years old.

Political offices
Preceded by Thomas Lynch Raymond	Mayor of Newark; 1928–1933	Succeeded by Meyer C. Ellenstein
