= Beach Vanderpool =

American politician

8th Mayor of Newark
- In office 1846–1848
- Preceded by: Isaac Baldwin
- Succeeded by: James Miller

Personal details
- Born: October 25, 1808 New Jersey
- Died: March 12, 1884 (aged 75) Newark, New Jersey
- Party: Whig

Beach Vanderpool (October 25, 1808 – March 12, 1884) was an American politician who served as the Mayor of Newark from 1846 to 1848.

== Biography ==
Vanderpool was a member of a prominent family in Newark. He was one of the founders of the Morris and Essex Railroad and was a major shareholder at the time of his death. He was also the president of the Howard Savings Bank and Commissioner of the Morris Plains Lunatic Asylum. One of his sons, Eugene Vanderpool (1844–1903), was president of the Newark Gas Light Company.
