= Samuel A. Ward =

American organist and composer

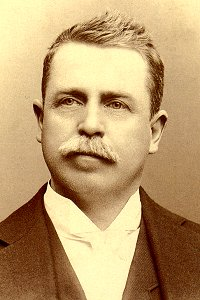
Samuel Augustus Ward

Samuel Augustus Ward (December 28, 1848 – September 28, 1903) was an American organist and composer. Born in Newark, New Jersey, the son of a shoemaker, he studied under several teachers in New York and became an organist at Grace Episcopal Church in his home town in 1880. He married Virginia Ward in 1871, with whom he had four daughters.

He is remembered for the 1882 tune "Materna", which he intended as a setting for the hymn "O Mother Dear, Jerusalem". This was published ten years later, in 1892. In 1903, after Ward had died, the tune was first combined by a publisher with the Katharine Lee Bates poem "America", itself first published in 1895, to create the patriotic song "America the Beautiful." The first book with the combination was published in 1910. Ward never met Bates.

Ward was founder and first director of the Orpheus Club of Newark, where he died on September 28, 1903. He is buried in Newark‘s Mount Pleasant Cemetery. Ward was inducted into the Songwriters Hall of Fame in 1970.
