= General Woodruff =

General Woodruff may refer to:

- Carle Augustus Woodruff (1841–1913), U.S. Army brigadier general
- Charles Woodruff (general) (1845–1920), U.S. Army brigadier general
- Roscoe B. Woodruff (1891–1975), U.S. Army major general

== See also ==
- Attorney General Woodruff (disambiguation)
