= Frederick C. Breidenbach =

American politician (1876–1955)

28th Mayor of Newark
- In office 1922–1925
- Preceded by: Alexander Archibald
- Succeeded by: Thomas Lynch Raymond

Personal details
- Born: September 21, 1876 Newark, New Jersey
- Died: May 21, 1955 (aged 78) Newark, New Jersey
- Party: Republican

Frederic Charles Breidenbach (September 21, 1876 – May 21, 1955) served as Mayor of Newark, New Jersey from 1922 to 1925.

== Biography ==
He was born in Newark, New Jersey in 1875. He served as Mayor of Newark, New Jersey from 1922 to 1925.

He died on Saturday, May 21, 1955, at the age of 78 at the Martland Medical Center in Newark, New Jersey.

Political offices
Preceded by Alexander Archibald	Mayor of Newark; 1922–1925	Succeeded by Thomas Lynch Raymond
