= America the Beautiful =

American patriotic song

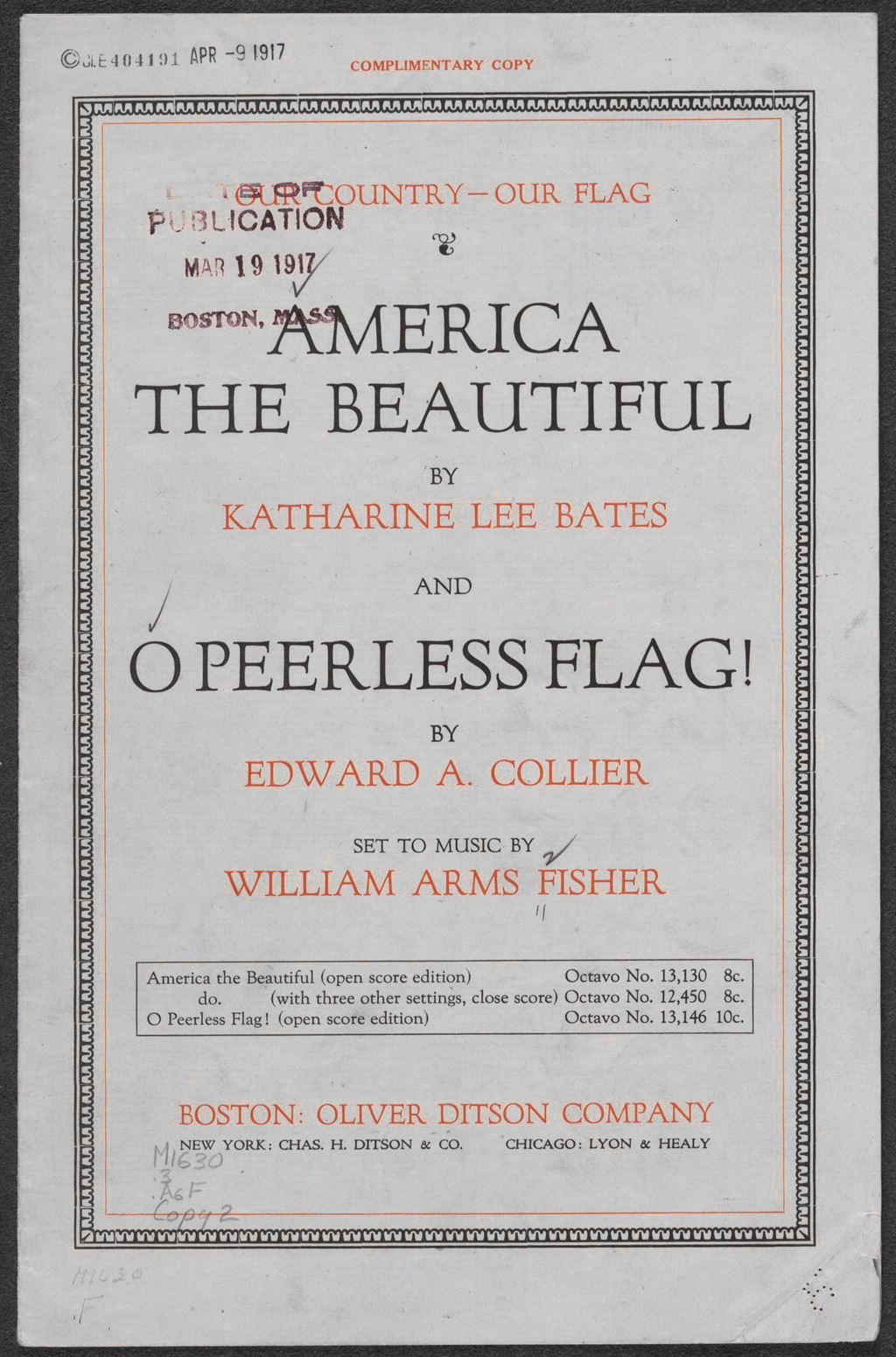
- Patriotic song of the United States
- Also known as: "Pikes Peak" (lyrics) "Materna" (music)
- Lyrics: Katharine Lee Bates, 1895
- Music: Samuel A. Ward, 1883
- Published: 1910 by Oliver Ditson & Co.

Audio sample
- "America the Beautiful" as performed by the United States Navy Band: file; help

"America the Beautiful" is an American patriotic song. Its lyrics were written by Katharine Lee Bates and its music was composed by church organist and choirmaster Samuel A. Ward at Grace Episcopal Church in Newark, New Jersey, though the two never met.

Bates wrote the words as a poem, originally titled "Pikes Peak". It was first published in the Fourth of July 1895 edition of the church periodical, The Congregationalist. At that time, the poem was titled "America".

Ward had initially composed the song's melody in 1882 to accompany lyrics to "Materna", basis of the hymn, "O Mother dear, Jerusalem", though the hymn was not first published until 1892. The combination of Ward's melody and Bates's poem was first entitled "America the Beautiful" in 1910. The song is one of the most popular of the many American patriotic songs.

== History ==
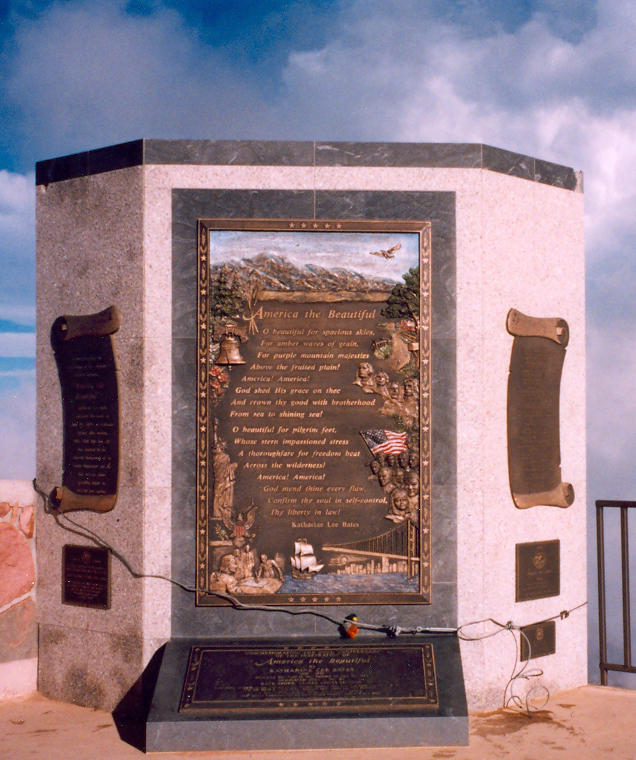
Commemoration plaque atop Pikes Peak in July 1999

In 1893, at the age of 33, Bates, an English professor at Wellesley College, had taken a train trip to Colorado Springs, Colorado, to teach at Colorado College. Several of the sights on her trip inspired her, and they found their way into her poem, including the World's Columbian Exposition in Chicago, the "White City" with its promise of the future contained within its gleaming white buildings; the wheat fields of North America's heartland Kansas, through which her train was riding on July 16; and the majestic view of the Great Plains from high atop Pikes Peak.

On the pinnacle of that mountain, the words of the poem started to come to her, and she wrote them down upon returning to her hotel room at the original Antlers Hotel. The poem was initially published two years later in The Congregationalist to commemorate the Fourth of July. It quickly caught the public's fancy. An amended version was published in 1904.

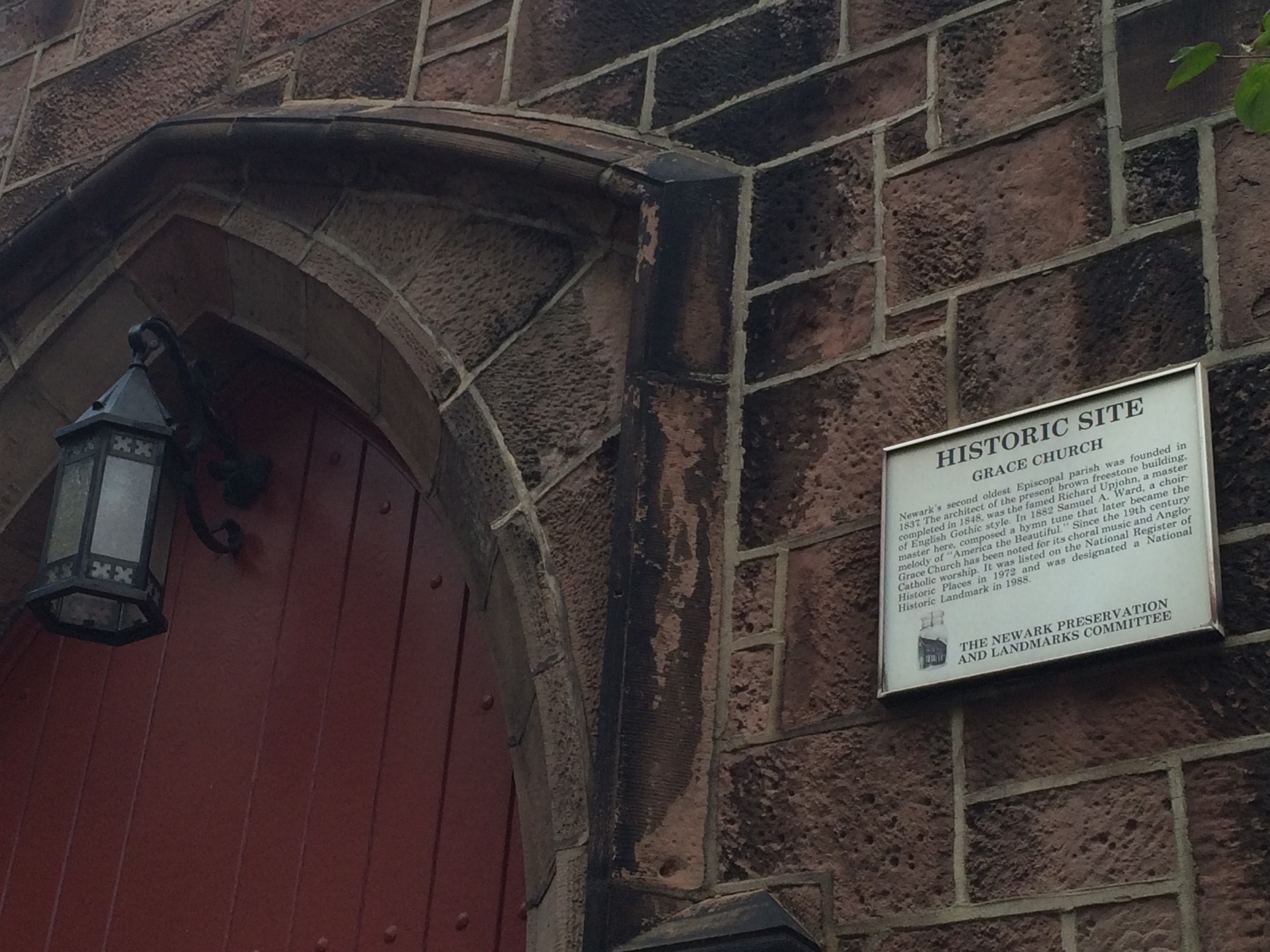
Historical marker at Grace Church in Newark where Samuel Ward worked as organist, and wrote and perfected the tune "Materna" that is used for "America the Beautiful"

"America the Beautiful"
"America the Beautiful", as performed by the United States Navy Band

"America the Beautiful"
United States Army Band Brass version

"America the Beautiful"
c.1953 performance by the United States Marine Band

"America the Beautiful"
Performed by the Second Marine Aircraft Wing Band of Cherry Point, North Carolina.

The first known melody written for the song was sent in by Silas Pratt when the poem was published in The Congregationalist. By 1900, at least 75 different melodies had been written. A hymn tune composed in 1882 by Samuel A. Ward, the organist and choir director at Grace Church, Newark, was generally considered the best music as early as 1910 and is still the popular tune today. Just as Bates had been inspired to write her poem, Ward, too, was inspired. The tune came to him while he was on a ferryboat trip from Coney Island back to his home in New York City after a leisurely summer day and he immediately wrote it down. He composed the tune for the old hymn "O Mother Dear, Jerusalem", retitling the work "Materna". Ward's music combined with Bates's poem were first published together in 1910 and titled "America the Beautiful".

Ward died in 1903, not knowing the national stature his music would attain. The song's popularity was well established by the time of Bates's death in 1929. It is included in songbooks in many religious congregations in the United States.

At various times in the more than one hundred years that have elapsed since the song was written, particularly during the John F. Kennedy administration, there have been efforts to give "America the Beautiful" legal status either as a national hymn or as a national anthem equal to, or in place of, "The Star-Spangled Banner", but so far this has not succeeded. Proponents prefer "America the Beautiful" for various reasons, saying it is easier to sing, more melodic, and more adaptable to new orchestrations while still remaining as easily recognizable as "The Star-Spangled Banner". Some object to the war-oriented imagery of "The Star-Spangled Banner", as well as its implicit support of slavery and racism in the third verse. Some who prefer "The Star-Spangled Banner", however, prefer it specifically for its war themes. While that national dichotomy has stymied any effort at changing the tradition of the national anthem, "America the Beautiful" continues to be held in high esteem by a large number of Americans, and was even being considered before 1931 as a candidate to become the national anthem of the United States.

== Lyrics ==
America. A Poem for July 4.

1893 poem (original)

O beautiful for halcyon skies,
For amber waves of grain,
For purple mountain majesties
Above the enameled plain!
America! America!
God shed his grace on thee
Till souls wax fair as earth and air
And music-hearted sea!

O beautiful for pilgrim feet,
Whose stern, impassioned stress
A thoroughfare for freedom beat
Across the wilderness!
America! America!
God shed his grace on thee
Till paths be wrought through wilds of thought
By pilgrim foot and knee!

O beautiful for glory-tale
Of liberating strife,
When once and twice, for man's avail,
Men lavished precious life!
America! America!
God shed his grace on thee
Till selfish gain no longer stain
The banner of the free!

O beautiful for patriot dream
That sees beyond the years
Thine alabaster cities gleam
Undimmed by human tears!
America! America!
God shed his grace on thee,
Till nobler men keep once again
Thy whiter jubilee!

1904 version

O beautiful for spacious skies,
For amber waves of grain,
For purple mountain majesties
Above the fruited plain!

O beautiful for pilgrim feet
Whose stern impassioned stress
A thoroughfare for freedom beat
Across the wilderness.
America! America!
God mend thine ev'ry flaw,
Confirm thy soul in self-control,
Thy liberty in law.

O beautiful for glory-tale
Of liberating strife,
When valiantly for man's avail
Men lavished precious life.
America! America!
May God thy gold refine
Till all success be nobleness,
And every gain divine.

O beautiful for patriot dream
That sees beyond the years
Thine alabaster cities gleam
Undimmed by human tears.
America! America!
God shed His grace on thee,
And crown thy good with brotherhood
From sea to shining sea.

1911 version

O beautiful for spacious skies,
For amber waves of grain,
For purple mountain majesties
Above the fruited plain!
America! America!
God shed His grace on thee
And crown thy good with brotherhood
From sea to shining sea!

O beautiful for pilgrim feet,
Whose stern, impassioned stress
A thoroughfare for freedom beat
Across the wilderness!
America! America!
God mend thine every flaw,
Confirm thy soul in self-control,
Thy liberty in law!

O beautiful for heroes proved
In liberating strife,
Who more than self their country loved
And mercy more than life!
America! America!
May God thy gold refine,
Till all success be nobleness,
And every gain divine!

O beautiful for patriot dream
That sees beyond the years
Thine alabaster cities gleam
Undimmed by human tears!
America! America!
God shed His grace on thee
And crown thy good with brotherhood
From sea to shining sea!

== Notable performances ==
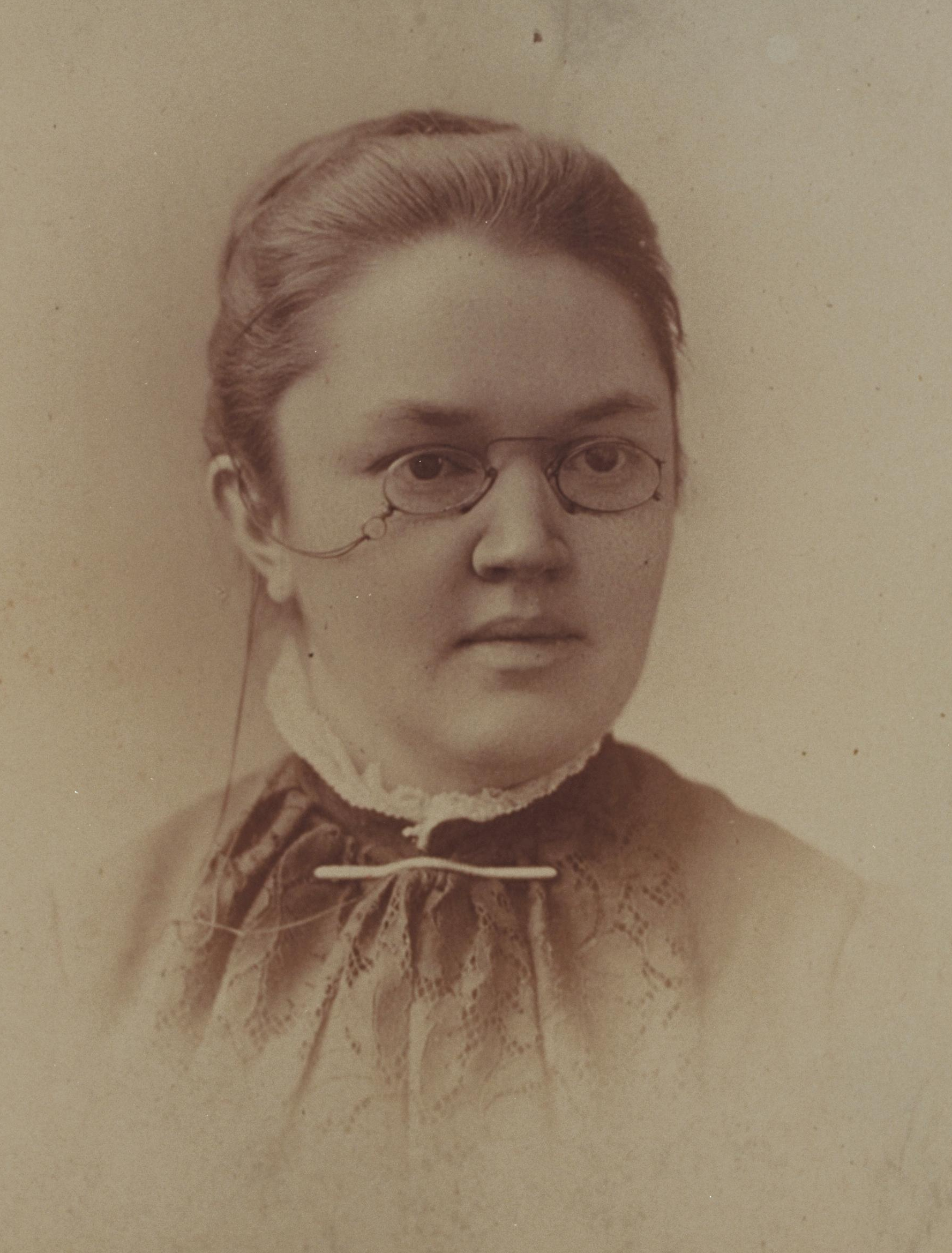
Katharine Lee Bates, ca. 1880–1890

Bing Crosby included the song in a medley on his album 101 Gang Songs (1961).

Frank Sinatra recorded the song with Nelson Riddle during the sessions for The Concert Sinatra in February 1963, for a projected 45 single release. The 45 was not commercially issued however, but the song was later added as a bonus track to the enhanced 2012 CD release of The Concert Sinatra.

In 1976, while the United States celebrated its bicentennial, a soulful version popularized by Ray Charles peaked at number 98 on the US R&B chart. (Note: Ray Charles' 1972 recording of this song was inducted into the Grammy Hall of Fame in 2005.) His version has traditionally been played on New Year's Eve following the Times Square Ball drop. Charles performed the song at the 1984 Republican National Convention and Super Bowl XXXV in January 2001. In June 2026, CBS News included the Charles rendition in its list of the 250 essential American songs of the past 250 years.

Three different renditions of the song have entered the Hot Country Songs charts. The first was by Charlie Rich, which went to number 22 in 1976. A second, by Mickey Newbury, peaked at number 82 in 1980. An all-star version of "America the Beautiful" performed by country singers Trace Adkins, Sherrié Austin, Billy Dean, Vince Gill, Carolyn Dawn Johnson, Toby Keith, Brenda Lee, Lonestar, Lyle Lovett, Lila McCann, Lorrie Morgan, Jamie O'Neal, The Oak Ridge Boys, Collin Raye, Kenny Rogers, Keith Urban and Phil Vassar reached number 58 in July 2001. The song re-entered the chart following the September 11 attacks. Elvis Presley added the song to his live shows for a time during the Bicentennial year of 1976. He first recorded it live December 13, 1975. It was released as a B-side to "My Way" in November, 1977.

Barbra Streisand released an official music video footage during Norman Lear's Special in 1982.

The song has been sung before many editions of the WWE's flagship annual show WrestleMania beginning at WrestleMania 2 in 1986, interchangeably with The Star-Spangled Banner. The song has been performed by artists such as Ray Charles, Aretha Franklin, Gladys Knight, Willie Nelson, Little Richard, Boyz II Men, Boys Choir of Harlem, John Legend, Nicole Scherzinger and Fifth Harmony.

During her rise to stardom, R&B singer Mariah Carey sang the song at the 1990 NBA Finals.

Whitney Houston also recorded the song, covering Ray Charles' soulful rearranged version as the B-side to her 1991 rendition of "The Star Spangled Banner."

The song has been performed as part of the Indianapolis 500 pre-race ceremonies since 1991.

The US singer/songwriter Martin Sexton recorded a gospel-tinged version on his LP "Black Sheep," released in 1996.

Popularity of the song increased greatly in the decades following 9/11; at some sporting events it was sung in addition to the traditional singing of the national anthem. During the first taping of the Late Show with David Letterman following the attacks, CBS newsman Dan Rather cried briefly as he quoted the fourth verse.

American heavy metal band Black Label Society released an instrumental cover on their 2002 album 1919 Eternal.

The hymn has been featured in the pregame for a number of Super Bowls, the championship game for each NFL season. It is sung before the "Star-Spangled Banner" and after the hymn "Lift Every Voice and Sing," commonly referred to as the "Black national anthem". For Super Bowl XLVIII, The Coca-Cola Company aired a multilingual version of the song, sung in several different languages. The commercial received some criticism on social media sites, such as Twitter and Facebook, and from some conservatives, such as Glenn Beck. Despite the controversies, Coca-Cola later reused the Super Bowl ad during Super Bowl LI, the opening ceremonies of the 2014 Winter Olympics and 2016 Summer Olympics and for patriotic holidays. Notable performers at the Super Bowl include Ray Charles, Alicia Keys, John Legend, Jhené Aiko, Faith Hill, Mary J. Blige with Marc Anthony, Blake Shelton with Miranda Lambert, Queen Latifah, Leslie Odom Jr., and Babyface. Post Malone performed the song for the most recent game, Super Bowl LVIII, in 2024.

The song, performed by 5 Alarm Music, is featured heavily in a dystopian action horror franchise The Purge in both trailers and films.

In 2016, American five-piece girl group Fifth Harmony performed a rendition to honor the United States women's national soccer team on defeating Japan 5–2 in the Final to win the 2015 FIFA Women's World Cup last July at BC Place in Vancouver, British Columbia, Canada before an undisputed AT&T Stadium audience of 101,763 to open WrestleMania 32 in Dallas, Texas.

In 2017, Jackie Evancho released Together We Stand, a disc containing three patriotic songs including "America the Beautiful." The song charted at No. 4 on Billboard's Classical Digital Song sales chart.

Two versions appear in the 2020 video game Wasteland 3. One being an abbreviated cover with the 1911 lyrics was performed by Greg Jong and was played when fighting the Gippers and God-President Reagan AI, and a choral version by the Fort Bend Boys Choir when fighting Angela Deth.

In 2021, Jennifer Lopez performed the song at the inauguration of Joe Biden, as the second half of a medley with "This Land Is Your Land" by Woody Guthrie.

In 2023, Cécile McLorin Salvant performed the song at the US Open woman's final. In her rendition, Salvant notably skipped ahead to the lyrics of the second half of the second verse while singing the first verse (replacing "God shed His grace on thee..." with "God mend thine every flaw...", etc.). Jazz Critic Nate Chinen wrote the following day of the performance, "What does it mean for a singer such as Salvant to inhabit a platform like the US Open, and implore God to mend America’s every flaw? What does it mean, in the Year of Our Lord 2023, for a singer like Salvant to urge the nation to confirm thy soul in self-control, and find liberty in law? I’m not going to spell it out, but it means a lot."

In 2025, Carrie Underwood sang the song a capella after what were described as “technical difficulties” caused the failure of her backing music, during the second inauguration of Donald Trump.

== Idioms ==
"From sea to shining sea" is an American idiom meaning "from the Atlantic Ocean to the Pacific Ocean" (or vice versa). Other songs that have used this phrase include the American patriotic song "God Bless the U.S.A." and Schoolhouse Rock's "Elbow Room". The phrase and the song are also the namesake of the Shining Sea Bikeway, a bike path in Bates's hometown of Falmouth, Massachusetts. The phrase is similar to the Latin phrase "A Mari Usque Ad Mare" ("From sea to sea"), which is the official motto of Canada.

"Purple mountain majesties" refers to the shade of Pikes Peak in Colorado Springs, Colorado, which inspired Bates to write the poem. The idiom inspired the Colorado Rockies to have purple as one of its team colors.

In 2003, Tori Amos appropriated the phrase "for amber waves of grain" to create a personification for her song "Amber Waves". Amos imagines Amber Waves as an exotic dancer, like the character of the same name portrayed by Julianne Moore in Boogie Nights.

== Books ==
External videos
- Discussion with Sherr on America the Beautiful, November 27, 2001, C-SPAN

Lynn Sherr's 2001 book America the Beautiful: The Stirring True Story Behind Our Nation's Favorite Song discusses the origins of the song and the backgrounds of its authors in depth. The book points out that the poem has the same meter as that of "Auld Lang Syne"; the songs can be sung interchangeably. Additionally, Sherr discusses the evolution of the lyrics, for instance, changes to the original third verse written by Bates.

Melinda M. Ponder, in her 2017 biography Katharine Lee Bates: From Sea to Shining Sea, draws heavily on Bates's diaries and letters to trace the history of the poem and its place in American culture.

== See also ==
- "God Bless America"
