= Theodore Frelinghuysen =

American politician (1787–1862)

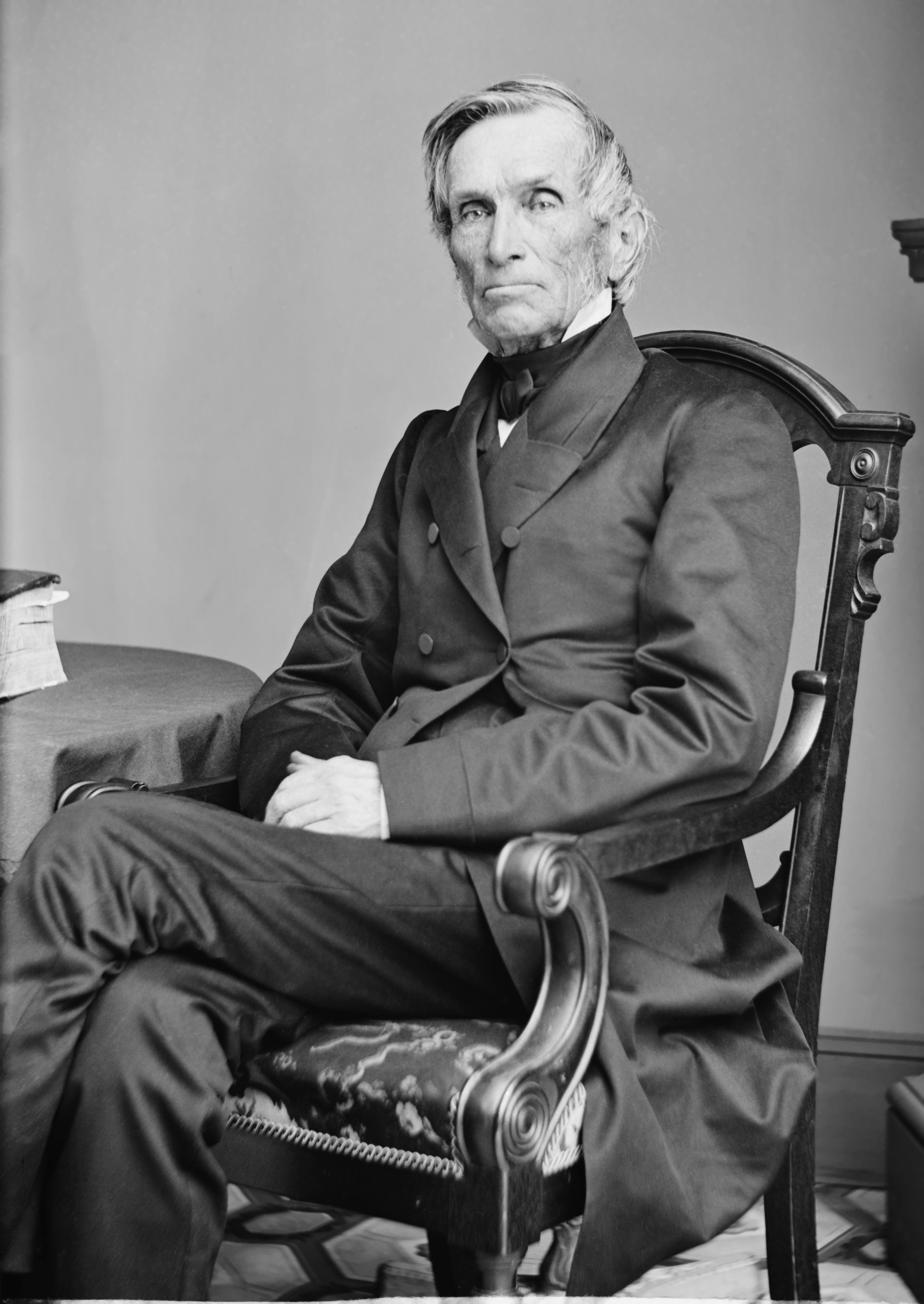
- Frelinghuysen, 1855–1862

7th President of Rutgers University
- In office 1850–1862
- Preceded by: Abraham Bruyn Hasbrouck
- Succeeded by: William Campbell

2nd Chancellor of New York University
- In office 1839–1850
- Preceded by: James M. Mathews
- Succeeded by: Isaac Ferris

2nd Mayor of Newark
- In office November 10, 1837 – November 10, 1838
- Preceded by: William Halsey
- Succeeded by: James Miller

United States Senator from New Jersey
- In office March 4, 1829 – March 3, 1835
- Preceded by: Mahlon Dickerson
- Succeeded by: Garret D. Wall

6th Attorney General of New Jersey
- In office November 1, 1817 – March 4, 1829
- Governor: Isaac Halstead Williamson
- Preceded by: Aaron Woodruff
- Succeeded by: Samuel L. Southard

Personal details
- Born: March 28, 1787 Franklin Township, New Jersey, U.S.
- Died: April 12, 1862 (aged 75) New Brunswick, New Jersey, U.S.
- Party: Federalist (Before 1829); National Republican (1829–1834); Whig (1834–1854)
- Spouses: Charlotte Mercer (m. 1809, died) Harriet Pumpelly (m. 1857–1862)
- Relatives: Frelinghuysen family Frederick Frelinghuysen (Father)
- Education: Princeton University (BA)

Theodore Frelinghuysen (March 28, 1787 – April 12, 1862) was an American politician and lawyer who represented New Jersey in the United States Senate from March 4, 1829, to March 3, 1835. He was the Whig vice presidential nominee in the election of 1844, running on a ticket with Senator Henry Clay of Kentucky.

Born in Somerset County, New Jersey, Frelinghuysen established a legal practice in Newark, New Jersey, after graduating from the College of New Jersey. He was the son of Senator Frederick Frelinghuysen and the adoptive father of Secretary of State Frederick Theodore Frelinghuysen. He served as the New Jersey Attorney General from 1817 to 1829 and as a United States Senator from 1829 to 1835. In the Senate, Frelinghuysen strongly opposed President Andrew Jackson's policy of Indian removal. After leaving the Senate, he served as the Mayor of Newark from 1837 to 1838.

Frelinghuysen was selected as Clay's running mate at the 1844 Whig National Convention. In the 1844 election, the Whig ticket was narrowly defeated by the Democratic ticket of James K. Polk and George M. Dallas. Frelinghuysen served as president of New York University from 1839 to 1850, and as president of Rutgers College from 1850 to 1862. Upon its incorporation in 1848, Frelinghuysen Township, New Jersey, was named after him.

== Early life ==
Theodore Frelinghuysen was born in 1787 in Franklin Township, Somerset County, New Jersey, to Frederick Frelinghuysen and Gertrude Schenck. Frelinghuysen's siblings included: Catharine Frelinghuysen; John Frelinghuysen (1776–1833) the General who married Louisa Mercer and after her death married Elizabeth Mercereau Van Vechten; Maria Frelinghuysen (1778–?); and Frederick Frelinghuysen (1788–1820) the lawyer who married Jane Dumont. His great-grandfather Theodorus Jacobus Frelinghuysen was a minister and theologian of the Dutch Reformed Church, influential in the founding of Queen's College, now Rutgers University, and one of four key leaders of the First Great Awakening in Colonial America. Theodore was the uncle of Frederick T. Frelinghuysen and great-great-grandfather of Henry Cabot Lodge Jr.

Rodney Frelinghuysen, who represented New Jersey's 11th congressional district, is a descendant.

Frelinghuysen married Charlotte Mercer in 1809, but she died in the same year. They had no children together, but when Theodore's brother, Frederick Frelinghuysen (1788–1820) died, Theodore adopted his son, Frederick Theodore Frelinghuysen (1817–1885), who would later become Secretary of State. Theodore Frelinghuysen remarried in 1857 to Harriet Pumpelly.

He graduated from the College of New Jersey (now Princeton University) in 1804 and studied law under his brother John Frelinghuysen, and later, Richard Stockton. He was admitted to the bar as an attorney in 1808 and as a counselor in 1811, and set up a law practice in Newark during this time period. In the War of 1812, he was a captain of a company of volunteers.

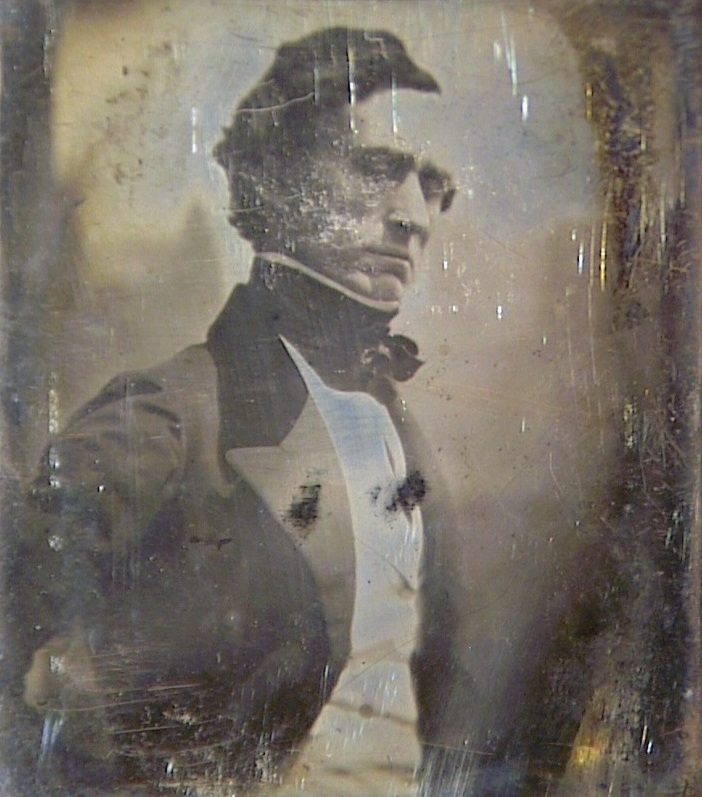
This early daguerreotype by John William Draper possibly depicts Frelinghuysen in 1839, making it one of the earliest known photographs of an American.

== Political career ==
He became Attorney General of New Jersey in 1817, turned down an appointment to the New Jersey Supreme Court and became a United States Senator in 1829, serving in that capacity until 1835.

As a Senator, he led the opposition to Andrew Jackson's Indian Removal Act of 1830. His six-hour speech against the Removal Act was delivered over the course of three days, and warned of the supposed dire consequences of the policy:

Let us beware how, by oppressive encroachments upon the sacred privileges of our Indian neighbors, we minister to the agonies of future remorse.

Jackson supporters chided Frelinghuysen for mixing his evangelical Christianity with politics, and the Removal Act was passed.^{1}

He was Mayor of Newark, New Jersey, from 1837 until 1838.

At the 1844 Whig National Convention, competing with Millard Fillmore, John Davis and John Sergeant, he was selected as the Whig vice-presidential candidate. He took the lead on the first ballot and never lost it, eventually being chosen by acclamation. The Whig presidential candidate, Henry Clay, was not present at the convention and expressed surprise upon hearing the news. Frelinghuysen's rectitude might have been intended to correct for Clay's reputation for moral laxity, but his opposition to Indian removal may have put off those southern voters who had suffered from their raids (William Lloyd Garrison praised his speech opposing removal in the poem "To the Honorable Theodore Freylinghusen, on reading his eloquent speech in defence of Indian Rights"). Frelinghuysen was also unpopular with Catholics because groups of which he was a member, such as the Protestant American Bible Society, promulgated the idea that Catholics should convert to Protestantism. Clay and Frelinghuysen lost the 1844 election.

== Institutional positions ==
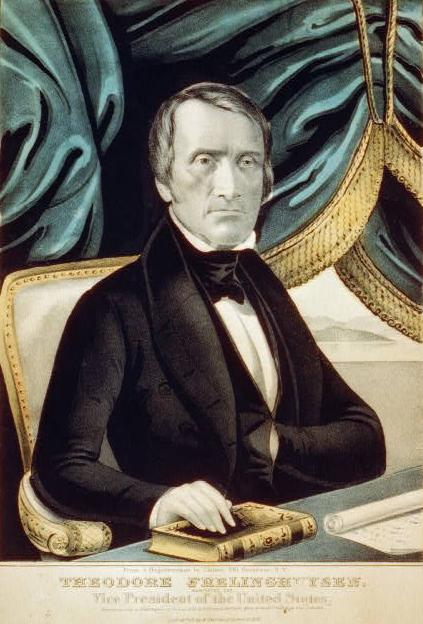
Theodore Frelinghuysen campaign poster

Frelinghuysen was the second president of New York University between 1839 and 1850 and seventh president of Rutgers College between 1850 and 1862. He was president of the American Board of Commissioners for Foreign Missions (1841 – c. 1857), American Bible Society (1846–1862), and American Tract Society (1842–1846), as well as vice president of the American Sunday School Union (1826–1861), and American Colonization Society (ACS). In his public advocacy for colonization, or the deportation of free people of color from the United States, Frelinguysen described black people as “licentious, ignorant, and irritated” and therefore not suited for full citizenship within their present country. His moniker was the "Christian Statesman."

== Death ==
He died in New Brunswick, New Jersey, on April 12, 1862, and he was buried there at the First Reformed Church Cemetery.

== Notes ==
- ^1 Anthony F.C. Wallace, The Long, Bitter Trail: Andrew Jackson and the Indians (New York: Hill and Wang, 1993), pp. 68–9, and Francis Paul Prucha, The Great Father: The United States Government and the American Indians, Volume I (Lincoln: University of Nebraska Press, 1984), pp. 204–5.

Legal offices
Preceded by Aaron Woodruff	Attorney General of New Jersey; 1817–1829	Succeeded by Samuel L. Southard
U.S. Senate
Preceded by Mahlon Dickerson	U.S. Senator (Class 2) from New Jersey; 1829–1835; Served alongside: Mahlon Dickerson, Samuel L. Southard	Succeeded by Garret D. Wall
Political offices
Preceded by John Tyler	Mayor of Newark; 1837–1838	Succeeded by James Miller
Academic offices
Preceded by James M. Mathews	Chancellor of New York University; 1839–1850	Succeeded by Isaac Ferris
Preceded by Abraham Bruyn Hasbrouck	President of Rutgers University; 1850–1862	Succeeded by William Campbell
Party political offices
Preceded by John Tyler	Whig nominee for Vice President of the United States; 1844	Succeeded by Millard Fillmore
