= James M. Quinby =

American politician

10th Mayor of Newark
- In office 1851–1854
- Preceded by: James Miller
- Succeeded by: Horace J. Poinier

Member of the New Jersey Senate from Essex County
- In office 1861–1864
- Preceded by: Charles L. C. Gifford
- Succeeded by: John G. Trusdell

Personal details
- Born: October 4, 1804 Orange, New Jersey
- Died: July 20, 1874 (aged 69) Newark, New Jersey
- Party: Whig; Republican

James M. Quinby (October 4, 1804 – July 20, 1874) was an American politician who served as the Mayor of Newark from 1851 to 1854.
