= James Miller (Newark politician) =

American politician

3rd and 9th Mayor of Newark
- In office 1838–1840
- Preceded by: Theodore Frelinghuysen
- Succeeded by: Oliver Spencer Halstead
- In office 1848–1851
- Preceded by: Beach Vanderpool
- Succeeded by: James M. Quinby

Personal details
- Political party: Whig

James Miller was an American politician who served as the Mayor of Newark from 1838 to 1840 and from 1848 to 1851.
