= Charles P. Gillen =

American politician (1876–1956)

Charles Patrick Gillen

26th Mayor of Newark
- In office January 1, 1917 – January 1, 1921
- Preceded by: Thomas Lynch Raymond
- Succeeded by: Alexander Archibald

Personal details
- Born: August 6, 1876 County Roscommon, Ireland
- Died: June 30, 1956 (aged 79) Newark, New Jersey
- Party: Democratic

Charles Patrick Gillen (August 6, 1876 – June 30, 1956) was the Democratic mayor of Newark, New Jersey, from 1917 to 1921. He was the first mayor under the reincorporation as a City Commission form of government.

== Biography ==
He was born in County Roscommon, Ireland on August 6, 1876. He was the son of Thomas Gillen and Mary A. Conry. He was Irish Catholic.

He married Margaret Carey in 1923. He had a real estate business before entering politics. He was the mayor of Newark, New Jersey, from 1917 to 1921. He was a delegate to the 1932 Democratic National Convention.

He died on June 30, 1956, at Saint Michael's Medical Center in Newark, New Jersey, aged 79 and was buried at Mount Olivet Cemetery, Newark.

== See also ==
- List of mayors of Newark, New Jersey

Preceded by Thomas Lynch Raymond	Mayor of Newark; 1917–1921	Succeeded by Alexander Archibald
