= Horace J. Poinier =

American politician

11th Mayor of Newark
- In office 1854–1857
- Preceded by: James M. Quinby
- Succeeded by: Moses Bigelow

Personal details
- Born: October 28, 1810; Newark, New Jersey
- Died: April 19, 1894 (aged 83); Newark, New Jersey
- Political party: Whig

Horace J. Poinier (October 28, 1810 – April 19, 1894) was an American politician who served as the Mayor of Newark from 1854 to 1857.
