= Isaac Baldwin =

American politician

7th Mayor of Newark
- In office 1845–1846
- Preceded by: Stephen Dod
- Succeeded by: Beach Vanderpool

Personal details
- Born: July 4, 1790
- Died: September 5, 1853 (aged 63)
- Political party: Whig

Isaac Baldwin (July 4, 1790 – September 5, 1853) was an American politician who served as the Mayor of Newark from 1845 to 1846.
