= Jacob Haussling =

American politician

24th Mayor of Newark
- In office 1907–1915
- Preceded by: Henry Meade Doremus
- Succeeded by: Thomas Lynch Raymond

Sheriff of Essex County, New Jersey
- In office 1893–1896
- Succeeded by: Henry Mead Doremus

Personal details
- Born: February 22, 1855 Newark, New Jersey
- Died: February 25, 1921 (aged 66) Newark, New Jersey
- Party: Democratic

Jacob Haussling (February 22, 1855 – February 25, 1921) was the four time Democratic Mayor of Newark, New Jersey. He killed himself on February 25, 1921.

== Biography ==
Haussling was born in Newark, to Henry Haussling, a Bavarian immigrant, and Josephine Freund. He attended St. Mary's Parochial School, the Second Ward Grammar School, and Stratton's Business College.

Haussling began his political career in 1888 with an unsuccessful bid to become Sheriff of Essex County, New Jersey. His second attempt in 1893 was successful, serving one term until being unseated by Republican Henry Meade Doremus in the following 1896 election. In 1906, Haussling was victorious over the Republicans partly due to his strong stance against the unpopular "Bishop's Law", which prohibited the operation of saloons on Sundays. Although he replaced Henry Doremus as Mayor, Doremus was not renominated and Haussling won over Republican nominee Walton S. Howarth.

Haussling was re-elected in 1908, 1910, and 1912, until being defeated by Thomas Lynch Raymond in 1914. By his wife's account, the defeat and fall from public favor was difficult on Haussling, who died from suicide nine years later at the age of 66. Scholar Dan O'Flaherty argues that his defeat was part of a total disappearance of Germans from Newark politics, caused by anti-German prejudice and a change in government structure.

Political offices
Preceded by Henry Meade Doremus	Mayor of Newark; 1906–1915	Succeeded by Thomas Lynch Raymond
