= Edmund Perry (politician) =

American politician

President of the New Jersey Senate
- In office 1861–1862
- Preceded by: Charles L. C. Gifford
- Succeeded by: Joseph T. Crowell

Personal details
- Born: October 4, 1825 Basking Ridge, New Jersey, U.S.
- Died: November 2, 1878 (aged 53)
- Party: Democratic

Edmund Perry (October 4, 1825 – November 2, 1878) was an American politician and newspaper publisher. He served as President of the New Jersey Senate from 1861 to 1862.

== Biography ==
Perry was born in the Basking Ridge section of Bernards Township, New Jersey in 1825, the sixth son of Samuel Perry. After studying law, he was admitted to the bar in 1848. He began a legal practice at New Hampton before moving to Flemington. In Flemington, he became editor and publisher of The Hunterdon County Democrat, a weekly newspaper. He gave up ownership and editorship of The Democrat in 1854.

In 1859, Perry was elected to the New Jersey Senate, representing Hunterdon County as a Democrat. At the beginning of the 1861 legislative session, the Republican Party held a one-seat advantage in the Senate, but after the defection of Burlington County senator Thomas L. Norcross, Democrats won control and Perry was named Senate President.

As Senate President, Perry officially received Abraham Lincoln when he passed through Trenton on February 21, 1861, en route to Washington, D.C. for his first inauguration. He introduced Lincoln with a short speech before Lincoln gave his remarks. When the Civil War began in April 1861, Perry expressed the state's support for the war effort: "Our duty is clear. New Jersey has never failed or faltered in her constitutional obligations; she will not do so now." Perry served as chairman of the Senate Judiciary Committee for two years. In 1866, he was appointed judge of the New Jersey Court of Common Pleas.

Perry married Elizabeth A. White and had two sons, Samuel Edmund Perry (1849–1914) and John Belmont Perry (1854–1912), both lawyers, and one daughter, Florence Elizabeth Perry (1861–1924). He died in 1878 at the age of 53 and was buried at Mount Pleasant Cemetery in Newark.

Political offices
Preceded by Charles L. C. Gifford	President of the New Jersey Senate; 1861–1862	Succeeded by Joseph T. Crowell
