= Julius A. Lebkuecher =

American politician (1844-1913)

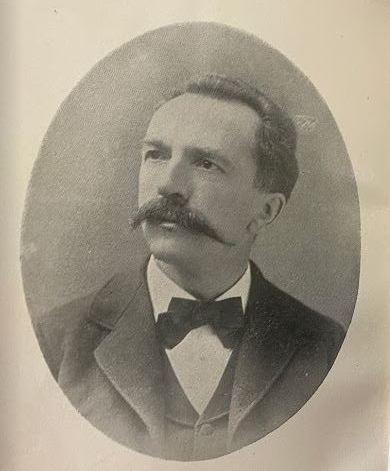

21st Mayor of Newark
- In office 1894–1896
- Preceded by: Joseph E. Haynes
- Succeeded by: James M. Seymour

Personal details
- Born: February 9, 1844 Baden, Germany
- Died: May 13, 1913 (aged 69) Newark, New Jersey
- Party: Republican

Julius A. Lebkuecher (February 9, 1844 – May 13, 1913) was an American politician who served as the Mayor of Newark from 1894 to 1896.

Julius was born in Germany in 1844. At age four he moved to Newark and was educated in the public schools of Newark through Barringer High School. He was a jeweler and helped found Kremetz and Company. In 1894, he accepted the Republican nomination for Mayor. He was elected by nearly 5,000 votes.

After his time as Mayor he continued working in jewelry and was president of the Passaic Valley Sewerage Commission from 1902 to 1913. He left a wife, Louise, and two sons.
