= James M. Mathews =

First Chancellor of New York University

1st Chancellor of New York University
- In office 1831–1839
- Succeeded by: Theodore Frelinghuysen

Rev. James M. Mathews was the first Chancellor of New York University (NYU).

In December 1829, a group formed as the "New York Athenaeum" led by Albert Gallatin and Rev. James Mathews, and including representatives of the clergy, the commercial occupations, law, and medicine, met at the home of Reverend Matthews. Backers of a new college also included several disaffected Columbia University trustees and faculty. This gathering resulted in the call for a public meeting for the design and establishment of New York University. At the public meeting, held at the New York Historical Society in January 1830, Jonathan M. Wainwright of Grace Episcopal Church, echoing the thinking of the group, proposed a curriculum based on "useful instruction".

Rev. James M. Mathews was first Chancellor of New York University largely due to the confidence that Albert Gallatin had in him. New York University opened for instruction in Clinton Hall, opposite City Hall Park from Columbia College in a building secured through the assistance of Matthews. The building would only be NYU's home for a few years as Mathews looked uptown for a more suitable and permanent academic environment, more specifically bucolic Greenwich Village.

Rev. Mathews was also instrumental in the financial development, faculty and student growth and facility improvement of the university. He published a series of defenses of the Constitution and civil government as consistent with the Bible. In 1859 he delivered a baccalaureate address at the Virginia Military Institute.

Academic offices
New office	Chancellor of New York University; 1831–1839	Succeeded by Theodore Frelinghuysen
