= 1901 Uruguayan parliamentary election =

Parliamentary elections were held in Uruguay on 26 November 1901 to elect all members of the Chamber of Representatives.

== Electoral system ==
Suffrage was limited to literate men. Voting was not secret, as voters had to sign their ballot paper.

== Results ==
Results excludes vote figures from Colonia, Florida and Durazno.

Party	Votes	%	Seats
Colorado Party	15,268	54.95	42
National Party	12,516	45.05	25
Total	27,784	100.00	67
Source: Bottinelli et al and Madrid.
