= Charles Henry Gifford =

American painter

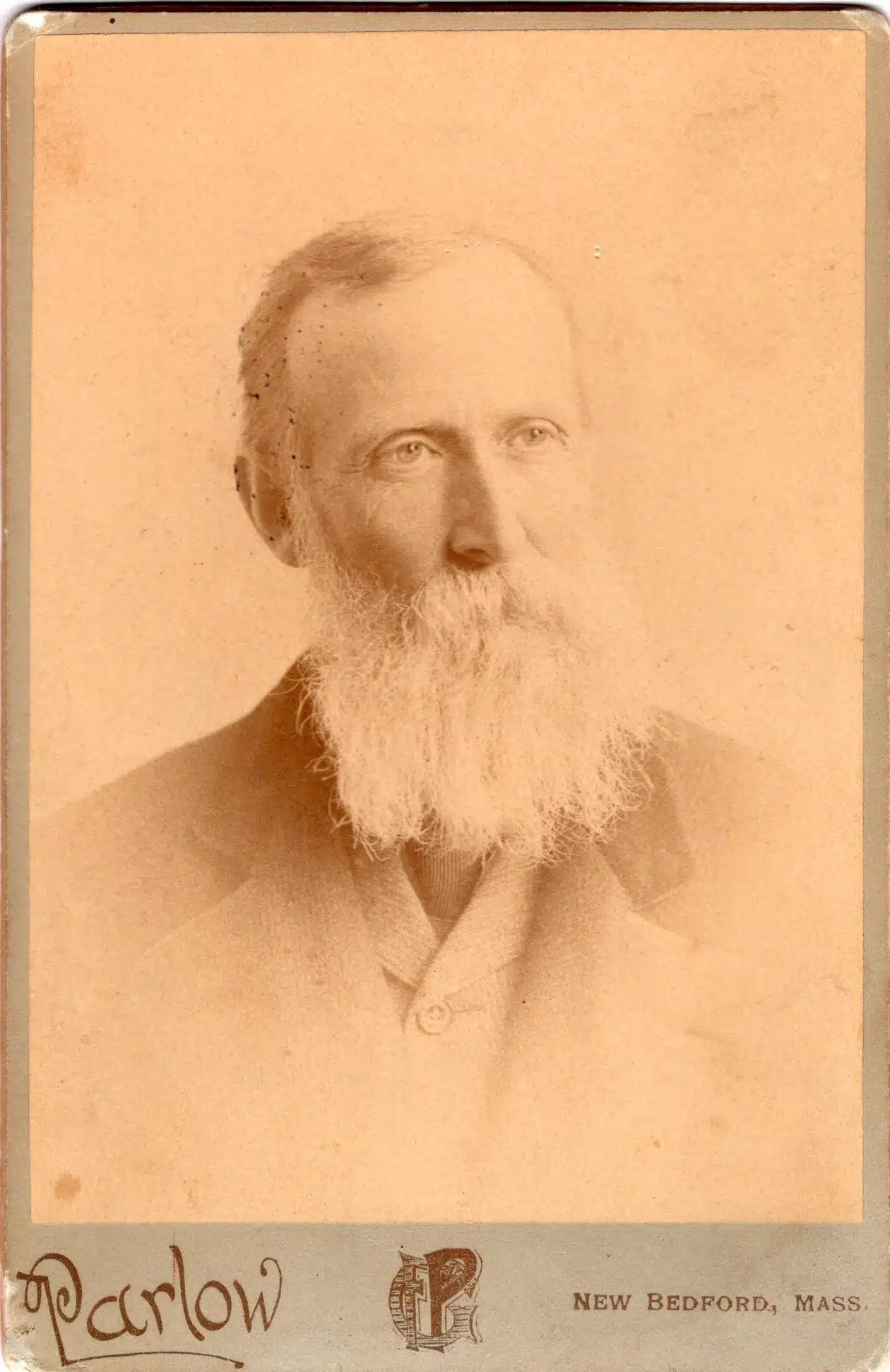
- Born: July 13, 1839; Fairhaven, Massachusetts, U.S.
- Died: January 20, 1904 (aged 64); Fairhaven, Massachusetts, U.S.
- Occupations: Marine and landscape painter

Charles Henry Gifford (July 13, 1839 – January 20, 1904) was an American marine and landscape painter. He was a member of the Hudson River School.

== Biography ==
Gifford was born on July 13, 1839, in Fairhaven, Massachusetts. He was initially apprenticed as a ship's carpenter, the same profession as his father. However, Charles soon quit that to become a shoemaker. Gifford taught himself how to paint after seeing one of Albert Bierstadt's paintings.

Gifford served in the American Civil War and became a prisoner of war at the Confederate-run Libby Prison, where he developed lifelong health problems. He became a painter full-time after the war. Gifford worked in the luminist style, and has also been considered a member of the Hudson River School art movement. He built a tower at his house in Fairhaven for better views of the sea and sky.

Gifford died on January 20, 1904, at his home in Fairhaven. He was survived by his wife and five married daughters.
