= Joseph T. Crowell =

American politician

10th President of the New Jersey Senate
- In office 1862–1863
- Preceded by: Edmund Perry
- Succeeded by: Anthony Reckless

Member of the New Jersey Senate from Union County
- In office 1861–1864
- Preceded by: John R. Ayres
- Succeeded by: James Jenkins

Speaker of the New Jersey General Assembly
- In office 1865–1866
- Preceded by: Joseph N. Taylor
- Succeeded by: John Hill

Personal details
- Born: December 27, 1817 Rahway, New Jersey
- Died: September 22, 1891 (aged 73) Rahway, New Jersey
- Party: Democratic

Joseph Tucker Crowell (December 27, 1817 – September 22, 1891) was an American printer, editor, and politician. He served as Speaker of the New Jersey General Assembly and as President of the New Jersey Senate.

== Biography ==
Crowell was born in Rahway, New Jersey in 1817, the son of Nathan and Harriet (Tucker) Crowell. He first learned the printer's trade working on the Elizabeth Journal of Elizabeth, New Jersey. He later set type on the first number of the Sunday Atlas in New York City and printed other New York journals. For five years he published Crowell's Pictorial and National Register, the first pictorial newspaper printed in the United States.

Crowell was a printing contractor for the United States Congress, working with Congressional printer Cornelius Wendell. Wendell had established a printing business in Washington, D.C., in a building designed in 1856 by Edward Clark. Crowell acquired the building in 1859. In 1861 he was presented with a check for $135,000 for the purchase of the building by the federal government to house the newly established Government Printing Office.

During the Civil War, Crowell became active politically as a War Democrat. In 1861, he was elected to the New Jersey Senate from Union County, serving as the body's president in 1862. He went on to serve in the New Jersey General Assembly, holding the position of Speaker in 1865.

Crowell became City Treasurer of Rahway in 1869. He was indicted in 1880 on charges of embezzlement of city funds, but the jury ended in a deadlock.

In the 1888 presidential election, Crowell left the Democratic Party to support the Republican ticket of Benjamin Harrison.

In 1891, Crowell died in Rahway at the age of 74.

Political offices
Preceded by Edmund Perry	President of the New Jersey Senate; 1862	Succeeded by Anthony Reckless
Preceded by John R. Ayres	Member of the New Jersey Senate from Union County; 1861-1864	Succeeded by James Jenkins
Preceded by Joseph N. Taylor	Speaker of the New Jersey General Assembly; 1865	Succeeded by John Hill
