= Thomas Lynch Raymond =

American mayor (1875–1928)

Thomas Lynch Raymond, Jr.
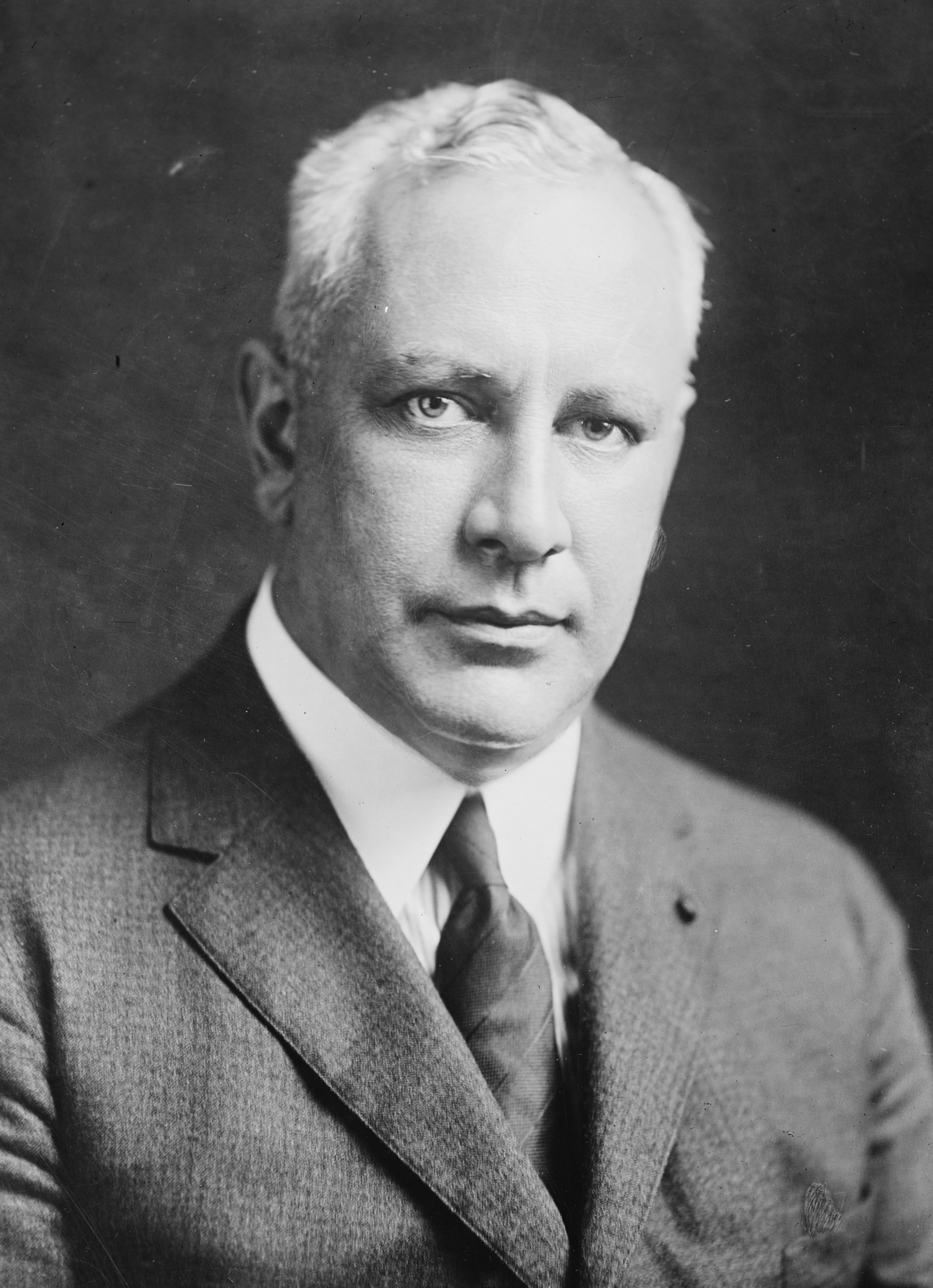

25th and 29th Mayor of Newark, New Jersey
- In office January 1, 1925 – January 1, 1928
- Preceded by: Frederick C. Breidenbach
- Succeeded by: Jerome T. Congleton
- In office January 1, 1915 – January 1, 1917
- Preceded by: Jacob Haussling
- Succeeded by: Charles P. Gillen

Personal details
- Born: April 7, 1875 East Orange, New Jersey
- Died: October 4, 1928 (aged 53) Newark, New Jersey
- Party: Republican
- Spouse: Elizabeth Gummere
- Education: New York University (LLB)
- Profession: Mayor, Newark, New Jersey

Thomas Lynch Raymond, Jr. (April 26, 1875 – October 4, 1928) served two non-consecutive terms as Mayor of Newark, New Jersey, from 1915 to 1917 and again from 1925 to 1928.

== Biography ==
Thomas Lynch Raymond, Jr. was born on April 26, 1875, in East Orange, New Jersey, to Thomas Lynch Raymond and Eugenia A. Raymond née Launitz. Launitz was the daughter of sculptor Robert Eberhard Launitz. Raymond's father was the President of Produce National Bank in New York. Thomas L. Raymond, Jr. began his schooling at the East Orange Public School System and then went to boarding school at Trinity College School in Port Hope, Ontario. Raymond then went to Newark Academy in Downtown Newark followed by New York University for his law degree. Due to a technicality, however, he did not receive his Bachelor of Laws degree until the commencement ceremony in 1915 when he was already mayor of Newark.

Raymond passed the New Jersey bar exam in November 1896. He began a partnership with Andrew Van Blarcom. In 1908, Judge Worrall F. Mountain and Theodore McCurdy Marsh became partners in their firm. On Thursday, April 23, 1903, Raymond married Elizabeth Gummere, daughter of Chief Justice William S. Gummere. In 1904, Raymond was appointed Judge of the First District Court of New Jersey by Governor Franklin Murphy. In 1908, Raymond became First Assistant Prosecutor of Essex County. In this year, he also ran for State Senate against Everett Colby. Raymond lost by 1300 votes and Newark was the only municipality of the twenty in the county, which he won.

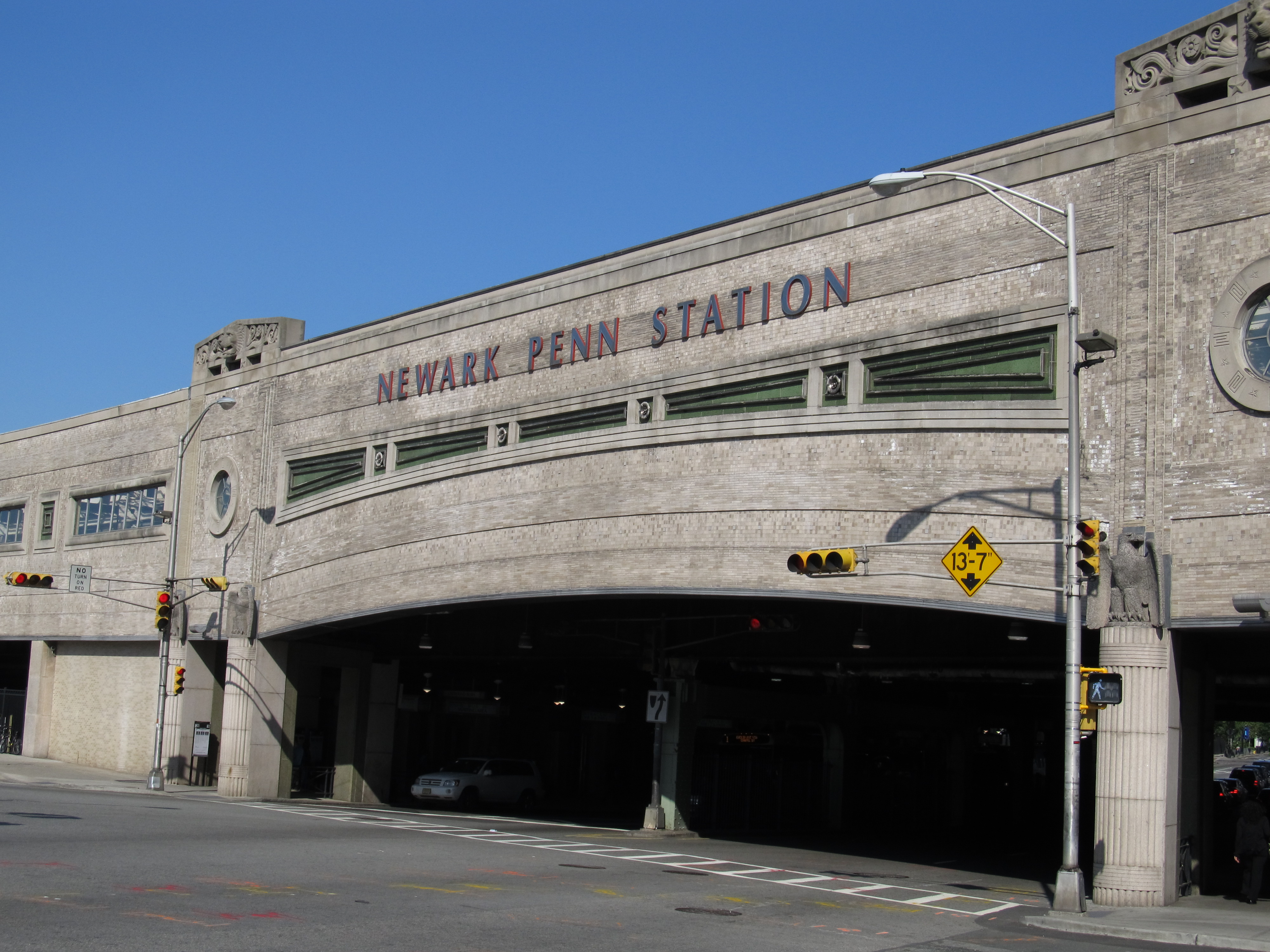
Raymond Plaza

During his first term as mayor of Newark, the Newark Meadows were filled in to construct the beginnings of Port Newark. In 1920, Raymond ran in the Gubernatorial primary and lost. In 1925, Thomas L. Raymond began his second term as mayor of Newark. In 1927, he announced his potential candidacy for the nomination of Governor (for 1929) and in 1928 a possible run for US Senate before his untimely death. Other offices Raymond held during his life included Supreme Court Commissioner, District Court Judge, Special Master in Chancery and Prosecutor of Essex County. Raymond died at 1 AM on October 4, 1928, in his Kinney Street house in Newark, after suffering from a cold and high blood pressure.

== Writings ==
- Raymond, Thomas Lynch. "Stephen Crane". Carteret: The Carteret Book Club, 1923.
- Raymond, Thomas Lynch. "Events which led to the development of the literature of the middle ages". Newark: Newark Public Library, 1926.

Political offices
Preceded by Frederick C. Breidenbach	Mayor of Newark; 1925–1928	Succeeded by Jerome T. Congleton
Preceded by Jacob Haussling	Mayor of Newark; 1915–1917	Succeeded by Charles P. Gillen
