= Oliver Spencer Halstead =

American politician

4th Mayor of Newark
- In office 1840–1841
- Preceded by: James Miller
- Succeeded by: William Wright

Personal details
- Born: September 22, 1792 Elizabeth, New Jersey
- Died: August 29, 1877 (aged 84) Newark, New Jersey
- Party: Whig

Oliver Spencer Halstead (September 22, 1792 – August 29, 1877) was an American politician who served as the Mayor of Newark, New Jersey from 1840 to 1841.
