= Aaron Woodruff =

American politician

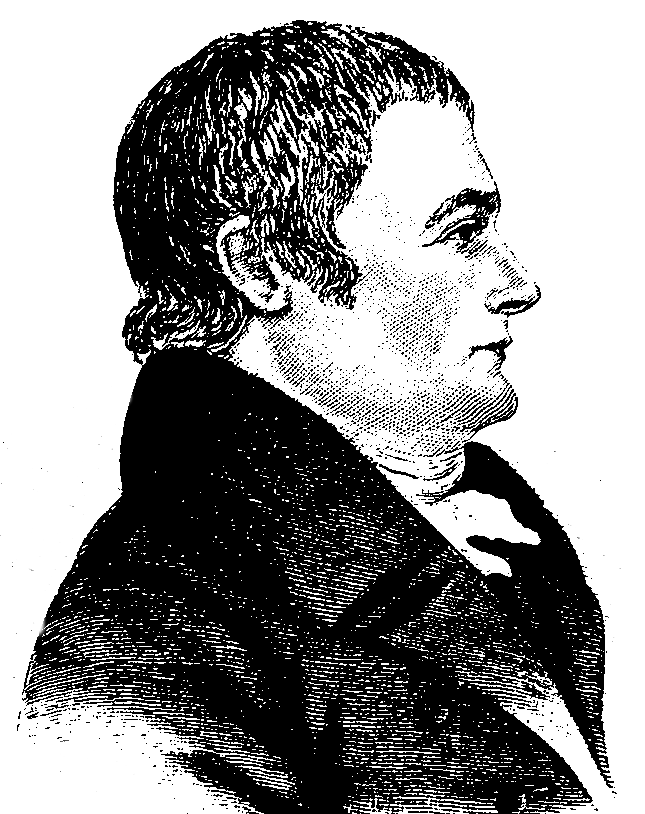

3rd and 5th Attorney General of New Jersey
- In office 1792–1811
- Governor: William Paterson; Richard Howell; Joseph Bloomfield
- Preceded by: Joseph Bloomfield
- Succeeded by: Andrew S. Hunter
- In office 1812 – June 24, 1817
- Governor: William Sanford Pennington; Mahlon Dickerson
- Preceded by: Andrew S. Hunter
- Succeeded by: Theodore Frelinghuysen

2nd Mayor of Trenton
- In office 1794–1797
- Preceded by: Moore Furman
- Succeeded by: James Ewing

Personal details
- Born: September 12, 1762
- Died: June 24, 1817 (aged 54)
- Party: Federalist Party

Aaron Dickinson Woodruff (September 12, 1762 – June 24, 1817) was the Attorney General of New Jersey from 1792 to 1811 and from 1812 to 1817.

== Biography ==
Woodruff was born in 1762 in Elizabeth, New Jersey, the oldest child of Elias and Mary Joline Woodruff. In 1779 he graduated from Princeton College as the valedictorian for his class. After serving in the American Revolutionary War, he was admitted to the bar in 1784. He served in the Electoral College and won a seat in the New Jersey General Assembly from Hunterdon County. As a legislator he was influential in having Trenton selected as the state capital in 1790.

In 1793, he was appointed New Jersey Attorney General and served in the position until 1811, when he was replaced by Andrew S. Hunter. Woodruff, who was a Federalist, was ousted by the Democratic-Republicans who had taken control of the New Jersey Legislature in that year's elections. However, when the Federalists regained control of the Legislature in 1812, they reinstated Woodruff as Attorney General.

Woodruff continued to serve until his death in 1817. He died at the home of his brother-in-law in Changewater (now Warren County, New Jersey).

Legal offices
Preceded by Joseph Bloomfield	Attorney General of New Jersey; 1792 – 1811	Succeeded by Andrew S. Hunter
Preceded by Andrew S. Hunter	Attorney General of New Jersey; 1812 – 1817	Succeeded by Theodore Frelinghuysen
