= Jacksonville, Morris County, New Jersey =

Populated place in Morris County, New Jersey, US

Jacksonville, New Jersey
- Unincorporated community
- Location in Morris County (Inset: Morris County in New Jersey) Jacksonville (New Jersey) Jacksonville (the United States)
- Coordinates: 40°57′10″N 74°19′35″W
- Country: United States
- State: New Jersey
- County: Morris
- Township(s): Pequannock, Montville
- Borough(s): Kinnelon, Lincoln Park
- Elevation: 325 ft (99 m)
- Time zone: UTC−05:00 (Eastern (EST))
  - Summer (DST): UTC−04:00 (Eastern (EDT))
- GNIS feature ID: 877397

Jacksonville is an unincorporated community located within four municipalities originally in Pequannock Township, in Morris County, in the U.S. state of New Jersey. Located in the area of Jacksonville Road (County Route 504) and Sunset Road, the area consists of residential houses and a church. In the 19th century, the area known as Jacksonville was wholly located within Pequannock Township. A school existed a few hundred feet south of the Church. Upon the creation of the township of Montville in 1867, Jacksonville was split between these two municipalities.

In 1922, the borough of Kinnelon and the borough of Lincoln Park were created out of a portion of Pequannock Township, further splitting Jacksonville into a portion of four municipalities.
