= 1901 Danish local elections =

Regional elections were held in Denmark in 1901. Six municipal council members were elected for Copenhagen's municipal council.
