= James M. Seymour =

American mayor (1837–1905)

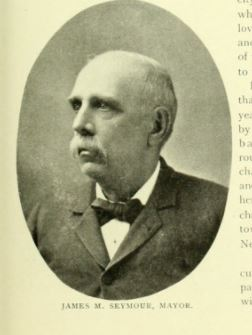

22nd Mayor of Newark
- In office January 1, 1896 – January 1, 1903
- Preceded by: Julius A. Lebkuecher
- Succeeded by: Henry Meade Doremus

Personal details
- Born: James Madison Seymour; January 30, 1837 New York, New York
- Died: April 1, 1905 (aged 68) Newark, New Jersey
- Party: Democratic

James Madison Seymour (January 30, 1837 – April 1, 1905) was the mayor of Newark, New Jersey, from January 1, 1896, to January 1, 1903.

== Biography ==
He was born on January 30, 1837, in New York City. At the age of two, in 1839, Seymour's father died in a yellow fever epidemic in New Orleans. His mother remarried Jose Vantana, and the family went to reside in Spain. Seymour attended St. Austin's College in Cádiz. At the age of 17 he began an apprenticeship at Novelty Iron Works of New York and was subsequently employed by the Erie Railroad. When he was 21, in 1858, he was appointed master mechanic of a railroad from Matanzas to Puerto Príncipe in Cuba, and later worked for two years as chief engineer of a large Cuban sugar plantation.

He married Amanda Elizabeth Crowell in 1859, and they had one son, James Murray Seymour. After the death of his first wife, he married her sister Anna J. Crowell, and the couple also had one son, David C. Seymour.

In 1865 he joined with Daniel Whitlock to form the engineering firm of Seymour and Whitlock in Newark, New Jersey. In 1884 he was elected to the Newark Aqueduct Board, re-elected in 1887. In 1888 President Grover Cleveland appointed him as one of the United States Commissioners to Spain. In 1891 Governor Leon Abbett named him the State Supervisor of Prisons.

Seymour was a candidate for Mayor of Newark in 1894 but lost by nearly 5,000 votes. He ran for mayor again in 1896 and won by a margin of 3,396 votes. He was re-elected as mayor in 1898 and 1900. Seymour argued for the creation of "Greater Newark" by the annexation of a number of nearby towns: East Orange, Vailsburg, Harrison, Kearney, and Belleville. Of these, only Vailsburg was eventually annexed to Newark.

In 1901 he was the Democratic candidate for Governor of New Jersey, opposing the Republican Franklin Murphy. He lost the election by a vote of 183,814 to 166,681.

Seymour died in 1905 at his Newark, New Jersey, home at the age of 68.

Political offices
| Preceded by Julius A. Lebkuecher | Mayor of Newark; January 1, 1896 – January 1, 1903 | Succeeded by Henry Meade Doremus |
Party political offices
| Preceded by Elvin W. Crane | Democratic Nominee for Governor of New Jersey; 1901 | Succeeded by Charles C. Black |
