= Moses Bigelow =

Mayor of Newark, New Jersey from 1857 to 1864

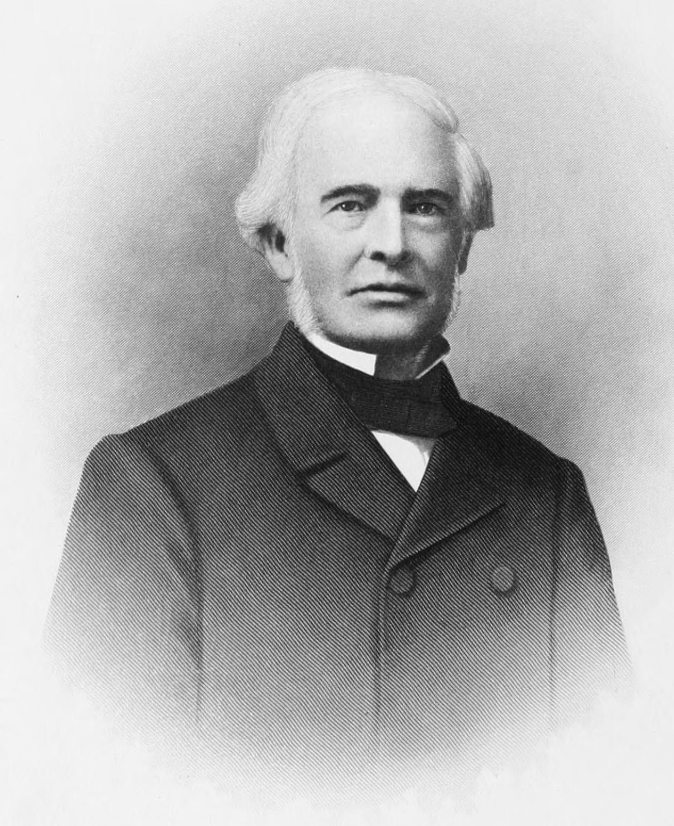

12th Mayor of Newark
- In office January 6, 1857 – January 1864
- Preceded by: Horace J. Poinier
- Succeeded by: Theodore Runyon

Personal details
- Born: January 12, 1800; Essex County, New Jersey
- Died: January 10, 1874 (aged 73); Newark, New Jersey
- Political party: Democratic
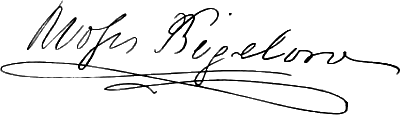
- Signature

Moses Bigelow (January 12, 1800 – January 10, 1874) was an American politician who served as the Mayor of Newark from 1857 to 1864.

== Biography ==
Moses Bigelow was born in Essex County, New Jersey, on January 12, 1800.

He died in Newark on January 10, 1874.
