= Alexander Archibald (politician) =

American politician

27th Mayor of Newark
- In office 1921–1922
- Preceded by: Charles P. Gillen
- Succeeded by: Frederick C. Breidenbach

Personal details
- Born: December 13, 1869 Edinburgh, Scotland
- Died: February 11, 1922 (aged 52) Newark, New Jersey
- Party: Democratic

Alexander Archibald (December 13, 1869 – February 11, 1922) served as Mayor of Newark, New Jersey, from 1921 until his death the following year.

== Biography ==
Archibald was born on December 13, 1869, in Scotland to William and Margaret Archibald. He and his parents immigrated to the United States in 1871 and settled in Newark, New Jersey.

After serving on the City Council, Archibald was elected Mayor of Newark in 1921.

He died Saturday, February 11, 1922, after surgery for a brain tumor.

Political offices
Preceded by Charles P. Gillen	Mayor of Newark; 1921–1922	Succeeded by Frederick C. Breidenbach
