= 1901 New Jersey gubernatorial election =

- November 5, 1901
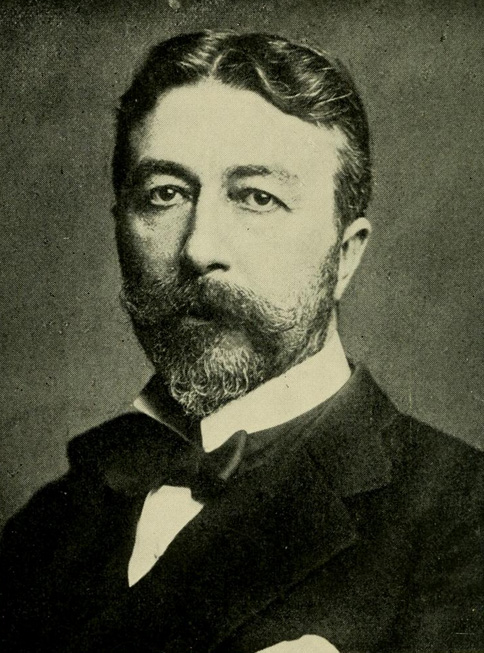

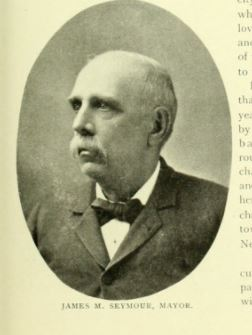
Nominee	Franklin Murphy	James M. Seymour
Party	Republican	Democratic
Popular vote	183,814	166,681
Percentage	50.88%	46.14%
- County results Murphy: 40–50% 50–60% 60–70% Seymour: 50–60%
Governor before election
Foster McGowan Voorhees
Republican
Elected Governor
Franklin Murphy
Republican

The 1901 New Jersey gubernatorial election was held on November 5, 1901. Republican nominee Franklin Murphy defeated Democratic nominee James M. Seymour with 50.88% of the vote.

== Republican nomination ==
At the Republican convention in Trenton on September 26, Franklin Murphy was nominated without opposition. His name was presented by Senator Thomas N. McCarter of Essex and his nomination was seconded by George Record. A speech was given by John W. Griggs and much of the convention was devoted to mourning the death of President William McKinley less than two weeks prior.

== Democratic nomination ==
=== Candidates ===
- Christian Braun, former State Senator for Passaic County and mayor of Paterson
- Howard Carrow, Camden attorney
- Thomas M. Ferrell, former U.S. Representative from Glassboro
- James E. Martine, member of the Plainfield Common Council
- James M. Seymour, mayor of Newark

The Democratic convention was held in Trenton on October 1. Unlike the Republican convention, the nomination for Governor was hotly contested and required two ballots to resolved.

1901 Democratic state convention, first ballot
Party	Candidate	Votes	%
Democratic	James M. Seymour	488	42.77%
Democratic	Thomas M. Ferrell	480	42.07%
Democratic	Christian Braun	91	7.98%
Democratic	Howard Carrow	60	5.26%
Democratic	James E. Martine	22	1.93%
Total votes		1,141	100.00%

1901 Democratic state convention, second ballot
Party	Candidate	Votes	%
Democratic	James M. Seymour	659	56.76%
Democratic	Thomas M. Ferrell	417	35.92%
Democratic	Christian Braun	85	7.32%
Total votes		1,161	100.00%

== General election ==
=== Candidates ===
- Joel W. Brown (Prohibition)
- Franklin Murphy, businessman and chair of the New Jersey Republican Party (Republican)
- James M. Seymour, mayor of Newark (Democratic)
- Charles H. Vail, pastor of the First Universalist Church in Jersey City (Socialist)
- Frank W. Wilson (Socialist Labor)

=== Results ===
1901 New Jersey gubernatorial election
Party	Candidate	Votes	%	±%
Republican	Franklin Murphy	183,814	50.88%	▲1.97
Democratic	James M. Seymour	166,681	46.14%	▼1.13
Prohibition	Joel W. Brown	5,365	1.49%	▼0.55
Socialist	Charles H. Vail	3,489	0.97%	N/A
Socialist Labor	Frank W. Wilson	1,918	0.53%	▼1.10
Majority				
Total votes		361,267	100.00%	
Republican hold		Swing		
