= List of mayors of Newark, New Jersey =

Mayor of Newark
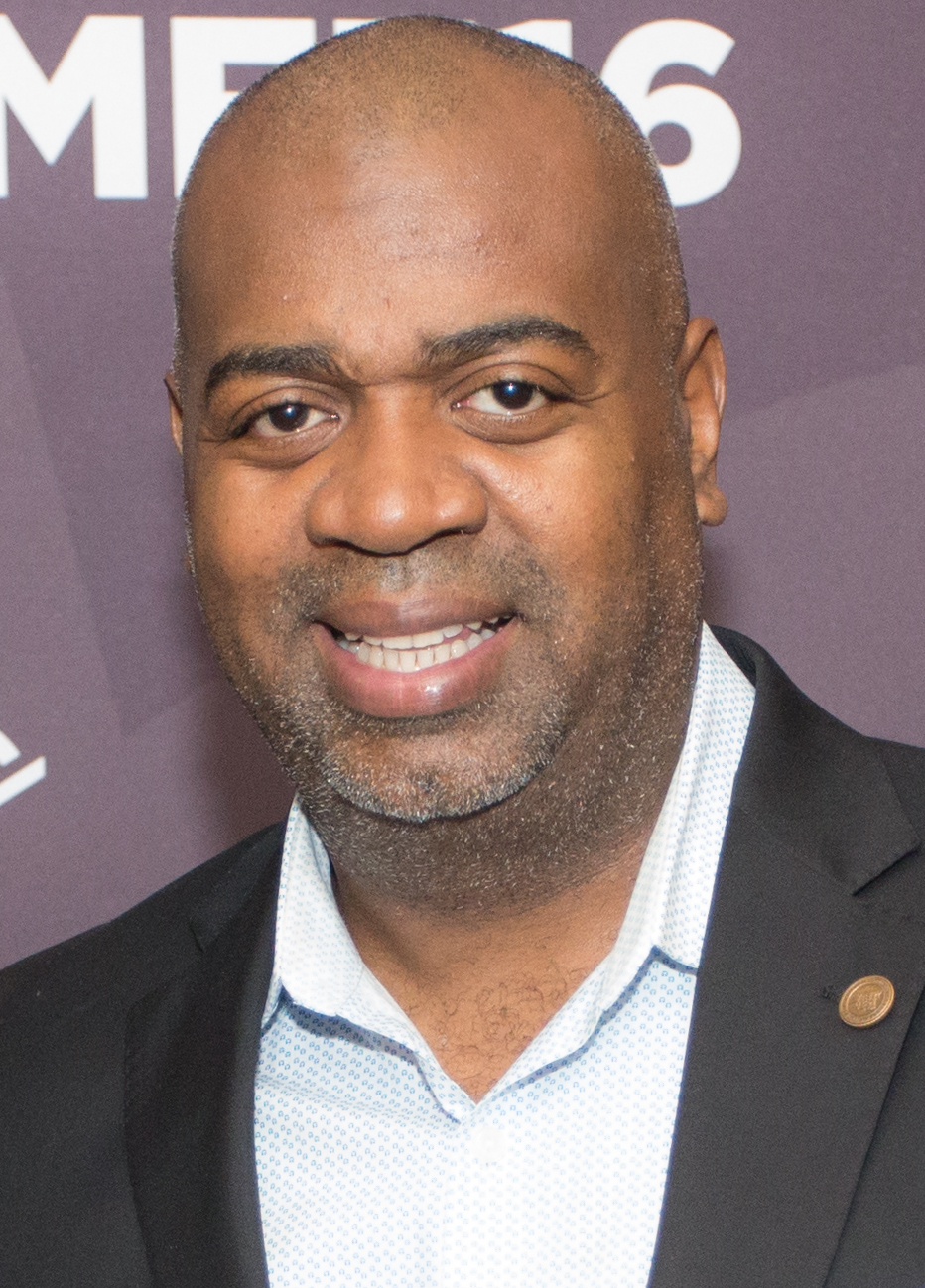
- Incumbent; Ras Baraka since July 1, 2014
- Style: His Honor
- Residence: Private
- Term length: Four years; may serve consecutive terms
- Inaugural holder: William Halsey
- Formation: 1836
- Salary: $180,000 in 2019
- Website: Office of the Mayor (Official)

The Mayor of Newark is the head of the executive branch of government of Newark, New Jersey, United States. The mayor has the duty to enforce the municipal charter and ordinances; prepare the annual budget; appoint deputy mayors, department heads, and aides; and approve or veto ordinances passed by the Municipal Council.

Newark, New Jersey, was founded in 1666 and became a township on October 31, 1693, and granted a Royal charter on April 27, 1713. It was incorporated by an act of the New Jersey Legislature on February 21, 1798, and reincorporated as city in 1836. The city is governed within the Faulkner Act, formally known as the Optional Municipal Charter Law, under the Mayor-Council Plan C form of local government, which became effective as of July 1, 1954, after the voters of the city passed a referendum held on November 3, 1953.

The mayor of Newark is elected for a four-year term. Municipal elections (for mayor and municipal council) are nonpartisan and are held on the 2nd Tuesday in May. Mayor Ras Baraka was first elected in the Newark mayoral election on May 13, 2014.

== Mayors ==
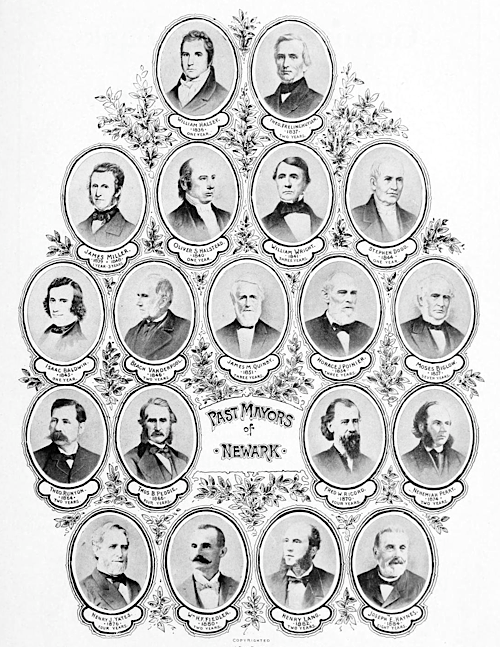
Mayors of Newark up to 1916

#	Mayor	Term start	Term end	Party	Notes
1	William Halsey	1836	April 13, 1837	Whig	William Halsey was the first mayor of Newark.
2	Theodore Frelinghuysen	April 13, 1837	1838	Whig	
3	James Miller	1838	1840	Whig	
4	Oliver Spencer Halstead	1840	1841	Whig	
5	William Wright	1841	1843	Whig	
6	Stephen Dod	1844	April 3, 1845	Whig	
7	Isaac Baldwin	April 3, 1845	April 21, 1846	Whig	Baldwin did not attend the first meeting; he was unwell.
8	Beach Vanderpool	April 21, 1846	1848	Whig	
9	James Miller	1848	January 7, 1851	Whig	
10	James M. Quinby	January 7, 1851	January 3, 1854	Whig	
11	Horace J. Poinier	January 3, 1854	1857	Whig	
12	Moses Bigelow	1857	1864	Democratic	
13	Theodore Runyon	1864	1866	Democratic	
14	Thomas Baldwin Peddie	1866	Jan 4, 1870	Republican	
15	Frederick William Ricord	Jan 4, 1870	Jan 6, 1874	Republican	
16	Nehemiah Perry	Jan 6, 1874	Jan 4, 1876	Democratic	
17	Henry J. Yates	Jan 4, 1876	January 6, 1880	Republican	
18	William H. F. Fiedler	January 6, 1880	January 3, 1882	Democratic	
19	Henry Lang	January 3, 1882	January 8, 1884	Republican	
20	Joseph E. Haynes	January 8, 1884	May 7, 1894	Democratic	
21	Julius A. Lebkuecher	May 7, 1894	May 1, 1896	Republican	
22	James M. Seymour	May 1, 1896	January 1, 1903	Democratic	Sworn in May 4
23	Henry Meade Doremus	January 1, 1903	January 1, 1907	Republican	
24	Jacob Haussling	January 1, 1907	January 1, 1915	Democratic	
25	Thomas Lynch Raymond	January 1, 1915	Nov 20, 1917	Republican	
26	Charles P. Gillen	Nov 20, 1917	May 17, 1921	Democratic	
27	Alexander Archibald	May 17, 1921	Feb 11, 1922	Democratic	Term ends with death
28	Frederick C. Breidenbach	Feb 11, 1922	May 19, 1925	Republican	Elected by board on the death of Archibald
29	Thomas Lynch Raymond	May 19, 1925	Oct 6, 1928	Republican	Term ends with death
30	Jerome T. Congleton	Oct 22, 1928	May 16, 1933	Republican	Appointed on the death of Raymond
31	Meyer C. Ellenstein	May 16, 1933	May 19, 1941	Republican	
32	Vincent J. Murphy	May 19, 1941	May 17, 1949	Democratic	
33	Ralph A. Villani	May 17, 1949	May 15, 1953	Republican	
34	Leo P. Carlin	May 15, 1953	July 1, 1962	Democratic	
35	Hugh Joseph Addonizio	July 1, 1962	July 1, 1970	Democratic	Last non-Hispanic white mayor.
36	Kenneth Allen Gibson	July 1, 1970	July 1, 1986	Democratic	Kenneth Allen Gibson was the first African-American Mayor of Newark. He was the first African American elected mayor of any major Northeastern United States city.
37	Sharpe James	July 1, 1986	July 1, 2006	Democratic	Served for 20 years.
38	Cory Booker	July 1, 2006	October 31, 2013	Democratic	Ran against Sharpe James in 2002 and lost; won in 2006 (incumbent James did not seek reelection).
39	Luis A. Quintana	November 4, 2013	July 1, 2014	Democratic	Became acting mayor after Cory Booker's resignation to become a Class 2 member of the United States Senate.
40	Ras Baraka	July 1, 2014	Incumbent	Democratic	Ras Baraka is the current mayor of Newark. He has been serving for 12 years, 2 months and 6 days.

== See also ==
- List of elected officials in Newark, New Jersey
- 1970 Newark mayoral election
- 2014 Newark mayoral election
- History of Newark, New Jersey
