= 1901 Ohio gubernatorial election =

- November 5, 1901
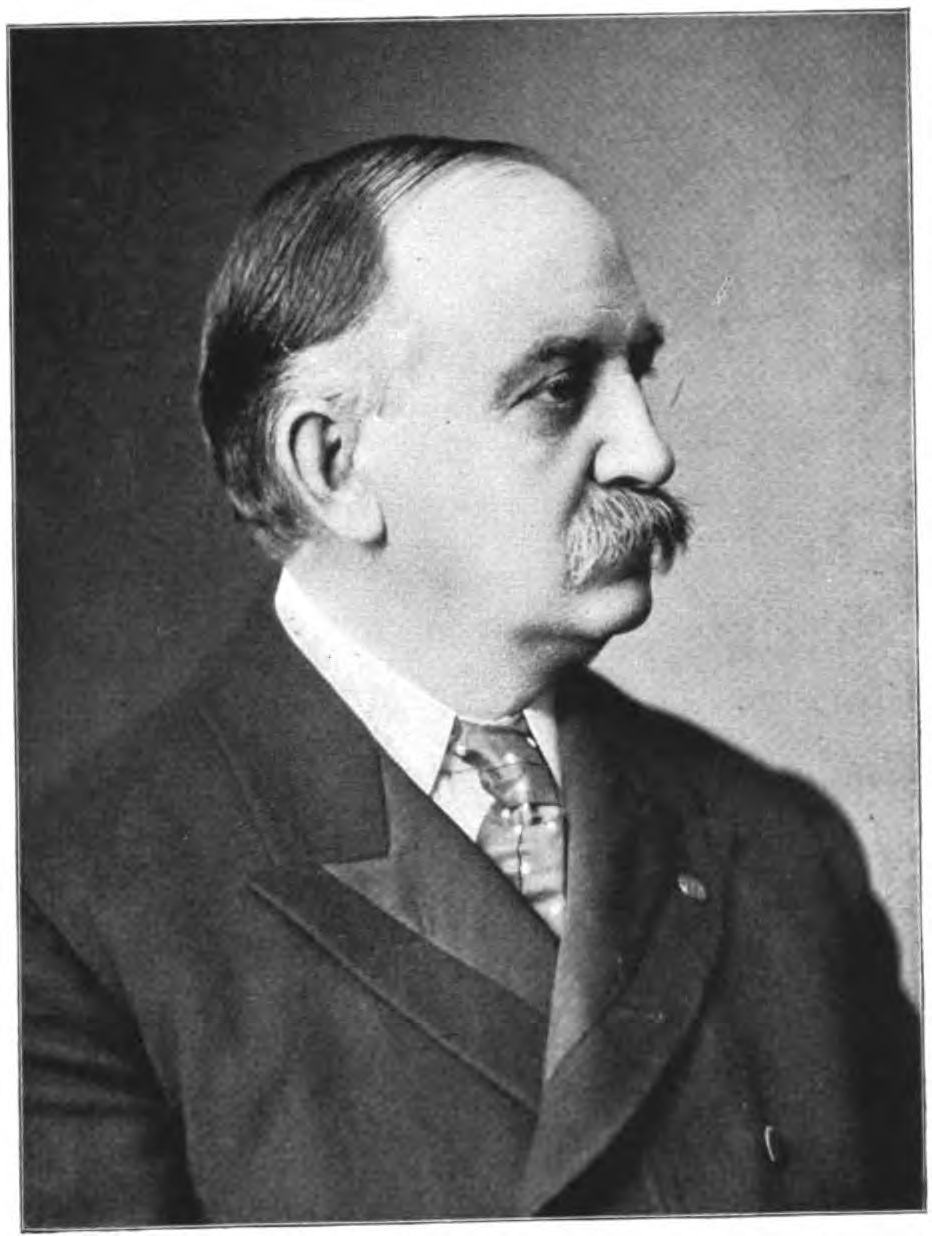

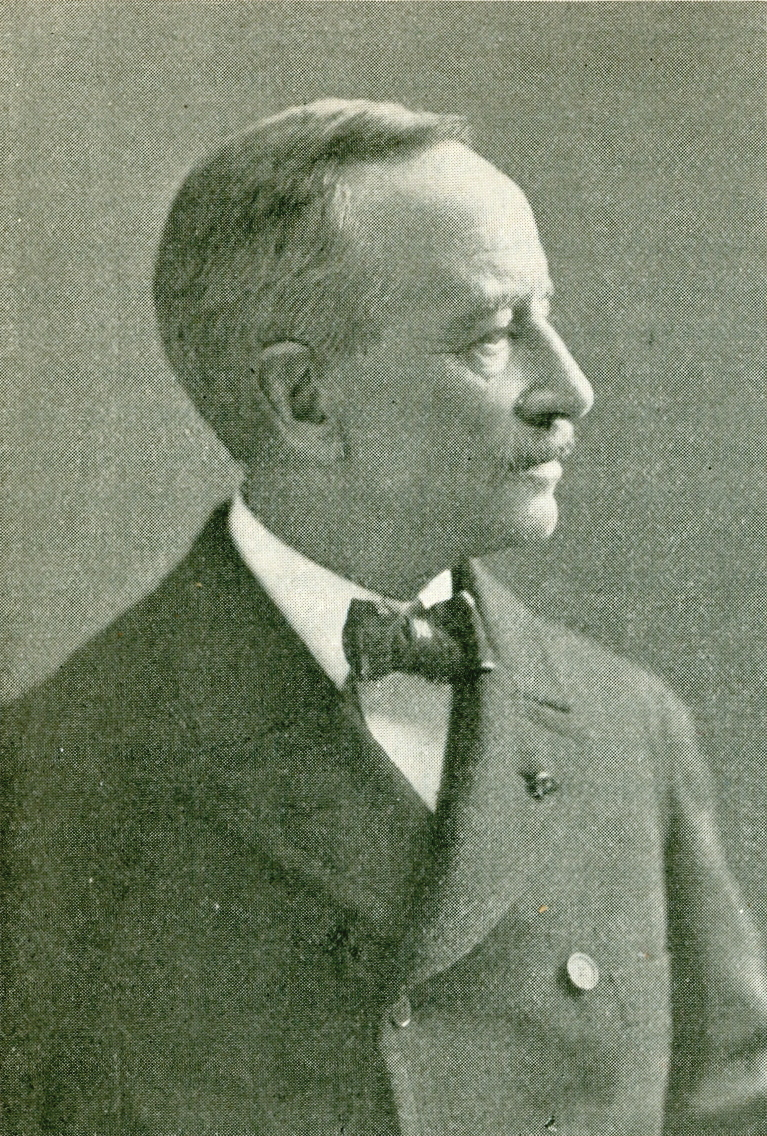
Nominee	George K. Nash	James Kilbourne
Party	Republican	Democratic
Popular vote	436,092	368,525
Percentage	52.70%	44.53%
- County results Nash: 40–50% 50–60% 60–70% 70–80% Kilbourne: 40–50% 50–60% 60–70%
Governor before election
George K. Nash
Republican
Elected Governor
George K. Nash
Republican

The 1901 Ohio gubernatorial election was held on November 5, 1901. Incumbent Republican George K. Nash defeated Democratic nominee James Kilbourne with 52.70% of the vote.

== General election ==
=== Candidates ===
Major party candidates

- George K. Nash, Republican
- James Kilbourne, Democratic

Other candidates

- E. Jay Pinney, Prohibition
- Harry C. Thompson, Socialist
- John H.T. Juergens, Socialist Labor
- John Richardson, Union Reform

=== Results ===
1901 Ohio gubernatorial election
Party	Candidate	Votes	%	±%
Republican	George K. Nash (incumbent)	436,092	52.70%	
Democratic	James Kilbourne	368,525	44.53%	
Prohibition	E. Jay Pinney	9,878	1.19%	
Socialist	Harry C. Thompson	7,359	0.89%	
Socialist Labor	John H.T. Juergens	2,994	0.36%	
Independent	John Richardson	2,718	0.33%	
Majority		67,567		
Turnout				
Republican hold		Swing		
