= Charles H. Vail =

American Universalist clergyman, political activist, and writer

Charles H. Vail as he appeared in 1900

Charles Henry Vail (April 28, 1866 – June 16, 1924) was an American Universalist clergyman and Christian socialist political activist and writer. Vail is best remembered as the first National Organizer of the Socialist Party of America and as a candidate of that party for Governor of New Jersey.

== Biography ==
=== Early years ===
Charles Henry Vail was born in Tully, New York on April 28, 1866. He attended public school in Tully and learned the trade of barrelmaker upon completion, working with his father for several years in that field. Vail also showed considerable aptitude in the field of music and so he went to New York City to study under Dr. H.R. Palmer, a course which he completed in 1885. Thereafter, he taught large classes in both vocal and instrumental music throughout New York City. In addition to group lessons, Vail conducted private lessons in voice, banjo, guitar, clarinet, and organ. In 1887 he moved to Syracuse, New York, where he continued to teach music for the next two years.

Although raised as an orthodox Protestant in the Disciple Church, Vail came to question some of its fundamental teachings and he turned to Universalism, ironically spurred to this belief by an anti-Universalist book purchased by his parents to dissuade him from that belief system.

Vail became an enthusiastic adherent of Universalism and came to consider the propagation of its message to be his life mission. Vail enrolled in the Theological School of St. Lawrence University at Canton, New York. He graduated in 1892 with a Bachelor of Divinity degree, but remained through 1893 to take a graduate course.

Vail's 1899 book Principles of Scientific Socialism was one of the standard introductions to the subject during the first two decades of the 20th century. A translation was published by Finnish-American socialists in Oregon in 1911.

In August 1888, Vail married Mary C. Ellis of Owasco, New York, but his wife fell ill and lived only a short time. He was married a second time in July 1892 to Niva Bedell of Geneva, New York, a classmate from divinity school and fellow graduate of the class of 1892.

Vail's first pastorate was in Albany, New York, where he spent a year at All Souls Church. He then moved to the First Universalist Church of Jersey City, New Jersey, remaining in that post for the next seven years.

=== Political career ===
Although raised as a Republican, Vail's political opinions shifted fairly rapidly, turning to socialism. In 1898 Vail and his second wife, Nina Bedell Vail, herself an ordained Universalist minister, were both designated deputy organizers of the Brotherhood of the Cooperative Commonwealth, an organization which was attempting to establish socialist colonies in Washington state.

At the end of 1900, Vail resigned his pastorate and accepted a job as the National Organizer of the Social Democratic Party of America, forerunner of the Socialist Party of America. In this capacity, Vail toured the United States speaking on various socialist topics for seven of the first nine months of 1901, traveling over 14,000 miles and visiting 19 states. He was accompanied by his wife Nina, who often shared the platform with him.

On January 1, 1901, Vail was nominated by the Social Democratic Party of New Jersey as its candidate for Governor of New Jersey. He stepped down from his position as pastor of the First Universalist Church in Jersey City to pursue this political office, with the position filled by his wife Nina, amidst much publicity and comment on the novelty of a husband and wife team occupying a single pulpit.

After resting for the month of September, Vail hit the campaign trail. In the immediate aftermath of the August assassination of President William McKinley by Leon Czolgosz, an anarchist, Vail faced hostile crowds and suffered cancelled meetings by those who confused the doctrines of socialism and anarchism. Vail refused to bow to intimidation and delivered 29 addresses during the course of the 1901 campaign. By the end of the year, Vail had toured 25 states and delivered 241 public lectures.

=== Return to the pulpit ===
Vail's Christian socialist aphorisms continued to be printed in the radical press into the 1920s.

During the first decade of the 20th century, Vail served in a succession of Universalist pastorates, including positions at Richfield Springs and Albion, New York. He would later accept a position at the Church of Good Tidings in Brooklyn.

Vail continued to preach until his final years, serving as half-time pastor of a congregation in the small town of Merom, Indiana during the early 1920s.

=== Death and legacy ===
Charles H. Vail died at his home in Auburn, New York on June 16, 1924.

== Works ==
- National Ownership of Railways. New York: Humboldt Library, 1897.
- Modern Socialism. New York: Commonwealth Co., 1897.
- Principles of Scientific Socialism. New York: Commonwealth Co., 1899; Reissued by Kerr, 1908.
- The Industrial Evolution. New York: Commonwealth Co., 1899.
- Mission of the Working Class. Chicago: Charles H. Kerr & Co., 1899.
- The Trust Question: Its Political and Economic Aspects. Chicago: Charles H. Kerr & Co., 1900.
- "The Mission of the Workingman," The Challenge [Los Angeles], whole no. 32 (July 31, 1901), pp. 1–3.
- The Socialist Movement. Chicago: Charles H. Kerr & Co., 1902.
- Socialism and the Negro Problem. New York: Comrade Publishing Co., 1902.
- The Ancient Mysteries and Modern Masonry. New York: Macoy Publishing and Masonic Supply Co., 1909.
- The World's Saviors: Analogies in their Lives Examined and Interpreted: A Study in Comparative Religions. London: Fowler, 1913.
- Militant and Triumphant Socialism. Chicago: Co-operative Printing Co., 1913.
