= 2006 Newark mayoral election =

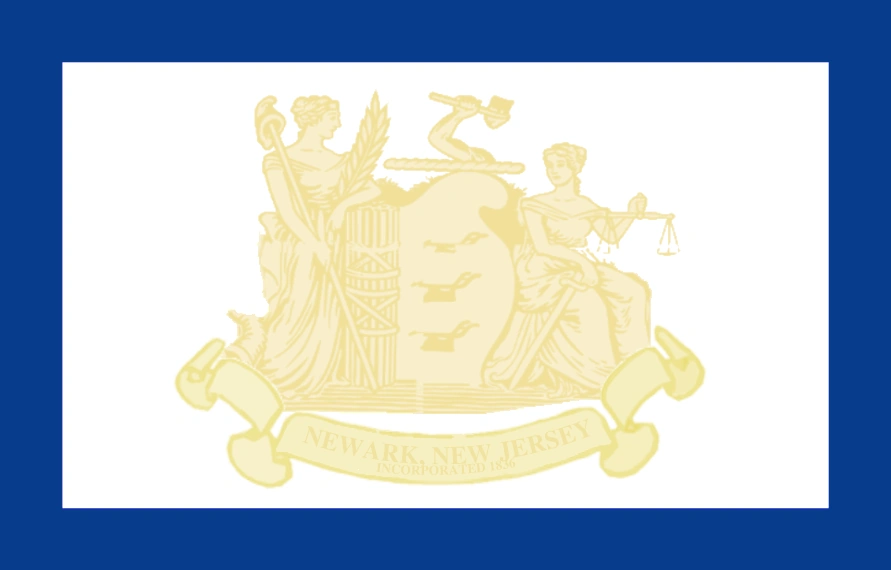
- May 9, 2006
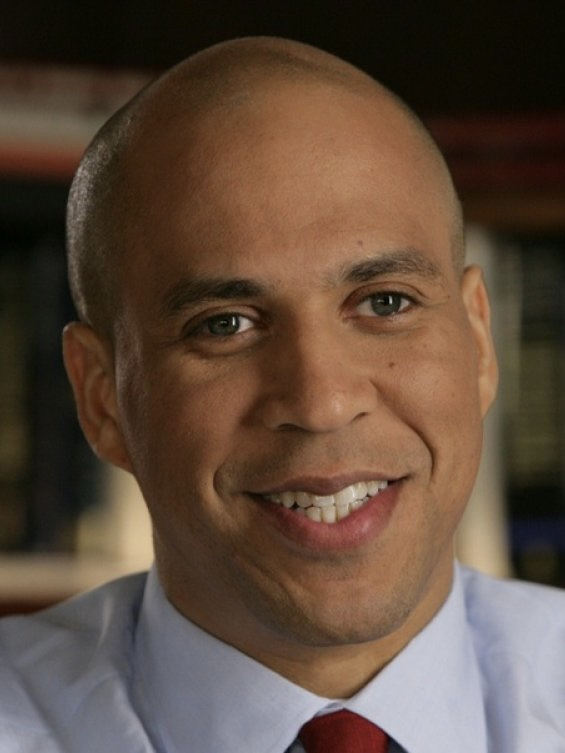

| Candidate | Cory Booker | Ronald Rice |
| Party | Nonpartisan | Nonpartisan |
| Popular vote | 32,134 | 10,337 |
| Percentage | 72.15% | 23.21% |
Mayor before election
Sharpe James
Democratic
Elected mayor
Cory Booker
Democratic

The 2006 election for Mayor of Newark took place in Newark, the most populous city in the state of New Jersey, on May 9, 2006. Newark is organized under the Faulkner Act. Elections for all seats on the nine member Municipal Council of Newark were held the same day. A runoff election, if necessary, would have taken place. Elections in the city are non-partisan and candidates are not listed by political party.

Incumbent Sharpe James did not run. Ronald L. Rice, State Senator since 1986 for 28th Legislative District, and Municipal Council member Cory Booker were the main candidates in the field of four. Booker won with 72% of the vote, thus precluding run-off. Rice, the runner-up, received 23%.

== Candidates ==
On March 27, 2006, James announced that he would not seek a sixth term, preferring to focus on his seat in the New Jersey Senate.

On March 6, 2006, Rice, who had run for mayor in 1998, entered the mayoral race again, noting "that Mayor James had encouraged him to run but noted that if the mayor decided to join the race, his candidacy could change."

Booker had become municipal council member in 1998. He ran and lost in the 2002 mayoral election, his campaign for which is the subject of the 2005 documentary Street Fight. Booker was re-elected in the 2010 election. After winning the October 16, 2013 special election for U.S. senator Booker resigned as mayor; on October 31 of that year, he was sworn in as the junior U.S. senator from New Jersey. In 2020, Booker went on to run for president, ultimately losing the race for the Democratic nomination to Joe Biden.

2006 Newark mayoral election
| Party | Candidate | Votes | % |
|---|---|---|---|
| Nonpartisan | Cory Booker | 32,134 | 72.15% |
| Nonpartisan | Ronald Rice | 10,337 | 23.21% |
| Nonpartisan | David Blount | 1,831 | 4.11% |
| Nonpartisan | Nancy Rosenstock | 238 | 0.53% |
| Total votes | | 44,540 | 100.00% |
