= Epidemic Intelligence Service =

U.S. Centers for Disease Control and Prevention program

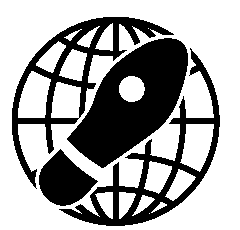
- Logo of the Epidemic Intelligence Service

Agency overview
- Formed: October 26, 1951; 74 years ago
- Headquarters: Atlanta, Georgia, U.S.; 33°47′58″N 84°19′42″W
- Employees: 60
- Parent agency: Centers for Disease Control and Prevention
- Website: www.cdc.gov/eis/

The Epidemic Intelligence Service (EIS) is a program of the United States' Centers for Disease Control and Prevention (CDC). The modern EIS is a two-year, hands-on post-doctoral training program in epidemiology, with a focus on field work.

== History ==
Alexander Langmuir, Chief of the U.S. Public Health Service, proposed the creation of the Epidemic Intelligence Service on March 30, 1951. Langmuir argued that the agency could identify appropriate defense measures against biological warfare germs, develop new detection methods, and train laboratory workers to rapidly recognize biological warfare germs. This justification arose from biological warfare concerns during the Korean War.

The Epidemic Intelligence Service was organized on September 26, 1951, with the purpose of investigating disease outbreaks that are beyond the control of state and local health departments, enforcing interstate quarantine regulations, and providing epidemic aid at the request of state health agencies. The Epidemic Intelligence Service's first staff members were 21 medical officers of the Public Health Service.

== Background ==
The EIS is operated by the CDC's Center for Surveillance, Epidemiology, and Laboratory Services (CSELS), in the Office of Public Health Scientific Services (OPHSS).

Program participants, known colloquially as "disease detectives", are formally called "EIS officers" (or EIS fellows) by the CDC and have been dispatched to investigate hundreds of possible epidemics created by natural and artificial causes. Since 1951, more than 3,000 EIS officers have been involved in domestic and international response efforts, including the anthrax, hantavirus, West Nile virus in the United States, and the 2013–2016 Ebola outbreak in West Africa.

EIS officers begin their fellowship with a one-month training program at CDC headquarters in Atlanta, Georgia; however, 95% of their two-year term consists of experiential rather than classroom training. For the remainder of their service, EIS officers are assigned to operational branches within the CDC or at state and local health departments around the country. Placement is determined via a highly competitive matching process. The CDC pairs EIS officers with a Public Health Advisor, forming a scientist (EIS officer) and operations (PHA) team. The EIS is a common recruiting pathway into the Public Health Service Commissioned Corps.

The EIS is the prototype for Field Epidemiology Training Programs (FETP), which operate in numerous countries with technical assistance provided by the CDC. However, attempts to establish FETPs in Indonesia, Hungary, Ivory Coast, and within the World Health Organization have failed due to insufficient long-term support.

== History of responses ==
Since the inception of the EIS, officers have been involved with treatment, eradication, and disease-control efforts for a variety of medically related crises. Below is an abridged timeline of their work.

- 1950s: The EIS worked on polio, lead poisoning, and Asian influenza
- 1960s: Cancer clusters, and smallpox
- 1970s: Legionnaires' disease, Ebola, and Reye syndrome
- 1980s: Toxic shock syndrome, birth defects, and HIV/AIDS
- 1990s: Tobacco, West Nile virus, and contaminated water
- 2000s: 2001 anthrax attacks, E. coli O157:H7, SARS, H1N1, and the aftermath of Hurricane Katrina
- 2010s: The aftermath of the Haiti earthquake, obesity, fungal meningitis, and Ebola
- 2020s: Zika virus, COVID-19 pandemic

== EIS conference ==
EIS officers attend an annual conference in Atlanta, Georgia, to present components of their work from the preceding year.

During the conference, the Alexander D. Langmuir Prize is awarded "to a current officer or first-year alumnus of the EIS for the best scientific publication. The award consists of a $100 cash prize, an engraved paperweight, a case of ale or beer redolent of the John Snow Pub in London, and an inscription on the permanent plaque at CDC."

A complete list of Langmuir Prize winners is included below:

Year	Article title	Publication	Author(s)
1966	Complications of Smallpox Vaccination: I. National Survey in the United States, 1963.	N Engl J Med 1967;276:125–32.	J.M. Neff, J.M. Lane, J.H. Pert, R. Moore, J.D. Millar, D.A. Henderson
1967	An Outbreak of Neuromyasthenia in a Kentucky Factory—The Possible Role of a Brief Exposure to Organic Mercury.	Am J Epidemiol 1967;86:756–64.	G. Miller, R. Chamberlin, W.M. McCormack
1968	Salmonellosis from Chicken Prepared in Commercial Rotisseries: Report of an Outbreak.	Am J Epidemiol 1969;90:429–37.	S.B. Werner, J. Allard, E.A. Ager
1969	Outbreak of Tick-Borne Relapsing Fever in Spokane County, Washington.	JAMA 1969;210:1045–50.	R.S. Thompson, W. Burgdorfer, R. Russell, B.J. Francis
1970	Tularemia Epidemic: Vermont, 1968—Forty-Seven Cases Linked to Contact with Muskrats.	N Engl J Med 1969;280:1253–60.	L.S. Young, D.S. Bicknell, B.G. Archer, et al.
1971	Tomato Juice-Associated Gastroenteritis, Washington and Oregon, 1969.	Am J Epidemiol 1972;96:219–26.	W.H. Barker Jr., V. Runte
1972	Salmonella Septicemia from Platelet Transfusions: Study of an Outbreak Traced to a Hematogenous Carrier of Salmonella cholerae-suis.	Ann Intern Med 1973;78: 633–41.	F.S. Rhame, R.K. Root, J.D. MacLowry, T.A. Dadisman, J.V. Bennett
1973	Outbreak of Typhoid Fever in Trinidad in 1971 Traced to a Commercial Ice Cream Product.	Am J Epidemiol 1974;100:150–7.	A. Taylor Jr., A. Santiago, A.Gonzales-Cortes, E.J. Gangarosa
1974	Oyster-Associated Hepatitis: Failure of Shellfish Certification Programs To Prevent Outbreaks.	JAMA 1975;233:1065–8.	B.L. Portnoy, P.A. Mackowiak, C.T. Caraway, J.A. Walker, T.W. McKinley, C.A. Klein Jr.
1975	Staphylococcal Food Poisoning Aboard a Commercial Aircraft.	Lancet 1975;2:595–9.	M.S. Eisenberg, K. Gaarslev, W. Brown, M. Horwitz, D. Hill
1976	Nursery Outbreak of Peritonitis with Pneumoperitoneum Probably Caused by Thermometer-Induced Rectal Perforation.	Am J Epidemiol 1976;104:632–44.	M.A. Horwitz, J.V. Bennett
1977	Epidemic Yersinia entercolitica Infection due to Contaminated Chocolate Milk.	N Engl J Med 1978;298:76–9.	R.E. Black, R.J. Jackson, T. Tsai, et al.
1978	Measles Vaccine Efficacy in Children Previously Vaccinated at 12 Months of Age.	Pediatrics 1978;62: 955–60.	J.S. Marks, T.J. Halpin, W.A. Orenstein
1979	An Outbreak of Legionnaires’ Disease Associated with a Contaminated Air-Conditioning Cooling Tower.	N Engl J Med 1980;302:365–70.	T.J. Dondero Jr., R.C. Rendtorff, G.F. Mallison, et al.
1979	Risk of Vascular Disease in Women: Smoking, Oral Contraceptives, Noncontraceptive Estrogens, and Other Factors.	JAMA 1979;242:1150–4.	D.B. Petitti, J.Wingerd, J. Pellegrin, et al.
1980	Injuries from the Wichita Falls Tornado: Implications for Prevention.	Science 1980;207:734–8.	R.I. Glass, R.B. Craven, D.J. Bregman, et al.
1981	Respiratory Irritation due to Carpet Shampoo: Two Outbreaks.	Environ Int 1982;8:337–41.	K. Kreiss, M.G. Gonzalez, K.L. Conright, A.R. Scheere
1981	Toxic-Shock Syndrome in Menstruating Women: Association with Tampon Use and Staphylococcus aureus and Clinical Features in 52 Cases.	N Engl J Med 1980;303:1436–42.	K.N. Shands, G.P. Schmid, B.B. Dan, et al.
1982	Risk Factors for Heatstroke: A Case-Control Study.	JAMA 1982;247:3332–6.	E.M. Kilbourne, K. Choi, T.S. Jones, S.B. Thacker
1983	Epidemic Listeriosis C—Evidence for Transmission by Food.	N Engl J Med 1983;308:203–6.	W.F. Schlech III, P.M. Lavigne, R.A. Bortolussi, et al.
1984	Unexplained Deaths in a Children's Hospital: An Epidemiologic Assessment.	N Engl J Med 1985;313: 211–6.	J.W. Buehler, L.F. Smith, E.M. Wallace, C.W. Heath, R. Kusiak, J.L. Herndon.
1984	Medication Errors with Inhalant Epinephrine Mimicking an Epidemic of Neonatal Sepsis.	N Engl J Med 1984;310:166–70.	S.L. Solomon, E.M. Wallace, E.L. Ford-Jones, et al.
1985	The Use and Efficacy of Child-Restraint Devices: The Tennessee Experience, 1982 and 1983.	JAMA 1984;252:2571–5.	M.D. Decker, M.J. Dewey, R.H. Hutcheson Jr., W.S. Schaffner
1986	The Role of Parvovirus B19 in Aplastic Crisis and Erythema Infectiosum (Fifth Disease).	J Infect Dis 1986;154:383–93.	T.L. Chorba, P. Coccia, R.C. Holman, et al.
1987	Oral Contraceptives and Cervical Cancer Risk in Costa Rica: Detection Bias or Causal Association?	JAMA 1988;259:59–64.	K.L. Irwin, L. Rosero-Bixby, M.W. Oberle, et al.
1988	A Day-Care–Based Case-Control Efficacy Study of Haemophilus influenzae B Polysaccharide Vaccine.	JAMA 1988;260:1413–8.	L.H. Harrison, C. Broome, A.W. Hightower, et al.
1989	Group A Meningococcal Carriage in Travelers Returning from Saudi Arabia.	JAMA 1988;260:2686–9.	P.S. Moore, L.H. Harrison, E.E. Telzak, G.W. Ajello, C.V. Broome
1989	Transmission of Plasmodium vivax Malaria in San Diego County, California, 1986.	Am J Trop Med Hyg 1990;42:3–9.	Y.A. Maldonado, B.L. Nahlen, R.R. Roberta, et al.
1990	An Outbreak of Surgical Wound Infections due to Group A Streptococcus Carried on the Scalp.	N Engl J Med 1990;323:968–72.	T.D. Mastro, T.A. Farley, J.A. Elliott, et al.
1991	An Investigation of the Cause of the EosinophiliaMyalgia Syndrome Associated with Tryptophan Use.	N Engl J Med 1990;323:357–65.	E.A. Belongia, C.W. Hedberg, G.J. Gleich, et al.
1992	An Outbreak of Multidrug-Resistant Tuberculosis Among Hospitalized Patients with the Acquired Immunodeficiency Syndrome.	N Engl J Med 1992;326:1514–21.	B.R. Edlin, J.I. Tokars, M.H. Grieco, et al.
1993	Comparison of Prevention Strategies for Neonatal Group B Streptococcal Infection: A Population-Based Economic Analysis.	JAMA 1993;270:1442–8.	J.C. Mohle-Boetani, A. Schuchat, B.D. Plikaytis, J.D. Smith, C.V. Broome
1993	Retrospective Study of the Impact of Lead-Based Hazard Remediation on Children's Blood Lead Levels in St. Louis, Missouri.	Am J Epidemiol 1994;139:1016–26.	C. Staes, T. Matte, C.B. Copley, D. Flanders, S. Binder
1994	A Massive Outbreak in Milwaukee of Cryptosporidium Infection Transmitted Through the Public Water Supply.	N Engl J Med 1994;331:161–7.	W.R. Mac Kenzie, N.J. Hoxie, M.E. Proctor, et al.
1995	A Multistate Outbreak of Escherichia coli 0157:H7-Associated Bloody Diarrhea and Hemolytic Uremic Syndrome from Hamburgers: The Washington Experience.	JAMA 1994;272:1349–53.	B.P. Bell, M. Goldoft, P.M. Griffin, et al.
1996	A Multistate Outbreak of Salmonella Enteritidis Infections Associated with Consumption of Schwan's Ice Cream.	N Engl J Med 1996;334:1281–6	T.W. Hennessy, C.W. Hedberg, L. Slutsker, et al.
1996	Passenger to Passenger Transmission of Mycobacterium tuberculosis Aboard Commercial Aircraft During Transoceanic Travel.	N Engl J Med 1996;334:993–8.	T.A. Kenyon, S.E. Valway, W.W. Ihle, I.M. Onorato
1997	Epidemic Meningococcal Disease and Tobacco Smoke: A Risk Factor Study in the Pacific Northwest.	Pediatr Infect Dis J 1997;16:979–83.	M.A. Fisher, K. Hedberg, P. Cardosi, et al.
1998	Suicide After Natural Disasters.	N Engl J Med 1998;338:373–8.	E.G. Krug, M. Kresnow, J.P. Peddicord, et al.
1999	Legalized Physician-Assisted Suicide in Oregon—The First Year's Experience.	N Engl J Med 1999;340:577–83.	A.E. Chin, K. Hedberg, G.K. Higginson, D.W. Fleming
2000	Infantile Hypertrophic Pyloric Stenosis After Pertussis Prophylaxis with Erythromycin: A Case Review and Cohort Study.	Lancet 1999;354:2101–5.	M.A. Honein, L.J. Paulozzi, I.M. Himelright, et al.
2001	Salmonella Typhimurium Infections Transmitted by Chlorine-Pretreated Clover Sprout Seeds.	Am J Epidemiol 2001;154:1020–8.	J.T. Brooks, S. Rowe, P. Shillam, et al.
2002	Serratia liquefaciens Bloodstream Infections from Contamination of Epoetin Alfa at a Hemodialysis Center.	N Engl J Med 2001;344:1491–7.	L.A. Grohskopf, V.R. Roth, D.R. Feikin, et al.
2003	Transmission of West Nile Virus from an Organ Donor to Four Transplant Recipients.	N Engl J Med 2003;348:2196–203.	M. Iwamoto, D.B. Jernigan, A. Guasch, et al., the West Nile Virus in Transplant Recipients Investigation Team
2004	Risk of Bacterial Meningitis in Children with Cochlear Implants.	N Engl J Med 2003;349:435–45.	J. Reefhuis, M.A. Honein, C.G. Whitney, et al.
2005	Changes in Invasive Pneumococcal Disease Among HIV-Infected Adults Living in the Era of Childhood Pneumococcal Immunization.	Ann Intern Med 2006;144:1–9.	B.L. Flannery, R.T. Heffernan, L.H. Harrison, et al.
2006	Case-Control Study of an Acute Aflatoxicosis Outbreak, Kenya, 2004.	Environ Health Perspect 005;113:1779–83.	E. Azziz-Baumgartner, K.Y. Lindblade, K. Gieseker, et al., and the Aflatoxin Investigative Group
2007	Methamphetamine Use Is Independently Associated with Risky Sexual Behaviors and Adolescent Pregnancy.	J Sch Health 2008;78:641–8.	L.B. Zapata, S.D Hillis, P.M. Marchbanks, K.M. Curtis, R. Lowry
2008	Characteristics of Perpetrators in Homicide-Followedby-Suicide Incidents: National Violent Death Reporting System—17 US States, 2003–2005.	Am J Epidemiol 2008;168:1056–64.	J. Logan, H.A. Hill, A.E. Crosby, D.L. Karch, J.D. Barnes, K.M. Lubell
2009	Epidemiologic Investigation of Immune-Mediated Polyradiculoneuropathy Among Abattoir Workers Exposed to Porcine Brain.	PLoS ONE. 2009;5:e9782.	S.M. Holzbauer, A.S. DeVries, J.J. Sejvar, et al.
2010	Increasing Compliance with Mass Drug Administration Programs for Lymphatic Filariasis in Orissa, India, 2009: Impact of an Education and a Lymphedema Management Program.	PLoS Negl Trop Dis. 2010;201;4:e728.	P.T. Cantey, J. Rout, G. Rao, J. Williamson, L.M. Fox
2011	Effect of Rotavirus Vaccine on Healthcare Utilization for Diarrhea in US Children.	N Engl J Med 2011;365;12:1108–17.	J. Cortes, A. Curns, J. Tate, M. Cortese, M. Patel, F. Zhou, U. Parashar
2012	Multistate Outbreak of Escherichia coli O157:H7 Infections Associated with In-Store Sampling of a Raw-Milk Gouda Cheese, 2010.		J. McCollum, N. Williams, S. W. Beam, et al.
2013	Necrotizing Cutaneous Mucormycosis After a Tornado in Joplin, Missouri, in 2011.	N Engl J Med 2012;367;2214–25.	R. Fanfair, K. Benedict, J. Bos, et al.
2014	Raccoon Rabies Virus Variant Transmission Through Solid Organ Transplantation.	JAMA 2013;310:398–407.	N.M. Vora, S.V. Basavaraju, KA Feldman, et al.
2015	New Delhi metallo-beta-lactamase-producing carbapenem-resistant E. coli associated with exposure to duodenoscopes.	JAMA. 2014;312(14):1447-1455	L. Epstein, J. Hunter, M.A. Arwaddy, et al.
2016	Exposure to Advertisements and Electronic Cigarette: Use Among U.S. Middle and High School Students.		T. Singh, I.T. Agaku, R.A. Arrazola, K.L. Marynak, L.J. Neff, I.T. Rolle, B.A. King
2017	Geospatial analysis of household spread of Ebola virus in a quarantined village – Sierra Leone, 2014	Epi and Inf 2017;145(14):2921-2929.	B. L. Gleason, S. Foster, G. E. Wilt, et al.
2018	Educational Disabilities Among Children Born with Neonatal Abstinence Syndrome.	Educational Disabilities Among Children Born with Neonatal Abstinence Syndrome.	M.A. Fill, A.M. Miller, R.H. Wilkinson
2019	Homelessness and Hepatitis A — San Diego County, 2016–2018.	Clin Infect Dis 2020;71(1):14–21.	C.M. Peak, S.S. Stous, J.M. Healy, et al.
2020	Factors Associated with Candida auris Colonization and Transmission in Skilled Nursing Facilities with Ventilator Units, New York, 2016-2018.	Clin Infect Dis 2021;72(11):e753–e760.	J. Rossow, B. Ostrowsky, E. Adams, et al.
2021	Presymptomatic SARS-CoV-2 Infections and Transmission in a Skilled Nursing Facility.	N Engl J Med. 2020;382(22):2081–2090.	M.M. Arons, K.M. Hatfield, S.C. Reddy, et al.
2022	Multistate Outbreak of Spinal and Disseminated Tuberculosis Caused by Surgical Implantation of a Bone Allograft Product.		N. Schwartz, A. Hernandez-Romieu
2022	Association Between 3 Doses of mRNA COVID-19 Vaccine and Symptomatic Infection Caused by the SARS-CoV-2 Omicron and Delta Variants.	JAMA. 2022 Feb 15;327(7):639-651.	E.K. Accorsi, A. Britton, Fleming-Dutra KE, et al.
2023	School District Prevention Policies and Risk of COVID-19 Among In-Person K—12 Educators, Wisconsin, 2021.	Am J Public Health 2022;112(12):1791-1799.	Peter M. DeJonge, Ian W. Pray, Ronald Gangnon, et al.

== In popular culture ==
In the 2011 film Contagion, the character Doctor Erin Mears (portrayed by Kate Winslet) is a physician and investigator with the Epidemic Intelligence Service who was tasked by the CDC to discover the origin of a highly contagious and deadly virus known as MEV-1 which was rapidly spreading throughout the world following initial outbreaks in Kowloon, Hong Kong and Minneapolis, Minnesota.
