= Cory Booker =

American politician (born 1969)

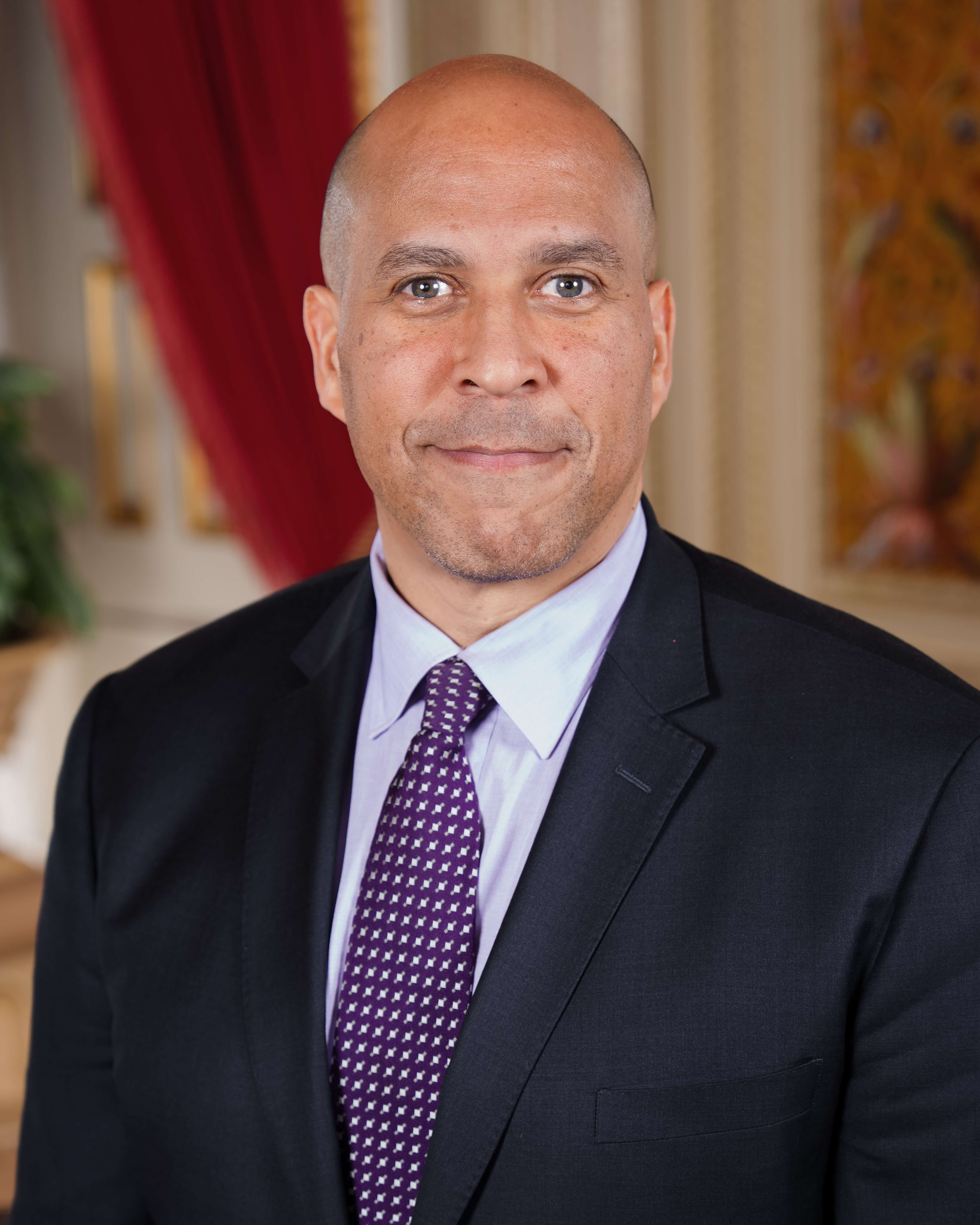
- Official portrait, 2025

United States Senator from New Jersey
- Incumbent
- Assumed office October 31, 2013 Serving with Andy Kim
- Preceded by: Jeffrey Chiesa

Chair of the Senate Democratic Strategic Communications Committee
- Incumbent
- Assumed office January 3, 2025
- Leader: Chuck Schumer
- Vice Chair: Tina Smith
- Preceded by: Debbie Stabenow (Policy and Communications)

38th Mayor of Newark
- In office July 1, 2006 – October 31, 2013
- Preceded by: Sharpe James
- Succeeded by: Luis Quintana

Member of the Newark Municipal Council from the Central Ward
- In office July 1, 1998 – June 30, 2002
- Preceded by: George Branch
- Succeeded by: Charles Bell

Personal details
- Born: Cory Anthony Booker; April 27, 1969 (age 57) Washington, D.C., U.S.
- Party: Democratic
- Spouse: Alexis Lewis (m. 2025)
- Relatives: RuPaul (distant cousin)
- Education: Stanford University (BA, MA); Queen's College, Oxford (MA); Yale University (JD)
- Website: Senate website Campaign website
- Football career

No. 81
- Position: Tight end

Personal information
- Listed height: 6 ft 4 in (1.93 m)
- Listed weight: 220 lb (100 kg)

Career information
- High school: Northern Valley Regional
- College: Stanford Cardinal

Awards and highlights
- USA Today All-USA High School Football Team (1986)
- Booker's voice Booker speaking about public defenders Recorded March 16, 2023

Cory Anthony Booker (born April 27, 1969) is an American politician and lawyer serving as the senior United States senator from New Jersey, a seat he has held since 2013. A member of the Democratic Party, Booker is the first African-American U.S. senator from New Jersey. He was the 38th mayor of Newark from 2006 to 2013, and served on the Municipal Council of Newark for the Central Ward from 1998 to 2002.

Booker was born in Washington, D.C., and raised in Harrington Park, New Jersey. He attended Stanford University, receiving a BA in 1991 and a master's degree a year later. He attended Queen's College, Oxford, on a Rhodes Scholarship before attending Yale Law School. He won an upset victory for a seat on the Municipal Council of Newark in 1998, staging a 10-day hunger strike and briefly living in a tent to draw attention to urban development issues in the city. He ran for mayor in 2002 but lost to incumbent Sharpe James. He ran again in 2006 and defeated Deputy Mayor Ronald Rice. Booker's first term saw the doubling of affordable housing under development and the reduction of the city budget deficit from $180 million to $73 million. He was reelected in 2010.

Booker was elected to the U.S. Senate in New Jersey's 2013 special election and reelected in 2014, 2020, and 2026. He became New Jersey's senior senator when Bob Menendez resigned on August 20, 2024.

Booker became the first senator to ever testify against another senator during attorney general nominee Jeff Sessions's 2017 confirmation hearing. Booker ran for the Democratic nomination in the 2020 U.S. presidential election, but suspended his campaign on January 13, 2020. From March 31 to April 1, 2025, he delivered the longest speech in U.S. Senate history, lasting 25 hours and five minutes, in protest of the second presidency of Donald Trump.

== Early life and education ==
Booker was born in Washington, D.C.; he grew up in Harrington Park, New Jersey, 20 miles (32 km) northeast of Newark. His parents, Carolyn Rose (née Jordan) and Cary Alfred Booker (1936–2013), were among the first black IBM executives. Booker has said that he was raised in a religious household and that he and his family attended a small African Methodist Episcopal Church in New Jersey. Booker has Sierra Leonean ancestry, which he learned when featured on the PBS television program Finding Your Roots.

Booker graduated from Northern Valley Regional High School at Old Tappan, where he played varsity football and was named to the 1986 USA Today All-USA high school football team. He graduated from Stanford University with a Bachelor of Arts in political science in 1991 and a Master of Arts in sociology in 1992. He played football for Stanford at tight end and was teammates with Brad Muster and Ed McCaffrey, making the All-Pacific-10 Academic team. He was elected senior class president. In addition, Booker ran The Bridge Peer Counseling Center, a student-run crisis hotline, and organized help from Stanford students for youth in East Palo Alto, California.

Booker was awarded a Rhodes Scholarship to study at The Queen's College, Oxford, earning a degree in United States history in 1994. At Oxford, Booker served as president of the Oxford University L'Chaim Society and became a close friend of Shmuley Boteach. He obtained his Juris Doctor in 1997 from Yale Law School and operated free legal clinics for low-income residents of New Haven, Connecticut. At Yale, Booker was a founding member of the Chai Society (now Shabtai). He also was a Big Brother with Big Brothers Big Sisters of America and active in the National Black Law Students Association.

== Municipal Council of Newark ==
Contemplating advocacy work and a run for city council in Newark after graduating from law school, Booker lived in the city during his final year at Yale. After graduation, he served as staff attorney for the Urban Justice Center in New York and program coordinator of the Newark Youth Project. In 1998, Booker won an upset victory for a seat on the Municipal Council of Newark, defeating four-term incumbent George Branch. To draw attention to the problems of open-air drug dealing and associated violence, he went on a 10-day hunger strike, living in a tent and later in a motor home near drug-dealing areas of the city. Booker also proposed council initiatives that affected housing, young people, law and order, and the efficiency and transparency of City Hall, but was regularly outvoted.

== Mayor of Newark ==
=== Mayoral campaigns ===
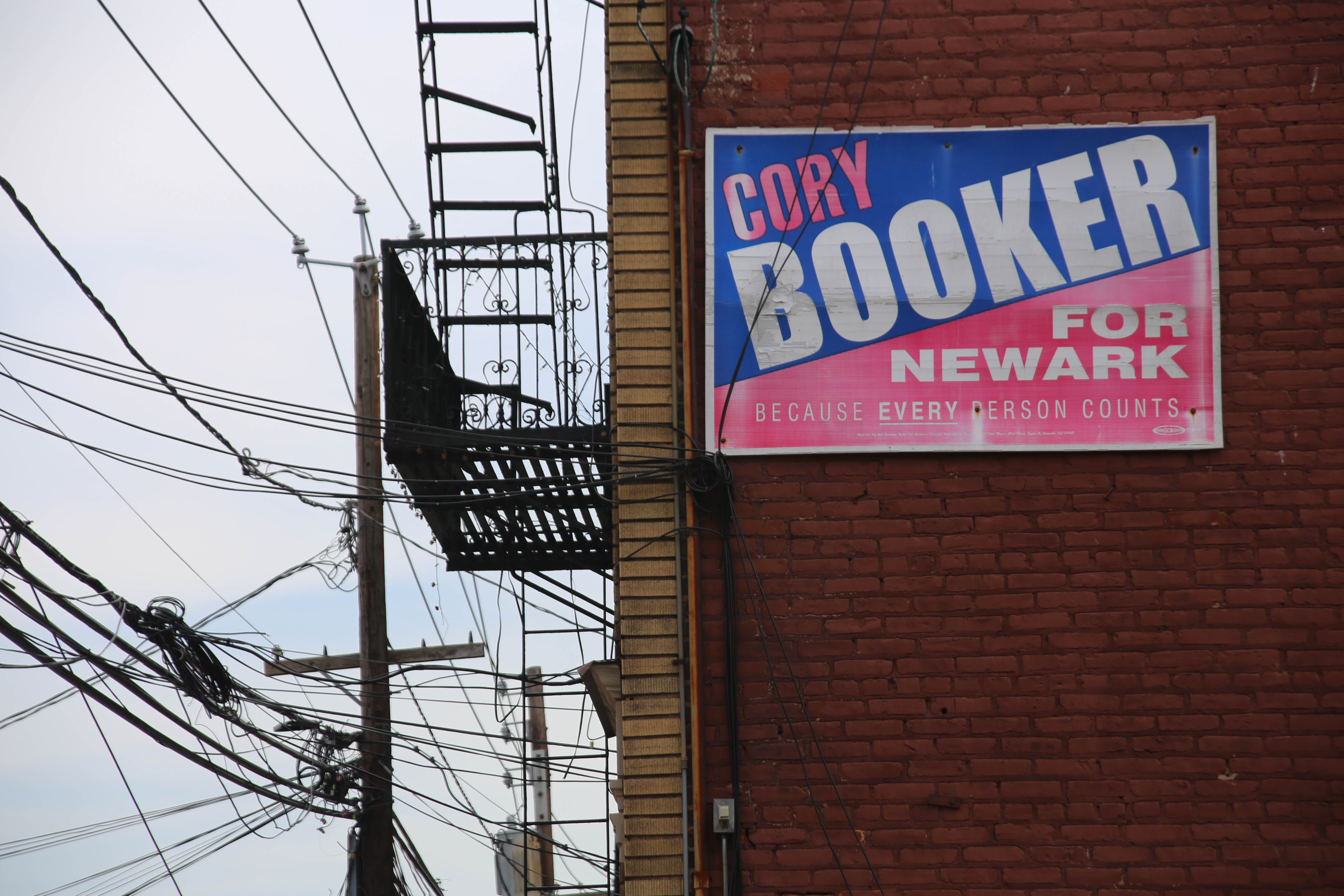
Cory Booker for Newark campaign sign

==== 2002 election ====
On January 9, 2002, Booker announced his campaign for mayor of Newark rather than running for reelection as councilman. That pitted him against longtime incumbent Sharpe James. James, who had easily won election four consecutive times, saw Booker as a real threat and responded with mudslinging. At one campaign event, James called him "a Republican who took money from the KKK [and] Taliban ... [who's] collaborating with the Jews to take over Newark." In the campaign James's supporters questioned Booker's suburban background, calling him a carpetbagger who was "not black enough" to understand the city. Booker lost the election, garnering 47% of the vote to James's 53%. The Oscar-nominated documentary Street Fight chronicles the election.

During the campaign, Booker founded the nonprofit organization Newark Now.

==== 2006 election ====
On February 11, 2006, Booker announced that he would run for mayor again. Although James filed paperwork to run for reelection, he announced shortly thereafter that he would instead cancel his bid to focus on his work as a state senator, a position to which he was elected in 1999. At James's urging, Deputy Mayor Ronald Rice decided to run for mayor. Booker's campaign, raising over $6 million, outspent Rice's 25 to 1, for which Rice attacked him. Booker, in turn, attacked Rice as a "political crony" of James. Booker won the May 9 election with 72% of the vote. His slate of city council candidates, known as the "Booker Team", swept the council elections, giving Booker firm leadership of the city government.

==== 2010 election ====
On April 3, 2010, Booker announced his candidacy for reelection. At his announcement event, he remarked that a "united government" was crucial to progress, knowing his supporters in the city council faced tough reelections. Heavily favored to win, Booker faced former judge and Essex County prosecutor Clifford J. Minor and two lesser-known candidates. On May 11, Booker was reelected with 59% of the vote.

=== Tenure ===
Before taking office as mayor, Booker sued the James administration, seeking to terminate cut-rate land deals favoring two redevelopment agencies that had contributed to James's campaigns and listed James as a member of their advisory boards. Booker argued that the state's "pay-to-play" laws had been violated and that the land deals would cost the city more than $15 million in lost revenue. Specifically, Booker referenced a parcel at Broad and South Streets that would generate only $87,000 under the proposed land deals yet was valued at $3.7 million under then-current market rates. On June 20, 2006, Superior Court Judge Patricia Costello ruled in Booker's favor.

In late June 2006, before Booker took office, New Jersey investigators foiled a plot to assassinate him led by Bloods gang leaders inside four New Jersey state prisons. The motive for the plot was unclear, but was described variously as a response to the acrimonious campaign and to Booker's campaign promises to take a harder line on crime.

==== First term ====
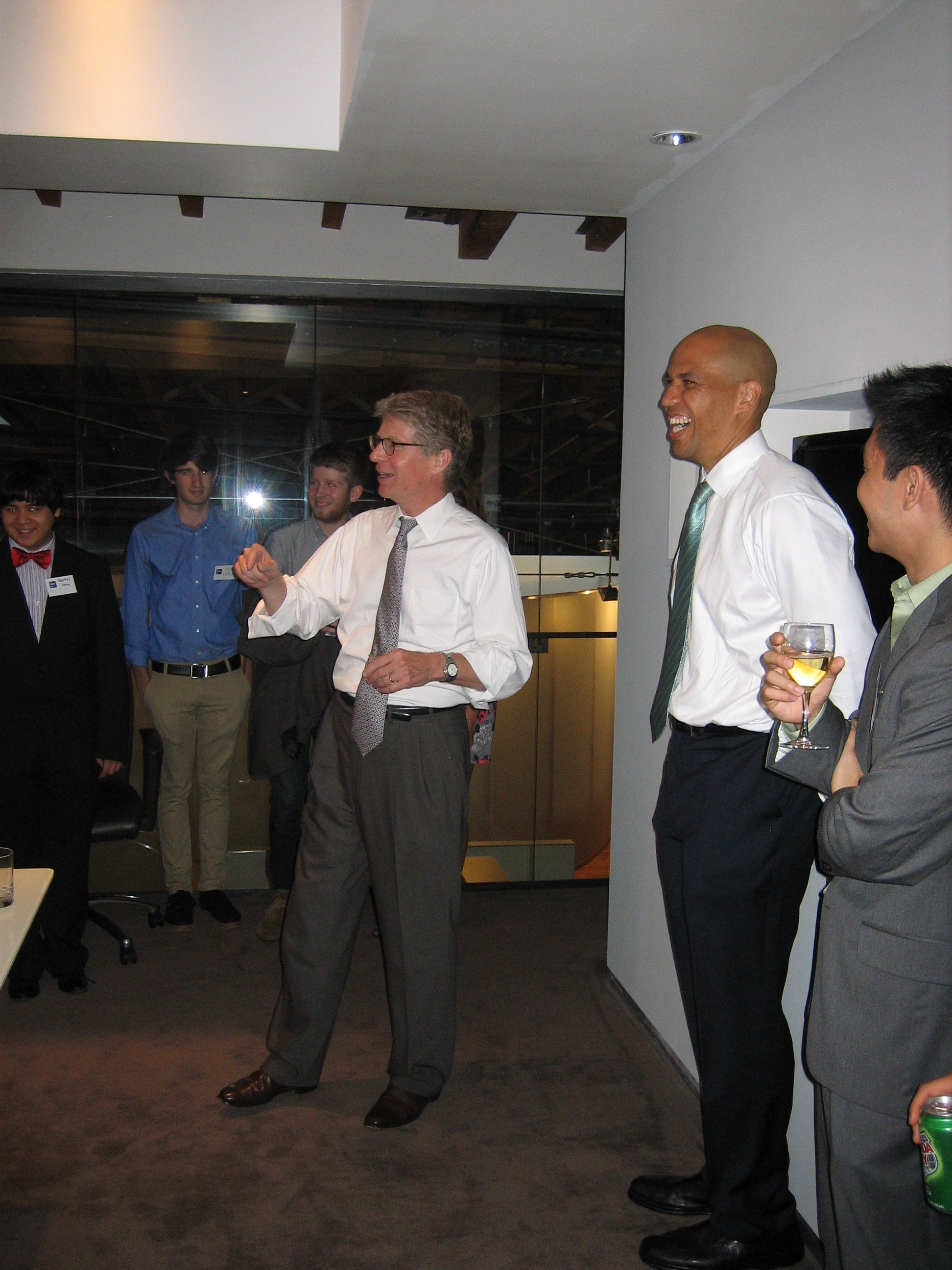
Booker at a fundraiser with New York County District Attorney candidate Cyrus Vance Jr. in 2009

Booker took office as mayor of Newark on July 1, 2006. After his first week in office, he announced a 100-day plan to implement reforms. The proposed changes included increasing police forces, ending background checks for many city jobs to help former offenders find employment in the city, refurbishing police stations, improving city services, and expanding summer youth programs.

One of Booker's first priorities was to reduce the city's crime rate. In furtherance of this, he appointed former deputy commissioner of operations of the New York City Police Department Garry McCarthy director of the Newark Police Department. Crime reduction was such a central concern of Booker's administration that he and his security team were known to personally patrol Newark's streets until as late as 4 a.m.

Booker was a member of the Mayors Against Illegal Guns Coalition, a bipartisan group with a stated goal of "making the public safer by getting illegal guns off the streets". In October 2009, the Brady Center to Prevent Gun Violence gave him the Sarah Brady Visionary Award for his work in reducing gun violence. During his mayoralty, crime dropped significantly in Newark, which led the nation in violent crime reduction from 2006 to 2008. March 2010 marked Newark's first murder-free month in over 44 years, although murder and overall crime rates began to rise again after 2008. In addition to his crime-lowering initiatives, Booker's first term saw the doubling of affordable housing under development, quadrupling of the amount under pre-development, and the reduction of the city budget deficit from $180 million to $73 million..

After taking office, Booker voluntarily reduced his own salary twice, first by 8% early in his first year as mayor. He also raised the salaries of many city workers. But his administration imposed one-day-a-month furloughs for all non-uniformed employees from July through December 2010, as well as 2% pay cuts for managers and directors earning more than $100,000 a year. In 2008 and 2009, the City of Newark received the Government Finance Officers Association's Distinguished Budget Presentation Award. In an effort to make government more accessible, Booker held regular open office hours during which city residents could meet with him to discuss their concerns. In 2010, Booker was among the finalists for the World Mayor prize, ultimately placing seventh; he was also an unsuccessful candidate for the 2012 award. In March 2010, Booker won a Shorty Award in the government category for having the best microblog.

In July 2010, Booker attended a dinner at a conference in Sun Valley, Idaho, where he was seated with Facebook founder Mark Zuckerberg. Zuckerberg, who had no known ties to Newark, announced in September 2010 that he was donating $100 million to the Newark school system. According to The New York Times, Booker and Zuckerberg continued their conversation about Booker's plans for Newark. The initial gift was made to start a foundation for education. The gift was formally announced when Booker, New Jersey Governor Chris Christie, and Zuckerberg appeared together on The Oprah Winfrey Show. Some considered the timing of Zuckerberg's donation a move for damage control to his image, as it was announced on the opening day of the movie The Social Network, a film that painted an unflattering portrait of Zuckerberg. But on her show, Winfrey told the audience that Zuckerberg and Booker had been in talks for months, had planned the announcement for the month before, and that she and Booker had to force Zuckerberg to put his name on the donation, which he had wanted to make anonymously.

On October 10, 2010, Booker established Let's Move! Newark as part of First Lady Michelle Obama's national Let's Move! initiative against childhood obesity.

Booker gained national attention on December 28, 2010, when a constituent asked him on Twitter to send someone to her elderly father's house to shovel his driveway because he was about to attempt to do it himself. Booker responded by tweeting, "I will do it myself; where does he live?" Other people volunteered, including one person who offered his help on Twitter, and 20 minutes later Booker and some volunteers showed up and shoveled the man's driveway.

==== Second term ====
In October 2011, Booker expanded the Let's Move! Newark program to include Let's Move! Newark: Our Power, a four-month fitness challenge for Newark public school students run by public health advocate Jeff Halevy.

On April 12, 2012, Booker saved a woman from a house fire, suffering smoke inhalation and second-degree burns on his hands in the process. Newark Fire Chief John Centanni said that Booker's actions possibly saved the woman's life. After Hurricane Sandy destroyed much of New Jersey's and New York's shoreline areas in late October 2012, Booker invited Newarkers without electricity and similar services to eat and sleep in his home. In February 2013, responding to a Twitter post, Booker helped a nervous constituent propose to his girlfriend. Booker rescued a dog from freezing temperatures in January 2013 and another dog that had been abandoned in a cage in July 2013.

On November 20, 2012, a melee occurred at a Newark City Council meeting Booker attended. The nine-seat council was to vote on the successor to the seat vacated by newly elected U.S. Representative Donald Payne Jr. Booker's opponents on the council, including Ras Baraka, sought to appoint John Sharpe James, son of former mayor Sharpe James, while Booker and his supporters favored Shanique Speight. Booker attended the meeting in case there was a lack of quorum or a tie vote, as state law would allow him to cast a deciding vote. After acting council president Anibal Ramos Jr. refused Baraka an opportunity to address the council, Baraka and two other council members walked away in protest. Booker cast the deciding vote for Speight. Supporters of James stormed the stage and were held back by riot police, who eventually used pepper spray on some members of the crowd. Baraka later blamed Booker for inciting the disturbance. Booker refused to comment to the media after the vote.

In December 2012, after discussions with a constituent about New Jersey's Supplemental Nutrition Assistance Program (SNAP), Booker began a weeklong challenge attempting to live on a food budget of $30 per week—the amount he said that New Jersey paid SNAP recipients. When critics noted that the very name of the SNAP program shows that it is intended to "supplement" an individual's food budget, not be its sole source, Booker replied that his aim was to spark a discussion about the reality that many Americans rely solely on food stamps to survive.

=== Public opinion polling ===
Throughout Booker's mayoralty, Fairleigh Dickinson University's public opinion poll PublicMind asked New Jersey residents whether they had heard of Booker and whether they had a favorable or unfavorable opinion of him. The results were:

September 2008

- Name recognition: 56%
- Favorable opinion: 32%
- Unfavorable opinion: 8%

April 2009

- Name recognition: 62%
- Favorable opinion: 39%
- Unfavorable opinion: 10%

May 2010

- Name recognition: 66%
- Favorable opinion: 42%
- Unfavorable opinion: 6%

May 2012

- Name recognition: 67%
- Favorable opinion: 47%
- Unfavorable opinion: 6%

January 2013

- Name recognition: 75%
- Favorable opinion: 66%
- Unfavorable opinion: 13%

March 2014

- Name recognition: 88%
- Favorable opinion: 47%
- Unfavorable opinion: 23%

=== Legacy ===
Booker's mayoralty and celebrity drew substantial media attention to Newark. While he had high ratings from Newarkers, his legacy has received mixed reviews. During his tenure, millions of dollars were invested in downtown development, but underemployment and high murder rates continue to characterize many of the city's neighborhoods. Despite legal challenges initiated during his term, Newark Public Schools remained under state control for nearly 20 years. Newark received $32 million in emergency state aid in 2011 and 2012, requiring a memorandum of understanding between Newark and the state that obligated the city to request and the state to approve appointments to City Hall administrative positions.

While mayor, Booker claimed in an interview that Newark's unemployment rate had fallen by two percentage points. PolitiFact rated the claim "false" because he used data that had not been seasonally adjusted; the adjusted rate was 0.7 percentage points.

== U.S. Senate ==
=== Elections ===
==== 2013 ====
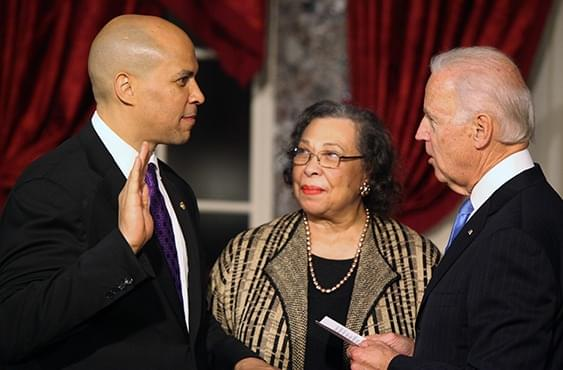
Booker's swearing in as senator, with his mother and Vice President Joe Biden, 2013

On December 20, 2012, Booker announced that he would explore running for the U.S. Senate seat then occupied by Frank Lautenberg in the 2014 election, ending speculation that he would challenge Governor Chris Christie in the 2013 gubernatorial election. On January 11, 2013, Booker filed papers to form a campaign committee without announcing whether he would run. About a month later, Lautenberg—then 89 years old—announced that he would not seek reelection in 2014.

On June 3, Lautenberg died of viral pneumonia; five days later, Booker announced his intention to run for Lautenberg's seat in a 2013 special election. Booker announced his candidacy at two events, one in Newark and the other in Willingboro.

On August 13, 2013, Booker was declared the winner of the Democratic primary, with approximately 59% of the vote. On October 16, he defeated Republican Steve Lonegan in the general election, 54.9% to 44.0%. Booker was the first African-American to be elected to the Senate since Barack Obama in 2004. The night before his victory, he visited the gravesite of Rabbi Menachem M. Schneerson, offering prayers and lighting a vigil candle in memory of his father.

Booker resigned as mayor of Newark on October 30, and on October 31 was sworn in as the junior U.S. senator from New Jersey. He is the first African-American U.S. senator from New Jersey.

==== 2014 ====
On January 9, 2014, Brian D. Goldberg, a West Orange resident and New Jersey businessman, announced that he would seek the Republican nomination for U.S. Senate. On January 27, 2014, Freehold Township businessman Richard J. "Rich" Pezzullo announced his candidacy for the Republican nomination. Pezzullo had run for the US Senate in 1996 as the Conservative Party candidate. On February 4, 2014, conservative political consultant Jeff Bell announced his bid for the nomination. Bell was the Republican Party nominee for U.S. Senate in 1978. Ramapo College professor Murray Sabrin, who ran for the Senate in 2000 and 2008, announced his candidacy on February 13.

Bell won the Republican primary and received support from the conservative American Principles Fund, which ran a direct-mail operation costing over $80,000, and the National Organization for Marriage, an organization opposing same-sex marriage, which paid for $6,000 of automated calling. Booker defeated Bell in the general election with 55.8% of the vote to Bell's 42.4%.

==== 2020 ====
In his reelection campaign, Booker faced Republican nominee Rik Mehta, a pharmaceutical executive and attorney. The election was primarily conducted by mail-in ballots, as mandated by the New Jersey Legislature in response to the COVID-19 pandemic. Booker and Mehta participated in a virtual debate sponsored by the New Jersey Globe, in which they sparred over issues including the Trump presidency, COVID-19 lockdowns, the nomination of Amy Coney Barrett to the Supreme Court, and systemic racism.

In the November 3 general election, Booker defeated Mehta, 57%–41%.

==== 2026 ====
Booker filed for reelection in 2026. He was nominated without Democratic opposition for a third term and defeated Republican nominee Justin Murphy in the general election.

=== Tenure ===
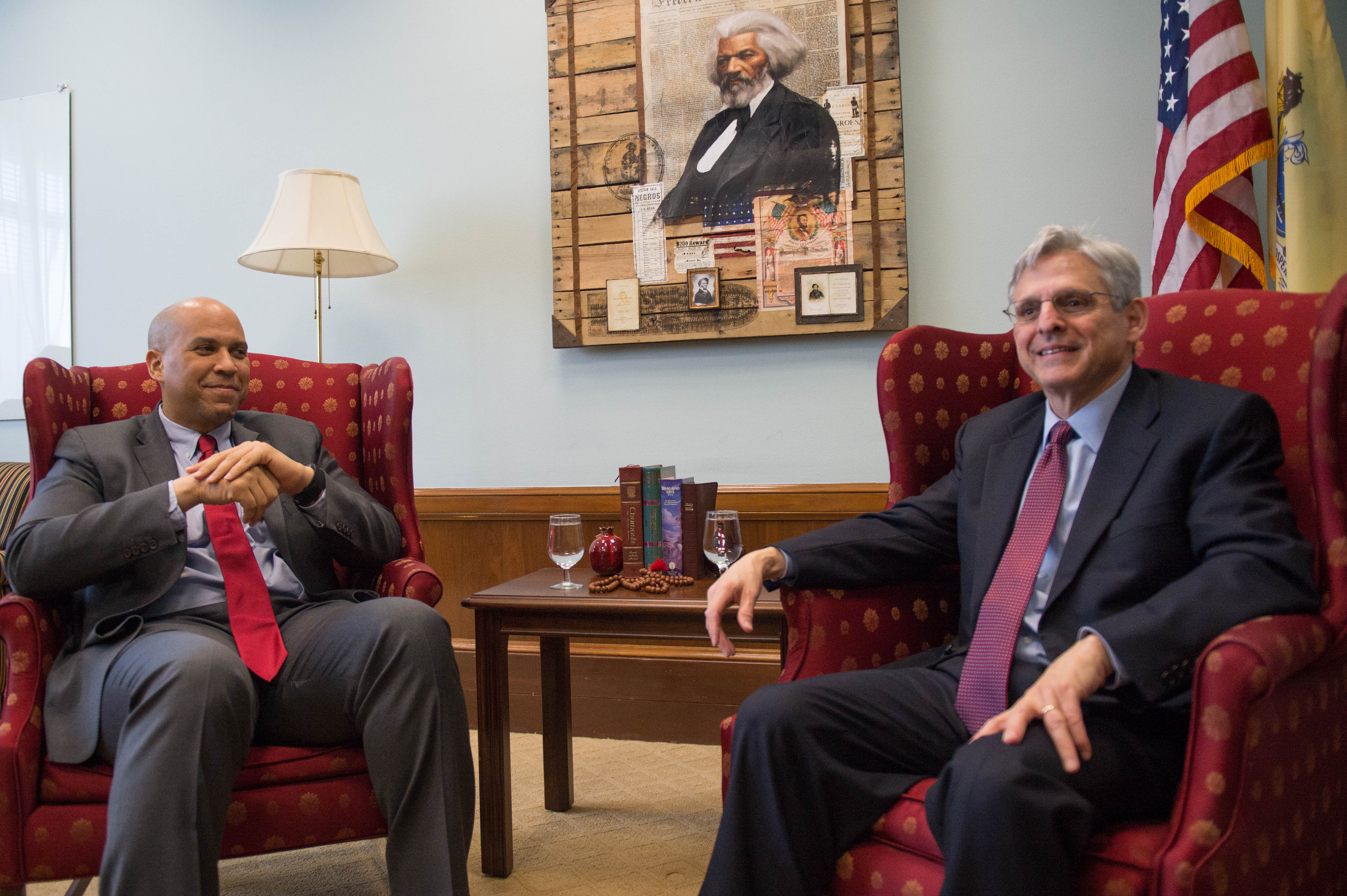
Booker with Judge Merrick Garland, 2016

In November 2013, Booker co-sponsored and voted for the Employment Non-Discrimination Act. In December 2013, he was one of the original cosponsors of Bob Menéndez's Nuclear Weapon Free Iran Act of 2013, which would toughen sanctions against Iran. He also voted for the National Defense Authorization Act for Fiscal Year 2014 and the Bipartisan Budget Act of 2013. In January 2014, he cosponsored the Respect for Marriage Act. In February 2014, Booker voted against the Federal Agriculture Reform and Risk Management Act of 2013. In March, Booker pledged to meet with each of his Republican colleagues in the Senate in order to find common ground, and was spotted having dinner with Senator Ted Cruz in Washington.

Leading up to the 2016 presidential election, Booker endorsed Hillary Clinton for the Democratic nomination. He was considered a potential vice-presidential candidate during the primary and as the general election began, though he said on June 16 that he was not being vetted. After the election, in which Donald Trump defeated Clinton, Booker testified on January 11, 2017, against attorney general nominee Jeff Sessions, the first instance of a sitting senator testifying against another during a cabinet position confirmation hearing.

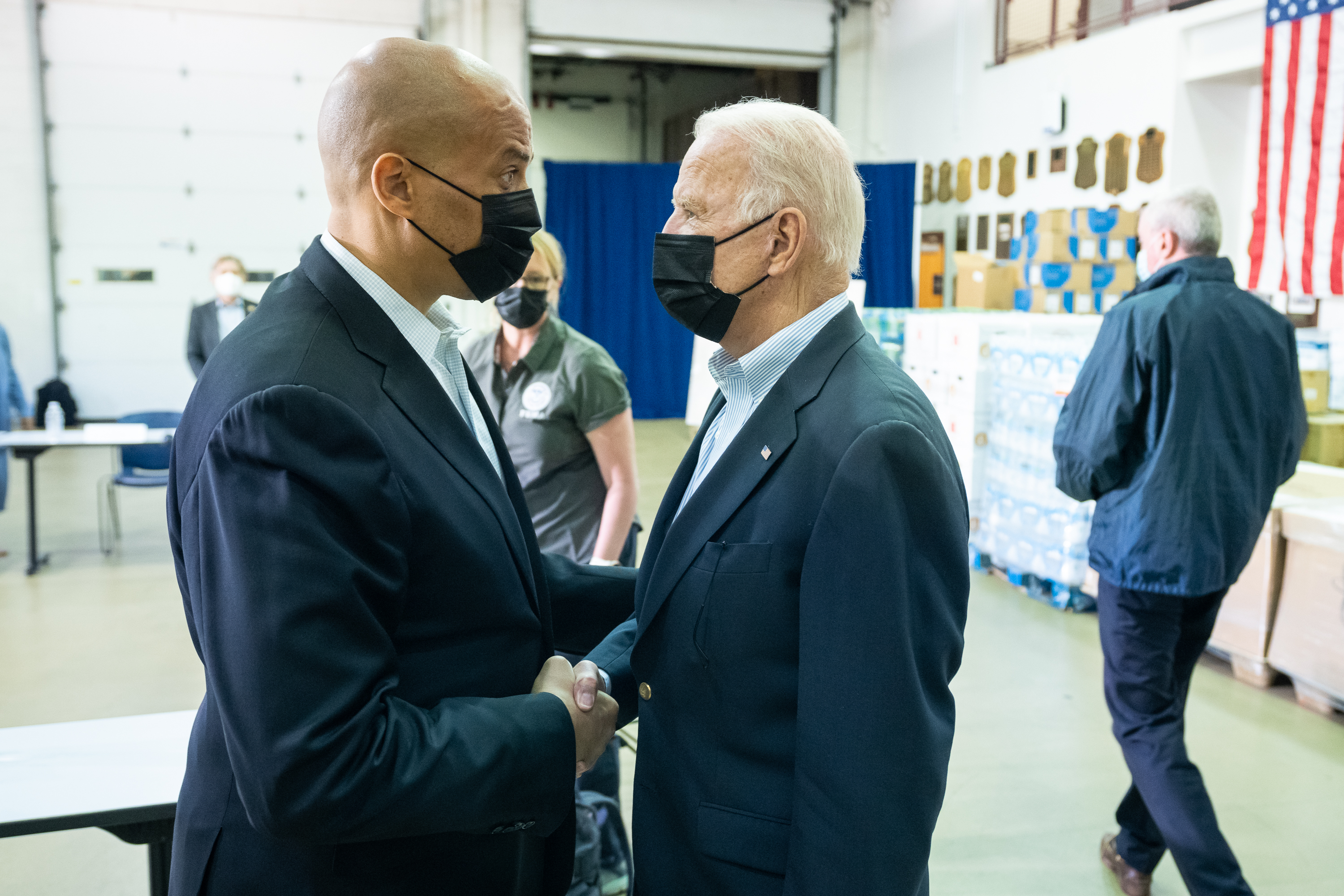
Booker and President Joe Biden in 2021

Booker supported fellow New Jersey Senator Bob Menendez when Menendez faced trial on federal corruption and bribery charges. During the trial, Booker was a character witness for Menendez, and praised him effusively. After the judge declared a mistrial, Booker argued that prosecutors ought not to try Menendez again. When Menendez ran for reelection, Booker said he was "so grateful for Bob Menendez and that I get to work with him and stand beside him". He downplayed the corruption allegations, saying "to try to continue to try to throw this kind of mud at him, it's not going to stick. It didn't stick when the government tried to do it and it should not stick now." He became New Jersey's senior senator after Menendez resigned on August 20, 2024.

In 2018, Politico named Booker part of the "Hell-No Caucus", along with Senators Kamala Harris, Kirsten Gillibrand, Elizabeth Warren, and Bernie Sanders, after he voted "overwhelmingly to thwart his [Trump's] nominees for administration jobs" (including Rex Tillerson, Betsy DeVos, and Mike Pompeo). The senators were all considered potential 2020 presidential contenders, and all five later launched 2020 presidential campaigns, losing in the primary to Joe Biden, who then chose Harris as his running mate.

In April 2018, after the FBI raided the hotel room and offices of Trump's personal attorney, Michael Cohen, Booker, Chris Coons, Lindsey Graham, and Thom Tillis introduced new legislation to "limit President Trump's ability to fire special counsel Robert Mueller." Termed the Special Counsel Independence and Integrity Act, the legislation would allow any special counsel, in this case Mueller, to receive an "expedited judicial review" in the 10 days following being dismissed to determine if said dismissal was suitable. If not, the special counsel would be reinstated. At the same time, according to The Hill, the bill would "codify regulations" that a special counsel could be fired by only a senior Justice Department official, while having to provide reasons in writing.

Booker delivering a 25-hour Senate speech in protest of the second Trump administration in 2025

On September 5, 2018, during the Senate Judiciary Committee's confirmation hearings for Brett Kavanaugh (nominated by Trump to replace retiring Associate Justice Anthony Kennedy on the Supreme Court), Booker questioned Kavanaugh on a series of emails marked "committee confidential" dating to Kavanaugh's time in the office of the White House Counsel during George W. Bush's presidency. The emails, which Booker's office released to the public the next day, show Kavanaugh and others in the Counsel's office discussing racial profiling as a means to combat terrorism, particularly after 9/11. Booker said that he was violating Senate rules in releasing the documents, with the penalty including possible expulsion from the Senate; he nonetheless defended his decision, referring to the process of producing documents for the hearing as a "sham" and challenging those who warned him about the consequences to "bring it on". Booker also described the release as "probably the closest I'll ever have in my life to an 'I am Spartacus' moment", referring to a line in the 1960 film Spartacus. Committee chairman Chuck Grassley said the documents had already been cleared for public release the night before, and that Booker was not violating any rules, leading some Republicans to accuse Booker of engaging in "theatrics" and "histrionics". Supreme Court Justice Clarence Thomas mocked Booker in comments the following week, saying, "Honorable—if we could use that word about more people who are in public life, people who actually ask the questions at confirmation hearings, instead of 'Spartacus.'" Booker was also one of several Democratic lawmakers and critics of President Trump who was targeted with a mailed pipe bomb.

Booker played a leading role in the push to pass the First Step Act, a bipartisan criminal justice reform bill. In 2018, he introduced the Marijuana Justice Act, which would legalize cannabis in the United States on the federal level, defund some law enforcement in jurisdictions that have shown racial bias in marijuana arrests, and increase funding to communities affected by the war on drugs.

Booker announced his candidacy for the Democratic nomination for president in the 2020 election on February 1, 2019.

Booker was participating in the certification of the 2021 United States Electoral College vote count on January 6, 2021, when Trump supporters stormed the U.S. Capitol. Minutes after rioters breached the Capitol, Booker and his fellow senators were evacuated from the chambers. Booker blamed Trump for inciting the attack. After the attack, Booker called for the invocation of the Twenty-fifth Amendment to the United States Constitution while writing on Twitter: "Trump incited a violent insurrection against our own government. Congress should be prepared to impeach & remove the President if the Vice President and Cabinet fail to adhere to their constitutional duty. We must protect our national security."

Booker has been notably critical of Kash Patel's tenure as FBI director

On March 31, 2025, Booker began a marathon speech, vowing to speak "for as long as I am physically able". Before taking the stand at 7 p.m. EDT, he posted a video explaining his rationale for the speech, saying that he had heard his constituents and those in other states asking Congress to "do things that recognize the ... crisis of the moment" regarding changes made by the Trump administration. Booker gave the longest speech in U.S. Senate history, surpassing Strom Thurmond's 24-hour-and-18 minute-long filibuster of the Civil Rights Act of 1957. He said: "To hate him is wrong, and maybe my ego got too caught up in if I stood here maybe, maybe—just maybe—I could break this record of the man who tried to stop the rights upon which I stand. ... I'm not here, though, because of his speech. I'm here despite his speech. I'm here because as powerful as he was, the people were more powerful." Booker's address was 25 hours and five minutes long.

In May 2025, Booker was the only Democrat to vote to confirm Charles Kushner as United States Ambassador to France. According to the New Jersey Globe, "Booker and Kushner have a relationship that goes back decades, dating to when Kushner provided financial support for Booker's first unsuccessful run for mayor in 2002."

=== 119th United States Congress Committee assignments ===
- Committee on Agriculture, Nutrition, and Forestry
- Committee on Foreign Relations
- Committee on Small Business and Entrepreneurship
- Committee on the Judiciary

=== Caucus memberships ===
- Black Maternal Health Caucus
- Congressional Asian Pacific American Caucus
- Congressional Black Caucus
- Congressional NextGen 9-1-1 Caucus

== 2020 presidential campaign ==
Logo for presidential campaign

On February 1, 2019, Booker announced his campaign for the Democratic nomination for President of the United States in the 2020 presidential election. Before his announcement, it was widely speculated that he would run for president but he expressed uncertainty about it. Within a month after Booker announced his candidacy, Governor Phil Murphy, Bob Menendez, and every Democratic member of the House of Representatives from New Jersey endorsed him. Booker held a campaign kickoff rally in Newark on April 13. After qualifying for the first five Democratic Party presidential debates, he failed to meet the polling thresholds to participate in the sixth debate in December 2019. On January 13, 2020, Booker announced that he was suspending his campaign. In March 2020, Booker endorsed former vice president Joe Biden for president.

== Political positions ==
Booker's position early in his career has been characterized as that of a centrist "Clinton Democrat", overall "market-friendly, fiscally conservative", followed by a liberal voting record in this first term as senator. During his 2020 presidential bid, he was criticized by the Republican National Committee as disingenuous, and has received criticism from progressives for issues including his fundraising and ties to the business community. In 2026, he was found listed in a directory of Dialog, a secretive organization founded by Peter Thiel.

=== Progressivism ===
Booker has a liberal voting record as a senator. In a July 2013 Salon interview, he said, "there's nothing in that realm of progressive politics where you won't find me." In a September 2013 interview with The Grio, when asked whether he considered himself a progressive, he said he was a Democrat and an American. According to the Humane Society, Booker has had the most pro-animal welfare voting record in the Senate year after year.

In 2017, Booker voted against a proposal to lower prescription drug prices, which led to criticism that he was too dependent on corporate support. In 2021, The American Prospect criticized Booker and Bob Menendez for recommending Christine O'Hearne to a federal judgeship after she had spent much of her career defending employers against discrimination and sexual harassment claims, and had defended a school against allegations that its swim coach had sexually abused a girl from ages 13 to 19.

=== Economic issues ===
In 2010, Booker supported long-term deficit reduction efforts for economic growth, cap and trade taxation to combat climate change, and increased funding for education. He has spoken in favor of creating a federal job guarantee and baby bonds (low-risk savings accounts that minors get access to at age 18).

=== Social issues ===
In the Senate, Booker has emphasized issues of racial and social justice. He played a leading role in passing the First Step Act, a bipartisan criminal justice reform bill. He supports ending the war on drugs, legalization of cannabis, abortion rights, affirmative action, and LGBTQ+ rights, voting for the Respect for Marriage Act in 2022.

=== Healthcare ===
Booker supports single-payer healthcare. In September 2017, he, Bernie Sanders, and 14 other co-sponsors submitted a single-payer plan to Congress called the "Medicare for All" bill. Booker opposes abolishing private health insurance. Along with Senate Republicans in 2017, he voted against a measure to allow cheaper prescription drugs to be imported from Canada, citing concerns about the safety of Canadian drugs, which lead to the measure's defeat. He faced progressive criticism for his vote. Booker is one of the Senate's top financial recipients from the pharmaceutical industry.

=== Foreign policy ===
After the US strike on Syria in April 2017, Booker criticized military action "without a clear plan" or authorization from Congress.

==== Israeli–Palestinian conflict ====
Booker has expressed consistent support for Israel. He has said he was "a supporter of Israel well before I was in the United States Senate". He has quoted the Bible (Psalm 137:5): "If I forget thee, O Israel, may I cut off my right hand".

Booker supported a resolution celebrating the 50th anniversary of the Israeli annexation of East Jerusalem in 2017.

Booker supports a two-state solution to the Israeli–Palestinian conflict. He has said that Iran is a direct threat to U.S. and Israeli security and feels all options should be on the table for dealing with the conflict, but his decision to back the Iran nuclear deal framework damaged his long-term relationship with some Jewish voters and supporters. In an attempt to reduce the damage, he initiated an emergency summit for Jewish leaders, which some of his longstanding supporters did not attend. Booker was the sole Democratic co-sponsor of the Israel Anti-Boycott Act, receiving criticism from free speech advocates.

==== Gaza war ====
In August 2025, Booker was in a minority of Senate Democrats that voted against an effort led by Bernie Sanders to block the sale of military arms to Israel in response to rising death tolls from the Gaza war and restrictions on humanitarian aid resulting in severe starvation. He consistently voted for arms sales to Israel and against Sanders's resolutions to condition military aid to Israel amid the Gaza Strip famine and humanitarian crisis, saying it "would restrict our country's ability to provide future security guarantees without achieving the goal of ending this war now or increasing vital humanitarian aid".

==== Relationship with AIPAC ====
In 2019, Booker said that he and the president of the pro-Israel lobby group AIPAC "talk often" and "text message back and forth like teenagers". In the same year, he told an AIPAC audience, "We need leadership in both parties that is about uniting Americans around a common cause. And what greater tradition has there been in America, going back to the founding of Israel that we have common cause with the state of Israel. We have a common cause, and they are our allies". He has received approximately $800,000 from AIPAC, and has said that he attended AIPAC conferences "well before I knew that one day I would be [a senator]".

In March 2026, Booker said he would not accept donations from AIPAC.

== Other activities ==
=== Obama association ===
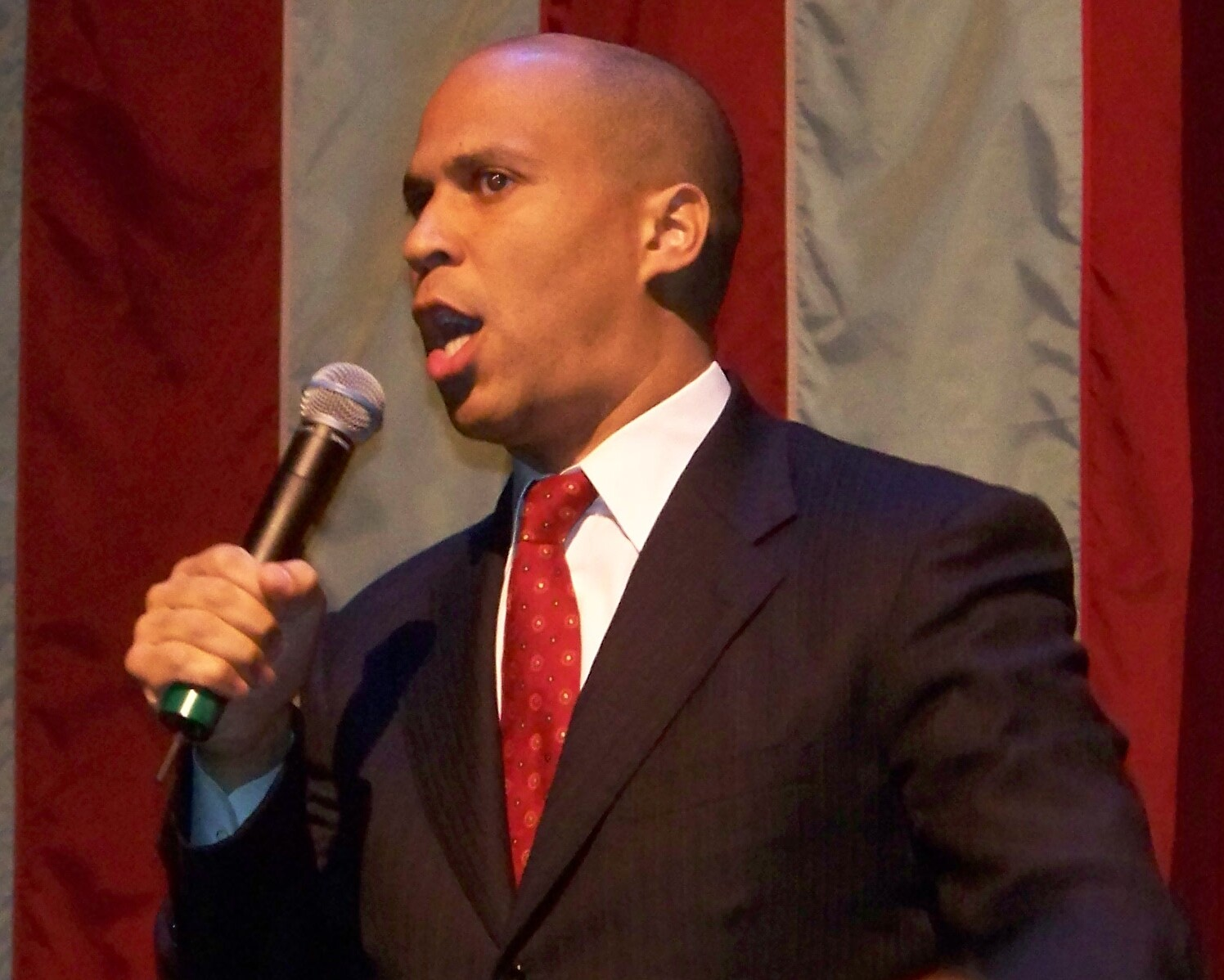
Booker campaigning in Newark for Barack Obama in 2007

In 2009, after Barack Obama became President of the United States, Booker was offered the leadership of the new White House Office of Urban Affairs. He turned the offer down, citing a commitment to Newark.

Booker generated controversy on May 12, 2012, when he appeared on Meet the Press as a surrogate for Obama's reelection campaign and made remarks critical of that campaign. Booker said that the attacks on Republican presidential candidate Mitt Romney's record at Bain Capital were "nauseating to me on both sides. It's nauseating to the American public. Enough is enough. Stop attacking private equity. Stop attacking Jeremiah Wright." The Romney campaign used the comments against Obama. Booker made follow-up comments clarifying that he believed Obama's attacks on Romney's record at Bain were legitimate but did not retract his point about attacking private equity in general. Two weeks later, Booker's communications director Anne Torres tendered her resignation, although she maintained it was unrelated to Meet the Press.

=== Affiliations and honors ===
Booker sits on the board of advisers of the political action committee Democrats for Education Reform. He is a member of the board of trustees at Teachers College, Columbia University and was formerly a member of the executive committee at Yale Law School and the board of trustees at Stanford University.

In 2010, Booker received the U.S. Senator John Heinz Award for Greatest Public Service by an Elected or Appointed Official, an award given out annually by the Jefferson Awards.

In May 2009, Booker received an honorary doctor of humane letters degree from the Newark-based New Jersey Institute of Technology for "his outstanding career in public service as the Mayor of Newark." In May 2009, he received an honorary doctorate from Brandeis University and was a commencement speaker that year. Booker received another honorary Doctor of Humane Letters degree in December 2010 from Yeshiva University for "his bold vision for Newark and setting a national standard for urban transformation." In June 2011, Booker received an honorary doctor of laws degree for the urban transformation of Newark and served as that year's commencement speaker at Williams College. In May 2012, Booker received an honorary doctor of laws degree from Bard College and gave the commencement speech. In 2010, he delivered the commencement addresses at Pitzer College on May 15; at Columbia University's Teachers College on May 17; and at Suffolk University Law School on May 23. Booker gave the commencement address to New York Law School graduates on May 13, 2011, at Avery Fisher Hall (now David Geffen Hall) at Lincoln Center. He gave the commencement address at the University of Rhode Island in May 2011; he also received an honorary Doctor of Humane Letters degree. He delivered a commencement address to Stanford University graduates on June 17, 2012, at Stanford Stadium. He also received an honorary degree at Fairleigh Dickinson's 69th commencement ceremony in May 2012.

In May 2013, Booker gave the commencement address at Washington University in St. Louis and received an honorary doctorate of law.

On May 16, 2014, Booker gave the commencement speech at Ramapo College of New Jersey at the IZOD Center.

During the 2016 presidential election, when Clinton had an illness described as pneumonia, Donna Brazile, the then-DNC interim chair considered that her ideal replacement ticket would consist of Biden and Booker. But the possibility of a divisive reaction and the possibility of "allowing Trump to capture votes in confusion" caused her to "not entertain any more thoughts of replacing Hillary."

=== Films ===
Filmmaker Marshall Curry chronicled Booker's 2002 mayoral campaign in the documentary Street Fight. The film was nominated in 2005 for the Academy Award for Best Documentary Feature.

Since 2009, Booker has starred in the documentary series Brick City. The series focuses on Booker's efforts to improve Newark by reducing crime and bring about economic renewal. Brick City won a Peabody Award in 2009 and was nominated for a Primetime Emmy in 2010.

Booker contributed to the 2011 documentary Miss Representation and commented on the representations of women in politics in mass media.

Booker appeared in a scene in the 2015 Parks and Recreation episode "Ms. Ludgate-Dwyer Goes to Washington" alongside Orrin Hatch.

Booker appeared in the 2024 Netflix documentary You Are What You Eat: A Twin Experiment. Also in 2024, he provided voiceover for Mercy for Animals' Voices of Hope - Words of Wisdom by Dr. Jane Goodall.

=== Conan O'Brien "feud" ===
In the fall of 2009, Tonight Show host Conan O'Brien engaged in a satirical on-air and YouTube feud with Booker, with O'Brien jokingly insulting Newark and Booker responding that he would ban O'Brien from the Newark airport. Then-Secretary of State Hillary Clinton called for the feud to end during a prepared comedy skit, telling Booker to chalk it up to a head injury O'Brien suffered less than two weeks earlier. Booker then appeared on O'Brien's show and assured viewers that the feud was over and that he was actually a big fan of O'Brien, who agreed that every time he made a joke about Newark, he would donate $500 to the City of Newark, and also made a $50,000 donation to the Newark Now charity, which NBC Universal matched.

=== Waywire ===
In 2012, Booker and tech executives Sarah Ross and Nathan Richardson formed Waywire, a company focused on video sharing technology. Early investors included Oprah Winfrey, Eric Schmidt, Jeff Weiner, and Troy Carter. After Booker's relationship to Waywire was discussed in a front-page New York Times story, board member Andrew Zucker stepped down from his position. Shortly thereafter, Waywire CEO Richardson departed the business as the company shifted its focus from content creation to content curation. In August 2013, Booker told NBC News he intended to resign from the Waywire board and put his holdings in a trust if elected to the Senate; by September, he had resigned from the board and donated his share of the company to charity. Waywire was sold to another video curation business the next month.

=== Books ===
Booker's autobiography, United: Thoughts on Finding Common Ground and Advancing the Common Good, was published in 2016.

In an article in HuffPost, Shmuly Yanklowitz said of the book:

If there is anything that Booker repeatedly returns to in United, it is that the myopia of contemporary politics leads citizens astray, and leaves them vulnerable to ignoring issues of tangible importance. "I believe that this broken system, which afflicts us all, will be repaired" writes Booker near the end of the book. To repeat an earlier point, what sets Senator Booker's work apart from that of similar political books is that it seeks to elevate discourse rather than bring down opponents of the opposite partisan persuasion.

In 2026, Booker published his second book, Stand, in which he argues for 10 virtues he believes are necessary in American life, and adds stories from American history that showcase these virtues.

== Personal life ==
=== Marriage ===
In September 2025, Booker announced his engagement to Alexis Lewis. Lewis is senior vice president of investments at Brasa Capital Management (a real estate investment manager in Los Angeles) and was formerly the economic policy manager for the Los Angeles mayor's Office of Economic Development. Lewis and Booker were set up by a mutual friend, and met in person for the first time while Lewis was traveling to D.C. in 2024.

On November 24, 2025, Booker and Lewis married in a civil ceremony in Newark, officiated by Judge Julien Neals. At the time of their marriage Booker was 56 and Lewis was 38. They also had an interfaith religious ceremony in Washington on November 29. Lewis is Jewish.

=== Prior relationships and rumors on orientation ===
In 2013 Booker was named one of Town & Country's "Top 40 Bachelors". Although he has generally tried to keep his personal life private, Booker has called himself a "straight male" and said he was trying to date more in hopes of finding someone with whom to settle down. He was romantically linked to poet Cleo Wade. In March 2019, actress Rosario Dawson confirmed to TMZ that she was in a relationship with Booker; their relationship ended in February 2022.

In 1992, Booker wrote in his The Stanford Daily column about a sexual encounter during his teenage years, the messages he received about sex when he was young, and his changed attitude toward sex. According to the column, one of Booker's friends kissed him at a party after he tried to hug her. When Booker "slowly reached for her breast", she pushed his hand away, but Booker groped her. During the encounter, Booker's friend was drunk, and Booker was 15 years old. Afterward, the two remained friends. As a freshman and sophomore at Stanford University, Booker was disgusted by sexist and violent comments other men made about women. He said his work as a peer counselor with victims of rape was a "wake-up call" and he "snapped from one extreme to the other". According to Booker, one friend called him a "man-hater" for his comments on patriarchy and the abuse of women. In his column, Booker criticized treating sex as "game" or "competition", saying that these "skewed attitudes" lead to rape. The Daily Caller and Fox News brought up the column during the Kavanaugh confirmation hearings in September 2018. Booker considered Christine Blasey Ford's allegations "serious and credible" and criticized the Republican majority for failing to investigate them.

In a 1992 column in The Stanford Daily, Booker admitted that as a teenager he had "hated gays". He has himself been rumored to be gay and has generally refused to address rumors like these on principle, as he explained in 2013:

Because I want to challenge people on their homophobia. I love seeing on Twitter when someone says I'm gay, and I say, "So what does it matter if I am? So be it. I hope you are not voting for me because you are making the presumption that I'm straight."

=== Other personal information ===
Booker regularly exercises and has been a vegetarian since 1992, when he was a student at Oxford University. He abstains from alcohol and "has no known vices or addictions (except books)". In 2014, Booker began practicing a vegan diet and has expressed his vegan ethical philosophy and advocacy for animals. As of June 2016, Booker worshiped at the Metropolitan Baptist Church in Newark.

From 1998 to 2006, Booker lived in Brick Towers, a troubled housing complex in Newark's Central Ward. In November 2006, as one of the last remaining tenants in Brick Towers, Booker left his apartment for the top unit in a three-story rental on Hawthorne Avenue in Newark's South Ward, an area described as "a drug- and gang-plagued neighborhood of boarded-up houses and empty lots." Brick Towers has since been demolished, and a new mixed-income development was built there in 2010.

Since 2013, Booker has lived in a townhouse he owns in the Lincoln Park section of Newark's Central Ward, also known as "the Coast" for its arts, jazz, and nightlife history.

Booker speaks Spanish; he attended a Spanish immersion program in Ecuador.

In 2020, Booker learned that he and entertainer RuPaul are cousins after both appeared on the TV show Finding Your Roots.

In November 2022, Booker wrote a letter of support and leniency for Theranos founder Elizabeth Holmes to the federal judge assigned to sentence her. In the letter, he wrote that Holmes "holds onto the hope that she can make contributions to the lives of others and that she can, despite mistakes, make the world a better place."

== Electoral history ==
2002 Newark mayoral election
Party	Candidate	Votes	%
Nonpartisan	Sharpe James (incumbent)	28,363	52.9
Nonpartisan	Cory Booker	24,869	46.5
Nonpartisan	Dwayne Smith	339	0.6
Total votes		53,571	100.0

2006 Newark mayoral election
Party	Candidate	Votes	%
Nonpartisan	Cory Booker	32,134	72.1
Nonpartisan	Ronald L. Rice	10,337	23.2
Nonpartisan	David Blount	1,831	4.1
Nonpartisan	Nancy Rosenstock	238	0.5
Total votes		44,540	100.0

2010 Newark mayoral election
Party	Candidate	Votes	%
Nonpartisan	Cory Booker (incumbent)	22,745	59.1
Nonpartisan	Clifford J. Minor	13,570	35.3
Nonpartisan	Yvonne Garrett Moore	1,703	4.4
Nonpartisan	Mirna L. White	444	1.2
Total votes		38,462	100.0

2013 United States Senate special election in New Jersey – Democratic primary
Party	Candidate	Votes	%
Democratic	Cory Booker	216,936	59.2
Democratic	Frank Pallone	72,584	19.8
Democratic	Rush Holt Jr.	61,463	16.8
Democratic	Sheila Oliver	15,656	4.3
Total votes		366,639	100.0
Majority		144,352	39.4

2013 United States Senate special election in New Jersey
Party	Candidate	Votes	%
Democratic	Cory Booker	740,742	54.9
Republican	Steve Lonegan	593,684	44.2
Ed the Barber	Edward Stackhouse Jr.	5,138	0.4
Independent	Robert DePasquale	3,137	0.2
Alimony Reform Now	Stuart David Meissner	2,051	0.2
Unity is Strength	Pablo Olivera	1,530	0.1
Freedom of Choice	Antonio Nico Sabas	1,336	0.1
Democratic-Republican	Eugene Martin Lavergne	1,041	0.1
Total votes		1,348,659	100.0
Majority		147,058	10.9
Democratic gain from Republican			

2014 United States Senate election in New Jersey
Party	Candidate	Votes	%	±%
Democratic	Cory Booker (incumbent)	1,043,866	55.8	+0.9
Republican	Jeff Bell	791,297	42.3	−1.7
Libertarian	Joseph Baratelli	16,721	0.9	+0.4
Economic Growth	Hank Schroeder	5,704	0.3	+0.3
Independent	Jeff Boss	4,513	0.2	+0.2
Democratic-Republican	Eugene Martin Lavergne	3,890	0.2	+0.1
Independent	Antonio Nico Sabas	3,544	0.2	+0.12
Total votes		1,869,535	100.0	+38.6
Majority		252,569	13.5	+2.6
Democratic hold				

2020 United States Senate election in New Jersey – Democratic primary
Party	Candidate	Votes	%
Democratic	Cory Booker (incumbent)	366,105	89.4%
Democratic	Lawrence Hamm	43,195	10.6%
Total votes		409,300	100.0%

2020 United States Senate election in New Jersey
Party	Candidate	Votes	%	±%
Democratic	Cory Booker (incumbent)	2,541,178	57.23%	+1.39%
Republican	Rikin Mehta	1,817,052	40.92%	−1.41%
Green	Madelyn Hoffman	38,288	0.86%	N/A
Independent	Veronica Fernandez	32,290	0.73%	N/A
Independent	Daniel Burke	11,632	0.26%	N/A
Total votes		4,440,440	100.0%	
Democratic hold				

== See also ==
- Barack Obama Supreme Court candidates
- List of African-American United States senators
- List of African-American United States Senate candidates

Political offices
Preceded by Sharpe James	Mayor of Newark; 2006–2013	Succeeded by Luis Quintana
Party political offices
Preceded by Frank Lautenberg	Democratic nominee for U.S. Senator from New Jersey (Class 2); 2013, 2014, 2020, 2026	Most recent
Preceded by Barbara Boxer	Senate Democratic Chief Deputy Whip; 2017–2021; Served alongside: Jeff Merkley, Brian Schatz	Succeeded by Jeff Merkley; Brian Schatz
Preceded by Joe Manchin	Vice Chair of the Senate Democratic Policy and Communications Committee; 2021–2025; Served alongside: Joe Manchin	Succeeded by Jeanne Shaheen as Vice Chair of the Senate Democratic Steering and Policy Committee
Preceded by Joe Manchin	Vice Chair of the Senate Democratic Policy and Communications Committee; 2021–2025; Served alongside: Joe Manchin	Succeeded by Tina Smith as Vice Chair of the Senate Democratic Strategic Communications Committee
Preceded by Debbie Stabenow as Senate Democratic Policy and Communications Committee	Chair of the Senate Democratic Strategic Communications Committee; 2025–present	Incumbent
U.S. Senate
Preceded by Jeffrey Chiesa	United States Senator (Class 2) from New Jersey; 2013–present Served alongside: Bob Menendez, George Helmy, Andy Kim	Incumbent
U.S. order of precedence (ceremonial)
Preceded by Ed Markey	Order of precedence of the United States as United States senator	Succeeded by Thom Tillis
Preceded by Ed Markey	Seniority in the U.S. Senate; 45th	Succeeded by Shelley Moore Capito
