= 2002 Newark mayoral election =

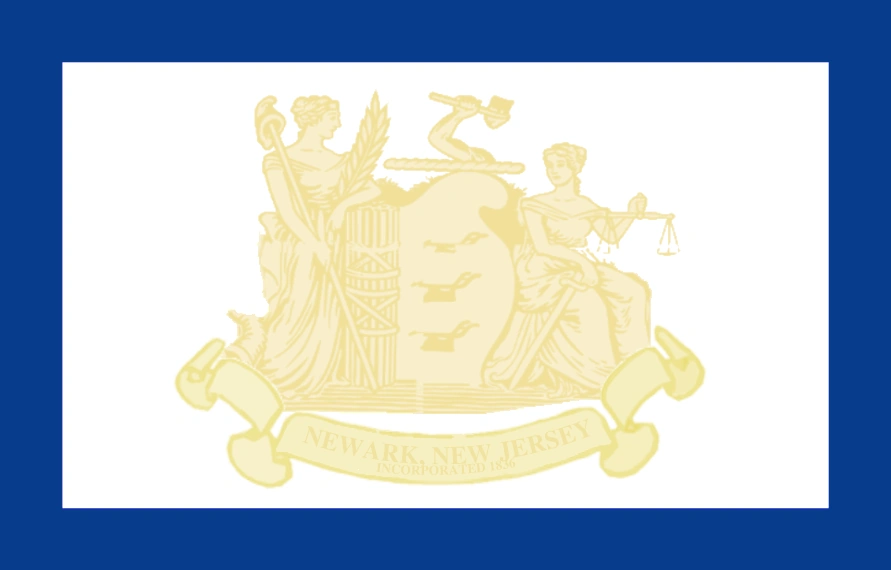
- May 14, 2002
- Turnout: 19.58%
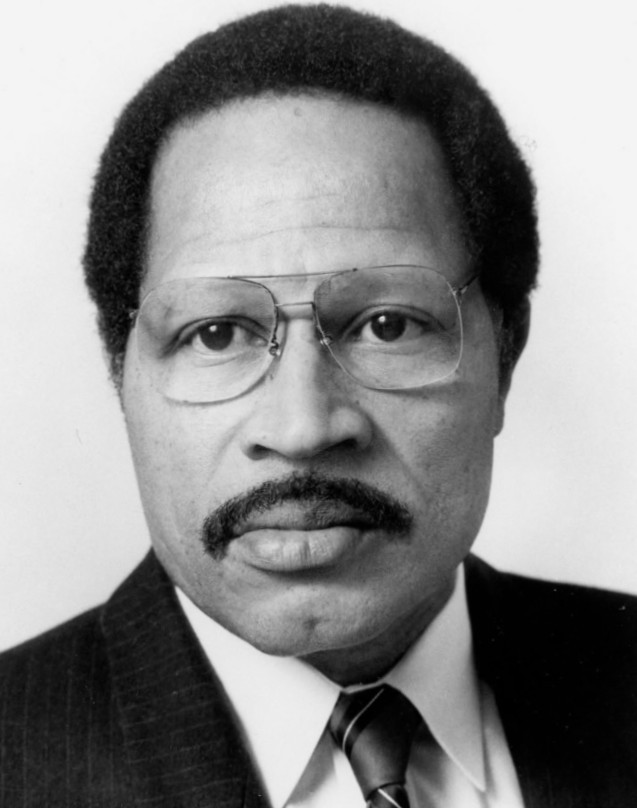

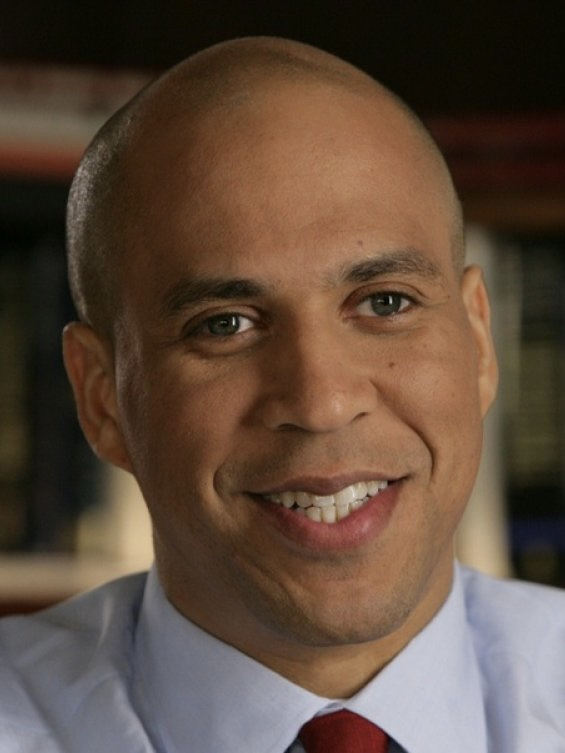
| Candidate | Sharpe James | Cory Booker |
| Party | Nonpartisan | Nonpartisan |
| Popular vote | 28,300 | 24,800 |
| Percentage | 52.3% | 46.7% |
Mayor before election
Sharpe James
Democratic
Elected mayor
Sharpe James
Democratic

The 2002 election for Mayor of Newark took place in Newark, the most populous city in the state of New Jersey, on May 14, 2002. Elections for all seats on the nine-member Municipal Council of Newark were held the same day. A runoff election, if necessary, would have taken place. Elections in the city are non-partisan and candidates are not listed by political party. Incumbent Mayor and State Senator Sharpe James avoided a runoff and was re-elected to his fifth term in office. He was the first Newark mayor to be elected five times.

This campaign was the subject of the 2005 documentary Street Fight. Cory Booker, who had become a municipal council member in 1998, was elected Mayor of Newark in 2006 and re-elected in 2010. After having won the October 16 special election for U.S. senator he resigned as mayor and was sworn in on October 31, 2013 as the junior U.S. senator from New Jersey. He was an unsuccessful candidate in the 2020 Democratic Party presidential primaries, ending his campaign three weeks before the first nominating contest, the 2020 Iowa Democratic caucuses.

== Candidates ==
The deadline for candidates to file for election was April 14.

=== Declared ===
- Cory Booker, Newark Municipal Councilman
- Sharpe James, State Senator and incumbent Mayor of Newark
- Dwayne Smith, businessman and former law enforcement officer

Though all elections are non-partisan, all candidates are registered Democrats and Newark is a heavily Democratic city.

== Campaign ==
The election was noted for its acrimony and attacks by both candidates. James called Booker "a Republican who took money from the KKK [and] Taliban ... [who's] collaborating with the Jews to take over Newark". Booker focused on James's reputation for corruption.

One focus of the campaign was race. Booker, who is of mixed African and European ancestry and was raised in the wealthy suburbs, was accused of insufficient connection to the city's impoverished, majority-black voters.

=== Endorsements ===
Cory Booker

National elected officials

- Bill Bradley, United States Senator from New Jersey
- Floyd Flake, United States Representative from New York

Individuals

- Arianna Huffington, publisher and businesswoman
- Spike Lee, filmmaker
- Cornel West, Princeton University professor

Newspapers

- The New York Times
- The Newark Star-Ledger
Sharpe James

National elected officials

- Jon Corzine, United States Senator from New Jersey

State elected officials

- Jim McGreevey, Governor of New Jersey

Individuals

- Jesse Jackson, civil rights leader and candidate for President in 1984 and 1988
- Al Sharpton, civil rights leader and frequent candidate for public office from New York

== Results ==
If no candidate received 50% of the vote, the race would have continued to a run-off between the top two candidates from the first round.

James received 52.95 percent of the total vote, securing re-election.

Results
| Party | Candidate | Votes | % |
|---|---|---|---|
| Nonpartisan | Sharpe James (incumbent) | 28,363 | 52.9% |
| Nonpartisan | Cory Booker | 24,869 | 46.5% |
| Nonpartisan | Dwayne Smith | 339 | 0.6% |
| Total votes | | 53,571 | 100.00 |
