= Jeff Halevy =

American fitness contributor

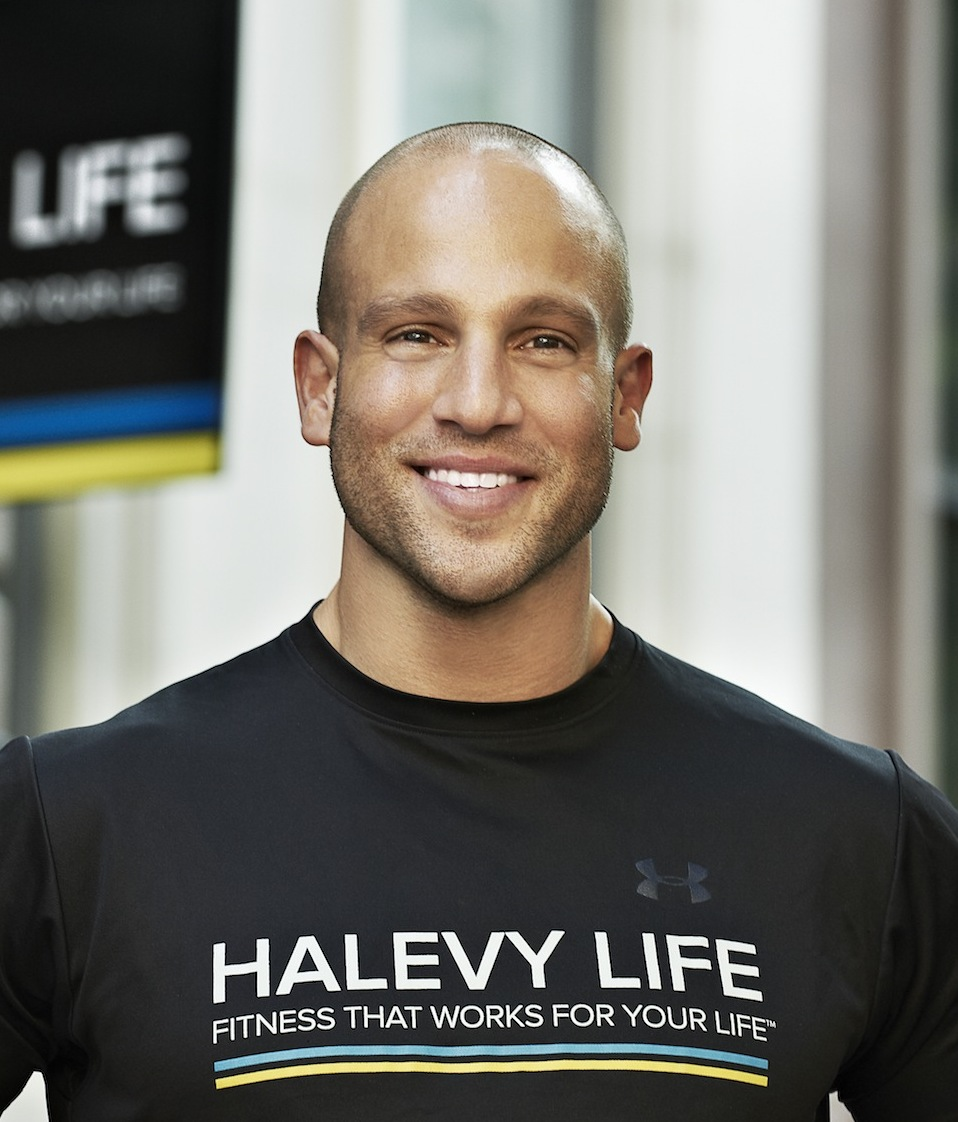
- Born: May 7, 1979 (age 47); Nogales, Arizona, U.S.
- Occupations: public health advocate, fitness advisor, CEO
- Spouse: Mylene Specogna (divorced) Rory Adele Halevy (m. 2019; died 2022)
- Website: jeffhalevy.com

Jeff Halevy is an American author, public health advocate, and fitness contributor to various media outlets. He is the host of a cable television program Workout From Within with Jeff Halevy. Workout From Within with Jeff Halevy and was a correspondent on NBC's Today Show from 2013 to 2014. In 2011, Halevy joined Michelle Obama's Let's Move! campaign, and launched a pilot run of his Our Power program in Newark, NJ.
