= Kenneth A. Gibson =

American politician (1932–2019)

Kenneth Gibson
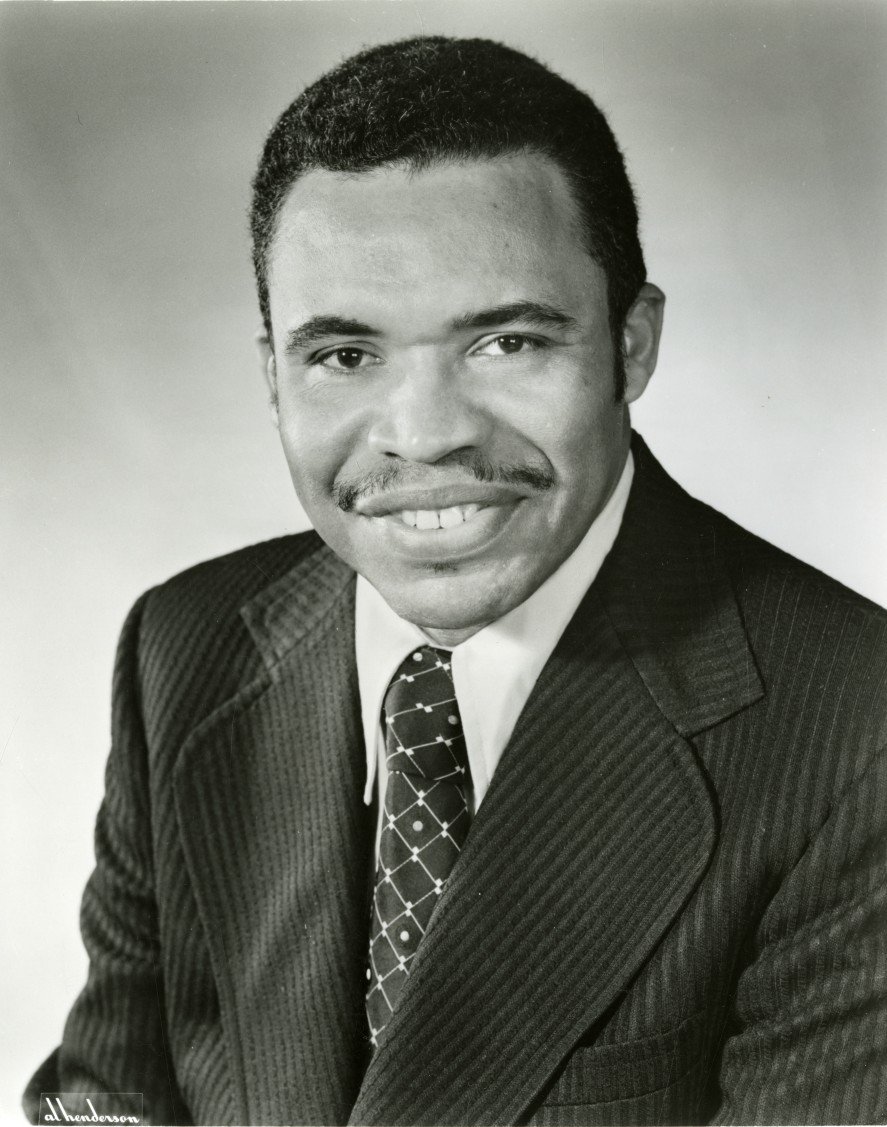
- Gibson in 1985

36th Mayor of Newark
- In office July 1, 1970 – July 1, 1986
- Preceded by: Hugh Addonizio
- Succeeded by: Sharpe James

34th President of the United States Conference of Mayors
- In office 1976–1977
- Preceded by: Moon Landrieu
- Succeeded by: Lee Alexander

Personal details
- Born: Kenneth Allen Gibson; May 15, 1932 Enterprise, Alabama, U.S.
- Died: March 29, 2019 (aged 86) West Orange, New Jersey, U.S.
- Party: Democratic
- Spouse(s): (1) Muriel Cook Gibson (until her death in 1983) (2) Camille Savoc (until his death)
- Children: 3 children; 1 stepdaughter
- Education: Newark College of Engineering

Military service
- Allegiance: United States
- Branch/service: United States Army
- Unit: 65th Engineer Battalion

Kenneth Allen Gibson (May 15, 1932 – March 29, 2019) was an American politician of the Democratic Party who was the 36th mayor of Newark, New Jersey from 1970 to 1986. He was the first African American mayor of a major city in the Northeastern United States.

== Early life and education ==
Gibson grew up in Newark, New Jersey, and attended Central High School, where he played with a dance band after school to bring in income needed for his family. Gibson studied civil engineering at Newark College of Engineering (now New Jersey Institute of Technology), but financial challenges forced him to drop out of school after a few months to work in a factory, serve in the military and later work for the New Jersey Highway Department, completing his engineering degree in 1963 by taking night classes.

== Early career ==
Gibson worked as an engineer for the New Jersey Highway Department from 1950 to 1960. From 1960 to 1966, he was chief engineer for the Newark Housing Authority, and chief structural engineer for the city from 1966 to 1970.

== Mayoral career ==
Emerging from a crowded six-candidate field, Gibson was elected in a runoff election in 1970, defeating incumbent mayor Hugh Addonizio. At the time Gibson noted that "Newark may be the most decayed and financially crippled city in the nation." He entered office as a reformer, alleging that the prior administration was corrupt. Later that same year, Mayor Addonizio was convicted of extortion and conspiracy.

Gibson was also a representative of the city's large African-American population, many of whom were migrants or whose parents or grandparents had come North in the Great Migration. The city's industrial power had diminished sharply. Deindustrialization since the 1950s cost tens of thousands of jobs when African Americans were still arriving from the South looking for better opportunities than in their former communities.

Combined with forces of suburbanization and racial tensions, the city encountered problems similar to those of other major industrial cities of the North and Midwest in the 1960s - increasing poverty and dysfunction for families left without employment. The city was scarred by race riots in 1967, three years before Gibson took office. Many businesses and residents left the city after the riots.

Gibson's election was seen by some in almost prophetic terms. Poet and playwright Amiri Baraka wrote, "We will nationalize the city's institutions, as if it were liberated territory in Zimbabwe or Angola." Gibson himself said, "Wherever American cities are going, Newark will get there first". Gibson entered and with his new city council "challenged the corporate sector's tax arrangements and pushed business interests to take a more active and responsible role in the community."

By 1974, Gibson had alienated some of his supporters in his efforts to keep businesses from leaving the city. Amiri Baraka then labeled him a "neo-colonialist" and complained that Gibson was "for the profit of Prudential, Public (private) Service, Port Authority, and other huge corporations that run in and around and through and out of Newark paying little or no taxes" while the residents were ignored. Corporate and state interests had major influence in the city. He stated that the city was beyond electing someone because they were black. He was reelected in 1974.

In 1976, Gibson became the first African-American president of the United States Conference of Mayors. He served as president from 1976 until the next year.

In 1979, Gibson received the U.S. Senator John Heinz Award for Greatest Public Service by an Elected or Appointed Official, an award given out annually by the Jefferson Awards.

After 16 years under Gibson, the city’s unemployment rate had risen nearly 50 percent, its population had continued dropping, it had no movie theaters, only one supermarket remained, and only two-thirds of its high school students were graduating. In 1986, Democratic challenger Sharpe James defeated Gibson in his attempt to be reelected for a fifth term.

== Later life ==
After unsuccessful runs in 1981 and 1985 for the Democratic nomination for New Jersey governor, he was defeated as well in his bid for a fifth consecutive term as mayor by Councilman Sharpe James. Gibson then ran an engineering consulting business until 1998, when he said that the timing was right to return to politics. He ran for Essex County executive but lost in a close vote to incumbent James Treffinger.

On July 24, 2000, Gibson was indicted for bribery and for stealing funds from a school construction project in nearby Irvington, New Jersey. Gibson went to trial the following year, but a jury failed to reach a unanimous decision, and thus a mistrial was declared. In November 2002, Gibson agreed to plead guilty to tax evasion as long as the other charges were dropped.

In a 2005 interview with The New York Times, Gibson said his "most gratifying" mayoral accomplishment had been improving Newark's health services, leading to a reduction in the city's high rates of tuberculosis, infant mortality and the deaths of mothers during childbirth. He also said he regretted not having been able to "attract major job-producing industries to the city." Regarding the criminal cases, Gibson observed that "a public figure of note" is often a target of prosecutors seeking advancement, "whether or not we should be." But "when the history books are written, Ken Gibson's name will be there," he said, adding that he did not think "anyone will remember" the names of his prosecutors.

== Death and legacy ==
Gibson died in West Orange, New Jersey, on March 29, 2019, at the age of 86. Funeral services were held at Newark Symphony Hall on April 4, 2019.

In May 2019, Broad Street in Newark was designated Mayor Kenneth A. Gibson Boulevard.

== See also ==
- List of first African-American mayors

Political offices
Preceded by Hugh Addonizio	Mayor of Newark; 1970–1986	Succeeded by Sharpe James
