= Street Fight (film) =

2005 documentary film by Marshall Curry

- Promotional poster for Street Fight
- Directed by: Marshall Curry
- Written by: Marshall Curry
- Produced by: Marshall Curry
- Starring: Cory Booker; Sharpe James; Al Sharpton
- Cinematography: Marshall Curry
- Edited by: Marshall Curry; Rachel Kittner; Mary Manhardt
- Music by: James Baxter
- Production company: Marshall Curry Productions
- Distributed by: Argot Pictures (theatrical); PBS (television)
- Release dates: April 23, 2005 (Tribeca Film Festival); November 5, 2005 (United States)
- Running time: 83 minutes
- Country: United States
- Language: English
- Box office: $4,779

Street Fight is a 2005 documentary film by Marshall Curry, chronicling the 2002 Newark mayoral election which pitted upstart Cory Booker against the incumbent Sharpe James for Mayor of Newark, New Jersey. Other credits include Rory Kennedy (executive producer), Liz Garbus (executive producer), Mary Manhardt (additional editor), Marisa Karplus (associate producer), Catherine Jones (associate producer), and Adam Etline (story consultant). Street Fight screened at the 2005 Tribeca Film Festival and was later aired on the PBS series P.O.V. on July 5, 2005, and CBC Newsworld in Canada on May 7, 2006. The film was nominated for an Academy Award for Best Documentary Feature.

== Synopsis ==
The film details the hard-fought mayoral campaign by a young community activist and City Council member (Booker) against a 16-year incumbent mayor (James) with a powerful political machine. The documentary follows Booker and several of his campaign workers from their early days of door-knocking on Newark streets through the campaign's dramatic conclusion.

Through the course of the film, Booker's living conditions, race, ethnicity, religion, sexuality, political affiliations, and position in Newark are questioned. From 1998 to 2006, Booker lived in Brick Towers, one of the city's worst public housing buildings, which some accused to be a tactic for acceptance by his constituents. As the election campaigns escalate, Booker receives endorsements from Spike Lee, Cornel West, and other prominent African American figures.

The movie brings to light many issues plaguing minority communities in Newark and reveals how the city government has failed to acknowledge these issues. The film also raises questions of race and what it means to be "black", as Sharpe James questions Booker's African American heritage and roots to his community.

Curry captures on film corrupt attempts by James and city employees, including both police and code enforcement, to sabotage Booker's campaign by using tactics that include shutting down local businesses that hold Booker fundraisers, demoting city workers who support Booker and demolishing Booker signs in violation of a standing order by a federal judge, in what becomes a true urban political "street fight".

In one memorable scene, city police assault the documentary maker on a public sidewalk for filming the mayor, breaking the microphone off his camera in broad daylight in front of other journalists.

== Aftermath ==
Booker fell short in his 2002 bid to unseat James. In 2006, James decided not to run for a sixth term of office, and Booker defeated Ronald Rice, winning over 70% of the vote. On July 1, 2006, Booker was sworn in as the 36th Mayor of Newark. Booker went on to become a U.S. Senator for New Jersey.

In July 2007, James was indicted on federal charges. He was convicted in 2008 of five counts of fraud and sentenced to 27 months in prison.

James continued to serve in the New Jersey Senate until January 8, 2008.

== Reception ==
Street Fight was nominated for an Academy Award for Best Documentary Feature. It received a 100% fresh rating from Rotten Tomatoes based on 22 reviews, with a weighted average of 8.08/10. The site's consensus reads: "Street Fight takes an immersive ground-level look at a pivotal political race that proves illuminating, entertaining, and inspiring in equal measure". It also has a score of 85 out of 100 on Metacritic, based on 11 critics, indicating "universal acclaim". It was called "extraordinary" by David Denby (The New Yorker), "vastly entertaining" by John Anderson (Variety), and "filmmaking of the first order" by Scott Foundas (LA Weekly).

== Awards ==
- Academy Award, Best Documentary Feature (nominee)
- Emmy Award, Outstanding Continuing Coverage of a News Story: Long Form (nominee)
- Tribeca Film Festival, Audience Award (winner)
- Hot Docs Film Festival, Audience Award (winner)
- Hot Docs Film Festival, Best International Documentary (winner)
- AFI/Discovery Silverdocs Film Festival, Audience Award (winner)
- Ashland Independent Film Festival, Best Documentary (winner)
- WatchDocs Human Rights International Film Festival, Audience Award (winner)
- Chicago International Film Festival, Award for Excellence in Television (winner)
- Cine, Golden Eagle Award (winner)
- IDA, Jacqueline Donnet Filmmaker Award (winner)
- IDA, Distinguished Documentary Achievement Award (nominee)
- Writers Guild of America, Documentary Screenplay Award (nominee)
- American Library Association, VRT Notable Videos

== See also ==
- Brick City - documentary series about Mayor Booker's term in office
- 2014 Newark mayoral election
