= Sharpe James =

37th mayor of Newark, New Jersey (1936–2025)

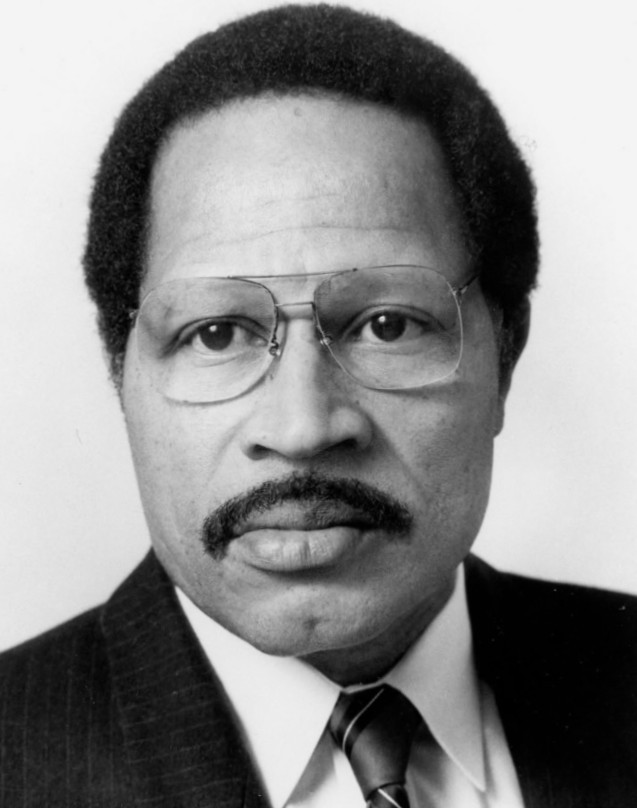
- Official portrait, 1987

Member of the New Jersey Senate from the 29th district
- In office June 21, 1999 – January 8, 2008
- Preceded by: Wynona Lipman
- Succeeded by: Teresa Ruiz

37th Mayor of Newark
- In office July 1, 1986 – June 30, 2006
- Preceded by: Kenneth A. Gibson
- Succeeded by: Cory Booker

68th President of the National League of Cities
- In office 1994
- Preceded by: Donald M. Fraser
- Succeeded by: Carolyn Long Banks

Personal details
- Born: February 20, 1936 Jacksonville, Florida, U.S.
- Died: May 11, 2025 (aged 89) West Orange, New Jersey, U.S.
- Party: Democratic
- Spouse: Mary Mattison
- Children: 3
- Education: Montclair State University (B.A.); Springfield College (M.A.)

Sharpe James (February 20, 1936 – May 11, 2025) was an American politician from New Jersey. A Democrat, he served as the 37th mayor of Newark from 1986 to 2006 and as a state senator for the 29th legislative district from 1999 to 2008. He was the longest-serving mayor in Newark's history and is a subject of the 2005 feature-film Street Fight, which depicts Newark's 2002 mayoral election in which James faced a closer-than-expected challenge from Cory Booker. Once a popular figure in New Jersey politics, his career effectively ended after he was convicted of high-profile corruption charges in 2008.

== Early life and education ==
James was born in Jacksonville, Florida, on February 20, 1936, the son of Louis and Beulah (née Sharpe) James. His father died before he was born, and his mother re-married and moved to Newark in 1940, where James grew up. He graduated from South Side High School (since renamed as Malcolm X Shabazz High School), earned a B.A. in education from Montclair State University and a M.A. in physical education from Springfield College. He received the 1961 Department of Physiology Award from that school, and later completed postgraduate studies at Washington State University, Columbia University, and Rutgers University. He also served with the U.S. Army in Germany. Prior to politics, James worked as a teacher, athletic director, and professor at Essex County College.

== Political career ==
=== City council ===
James was first elected to public office in 1970 as a South Ward Councilman to the Municipal Council of Newark. He was reelected to the council in 1974, defeating his sole opponent by a ten-to-one margin. He was elected to a third term in 1978, and in 1982 he became the first ward councilman elected to an at-large seat. As a councilman, he chaired New Jersey's Black and Hispanic delegation. In 1977 he led an effort to halt landings of Concorde jets at Newark International Airport, claiming it would add to air and noise pollution in the area. In 1983, after talk show host Phil Donahue made comments about Newark being "a place foreigners wouldn't want to visit", James demanded an apology. In response, Donahue sent James a letter apologizing for the remark.

=== Mayor of Newark ===
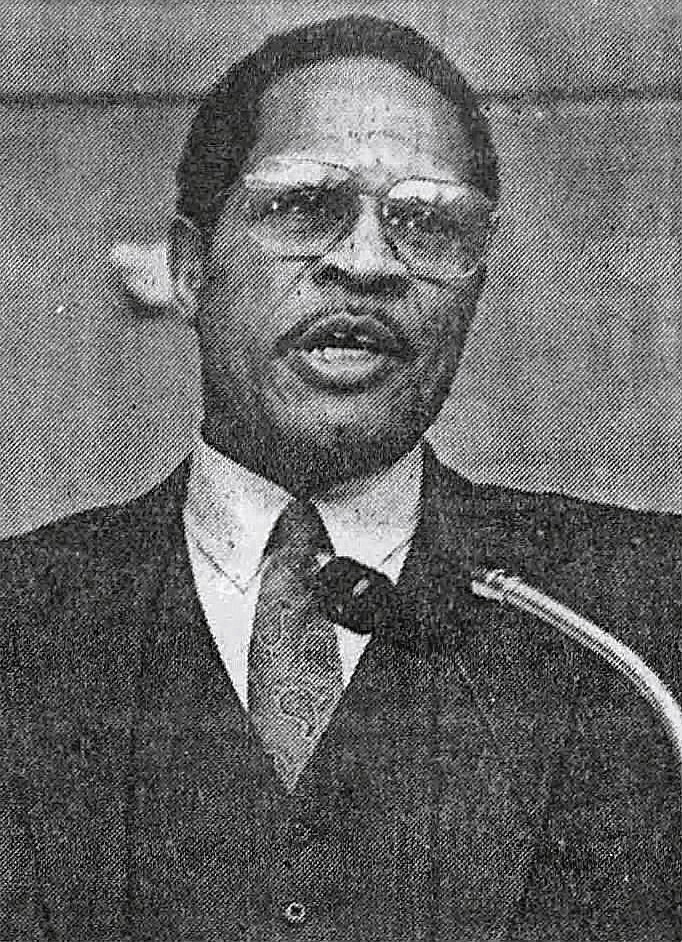
James in 1988

On January 30, 1986, James announced he would run for Mayor of Newark to challenge four-term incumbent Kenneth A. Gibson. James won the May 13 election and was sworn into office on July 1 of that year. He was the first Newark mayor to run unopposed when he sought re-election in 1990 and handily won re-election in 1994 and 1998. James became Newark's longest-serving mayor when he was re-elected for an unprecedented fifth term in 2002, a year after being named "Mayor of the Year" by the New Jersey Conference of Mayors. His 2002 reelection campaign, against then-Councilman Cory Booker, was documented in the 2005 feature film Street Fight. James faced scrutiny over a racist and homophobic statement involving a slur made to Booker during a public confrontation prior to election day, but still was victorious in the tense election.

James became known in his early years as mayor for often wearing jogging suits in public and making high-profile efforts to attract development to Downtown Newark. In 1997, Newark saw the completion of the acclaimed New Jersey Performing Arts Center. James became known as an example of "machine politics". He had a reputation for questionable campaign tactics, including alleged use of the police force for his own purposes, intimidating supporters of his opponents and attacking his opponents' heritage.

In 1987 and 1988, James served as the New Jersey chairman of Jesse Jackson's campaign for the 1988 Democratic Party presidential nomination. In December 1992, James was a member of the New Jersey State Electoral College, one of 15 electors casting their votes for the Clinton/Gore ticket.

In early 1996, James's chief of staff, Jackie Mattison, was charged in federal court with receiving over $17,000 in bribes from an insurance broker from Millburn. He was later sentenced to 41 months in federal prison. He was released in 2000.

In terms of housing, James's policy in the 1990s was to demolish Newark's massive, but mostly abandoned, housing projects, and replace them with small-scale public housing or market rate middle class residences. Following the September 11 terrorist attacks, James offered to assist nearby Jersey City in providing aid for New York City where the attacks occurred.

In 2006, James championed the relocation of the New Jersey Devils to the City of Newark. The Prudential Center is the newest arena in the Newark metropolitan area. On March 16, James filed for re-election as mayor, but announced eleven days later he would not seek a sixth term.

=== State senate ===
In June 1999, while serving as Mayor, James was appointed to the New Jersey Senate to fill out the unexpired term of the late Senator Wynona Lipman, and won election to that seat the following November. He was re-elected for a full term in November 2001 and continued to hold both offices. His Senate district encompassed part of Newark in Essex County and all of the Township of Hillside in Union County.

From 2002 to 2003, James served as Assistant Democratic leader of the senate, and from 2004 to 2005 he served as Assistant Senate Majority leader under Bernard Kenny. He became vice chairman of the Senate budget committee in 2004, serving in that position under Senator Wayne R. Bryant, who was indicted in March 2007 on corruption charges. On April 9, 2007, James announced he would not seek re-election to his State Senate seat.

== Corruption and abuse of power ==
=== Investigations and federal charges ===
In 2005, a New Jersey Open Public Records Act (OPRA) request was submitted asking that James hand over a City Hall-issued debit card he had received in 2002. The OPRA request showed that James had spent over $70,000 with the card for personal expenses over a two-year period. In August 2006, an OPRA request further revealed that James had spent over $80,000 with a credit card provided by the Newark Police Department for several vacations, including a $6,500 vacation to Rio de Janeiro in June of that year. On August 21, the U.S. Attorney's Office, led by U.S. Attorney Chris Christie, issued subpoenas for debit and credit card records for further information. In a response, James claimed no wrongdoing, and explained that, "as the last of the civil rights mayors in America, I had to travel and sell this city and the world about the Newark success story". In September, federal authorities began their own investigation into potential wrongdoing committed by James.

In March 2007, federal investigators subpoenaed documents between James and Tamika Riley, his mistress and a former store operator, under accusations that James rigged the sale of city lots to Riley, who quickly resold them for hundreds of thousands of dollars in profit. The U.S. Attorney's office launched a separate investigation into these allegations later in June.

On July 12, James was indicted by a federal grand jury on 33 federal charges, namely mail fraud and conspiracy. In a press conference regarding the indictment, Christie alleged that James rigged the sale of nine city lots to Riley in a "cut-rate scheme" between 2001 and 2005. Later, he further alleged that James had also misused city-issued credit cards for himself and eight women during out-of-state vacations between 2001 and 2006. At his arraignment, James pleaded not guilty.

=== Trial and conviction ===
On February 26, 2008, James's trial was opened. His lawyers maintained that James had not violated federal law. In the first week, prosecutors presented a video tape of James testifying about Senate Bill 967, which was legislation he sponsored in 2004 to amend the Faulkner Act, with them alleging that James urged the passage of the bill so he could increase his power and illegally benefit himself. The defense counter-argued that James was acting properly in his capacity as a senator and should have enjoyed immunity.

On March 5, prosecutors presented more than a dozen memos from James regarding the land deals, which revealed that he had been monitoring whether city developers he was acquainted with were getting a chance to buy the lots. To prove this, prosecutors called up James's longtime secretary Rose Marie Posella, who testified that James met routinely with developers in his Newark City Hall office. She also testified that Tamika Riley had privileged access to James and that City Hall officials were aware they were having an affair. On April 1, the defense called up former councilwoman Gayle Chaneyfield Jenkins, who testified that the city council set a uniform price for city-owned land for redevelopers and that James had not been involved in the process.

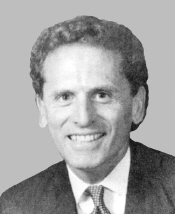
U.S. District Court Judge Bill Martini sentenced James to 27 months in prison despite prosecutors originally recommending a 15-to-20-year sentence.

The jury began deliberations on April 8 and on April 16 they found James guilty on all counts. On May 12, the U.S. Attorney's office announced that the remaining charges against James for his misuse of city-issued credits cards had been dropped, thus sparing him of a second trial. On July 23, Judge Bill Martini upheld the convictions, and on July 29, James was sentenced to 27 months in prison and was ordered to pay a $100,000 fine. Originally, prosecutors urged for a 15-to-20–year sentence for James, but Martini argued that James's years as a public servant played a role in the more lenient sentence. Tamika Riley was also found guilty on those five counts and eight others, including tax evasion. In September 2008, the Federal Bureau of Prisons denied James's request to serve his sentence at a federal prison in Fort Dix and instead reported him to FCI Petersburg in Virginia.

=== Release from prison and lawsuits ===
In June 2009, James's attorney Alan Bowman attempted to convince an appellate court to expunge the convictions, but his efforts failed. On April 6, 2010, James was granted early release after 18 months served. As per a court order, he was banned from running for elected office for the remainder of his career. Seven days after his release, James filed an appeal to reverse his convictions. In September 2010, one of his convictions was overturned, but the four remaining convictions were left unchanged. He further appealed seeking to overturn the convictions due to a juror being dishonest. That appeal was dismissed in February 2013.

In 2011, the New Jersey Election Law Enforcement Commission filed a lawsuit against James alleging that he and his campaign treasurer, Cheryl Johnson, improperly used about $94,000 in campaign funds to pay for legal fees. On August 17, 2012, the New Jersey Superior Court ruled in favor of the commission and ordered that both James and Johnson had to pay the money back. In January 2015, a state appeals court struck down an appeal by James and upheld the higher court's ruling.

== Post-conviction career ==
In 2013, James published a 17-chapter book titled Political Prisoner, which he had written in prison. That same year, he advised the election campaign of his son John Sharpe James, who won a seat on the Municipal Council of Newark. That same year James endorsed Cory Booker, a former foe he had defeated in the 2002 Newark mayoral race, in the special election for U.S. Senator to replace the late Frank Lautenberg.

In 2022, James attempted to run for office as an at-large candidate for Newark City Council despite a court order banning him from running for a public elected office. His certification was denied by Newark City Clerk Kenneth Louis on March 3, 2022. James attempted to sue after his candidacy was rejected, arguing that while he was prohibited from holding public office, running as a candidate was not prohibited. A judge dismissed his suit and James declined to appeal the dismissal.

== Personal life and death ==
James and his wife, Mary (née Mattison), had three sons. He died at a care home in West Orange, New Jersey, on May 11, 2025, at the age of 89.

== Awards and honors ==
In 1988, James was awarded an Honorary Doctor of Laws degree from Montclair State University, and, in 1991, an Honorary Doctorate from Drew University.

== See also ==
- 2002 Newark mayoral election
- List of mayors of Newark, New Jersey

Political offices
Preceded by Kenneth A. Gibson	Mayor of Newark; 1986–2006	Succeeded by Cory Booker
New Jersey Senate
Preceded by Wynona Lipman	Member of the New Jersey Senate from the 29th district 1999–2008	Succeeded by Teresa Ruiz
