= 2010 Newark mayoral election =

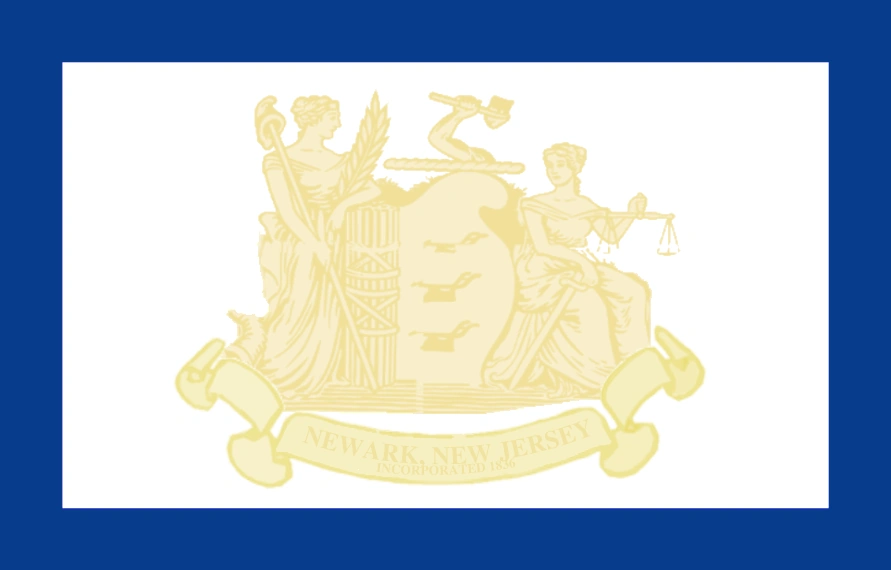
- May 11, 2010
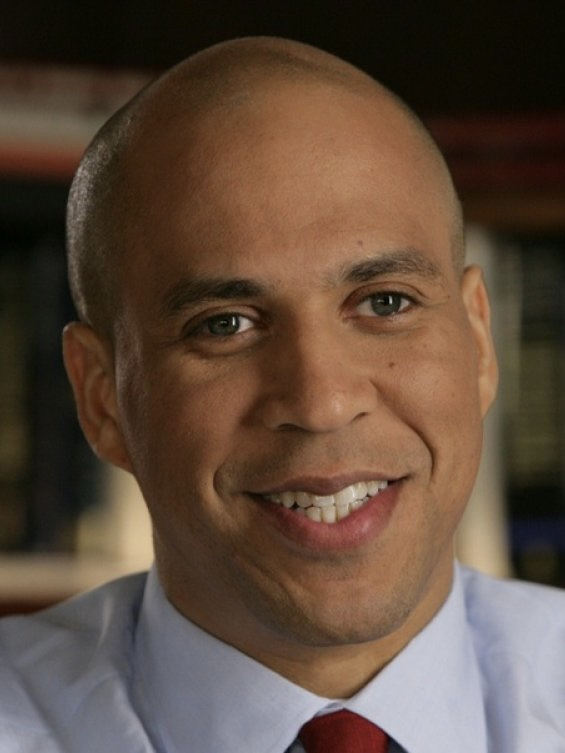

Candidate	Cory Booker	Clifford J. Minor
Party	Nonpartisan	Nonpartisan
Popular vote	22,745	13,570
Percentage	59.1%	35.3%
Mayor before election
Cory Booker
Democratic
Elected mayor
Cory Booker
Democratic

The 2010 election for Mayor of Newark took place in Newark, the most populous city in the state of New Jersey, on May 11, 2010. Elections for all seats on the nine member Municipal Council of Newark were held the same day. A runoff election, if necessary, would have taken place. Elections in the city are non-partisan and candidates are not listed by political party. Incumbent Mayor Cory Booker avoided a runoff and was re-elected to his second term in office.

Booker would not serve out the entirety of his second term. In 2013, after having won the October 16 special election for U.S. senator, Booker resigned as mayor and was sworn in on October 31 as the junior U.S. senator from New Jersey. Luis A. Quintana, long-term member of the Municipal Council, replaced him as interim mayor. In 2019, he mounted a campaign to participate in 2020 Democratic Party presidential primaries.

== Results ==
If no candidate had received 50% of the vote, the race would have continued to a run-off between the top two candidates from the first round.

Newark mayoral election, 2010
Party	Candidate	Votes	%
Nonpartisan	Cory Booker (incumbent)	22,745	59.1
Nonpartisan	Clifford J. Minor	13,570	35.3
Nonpartisan	Yvonne Garrett Moore	1,703	4.4
Nonpartisan	Mirna L. White	444	1.2
Total votes		38,462	100.00
