= 1998 Newark mayoral election =

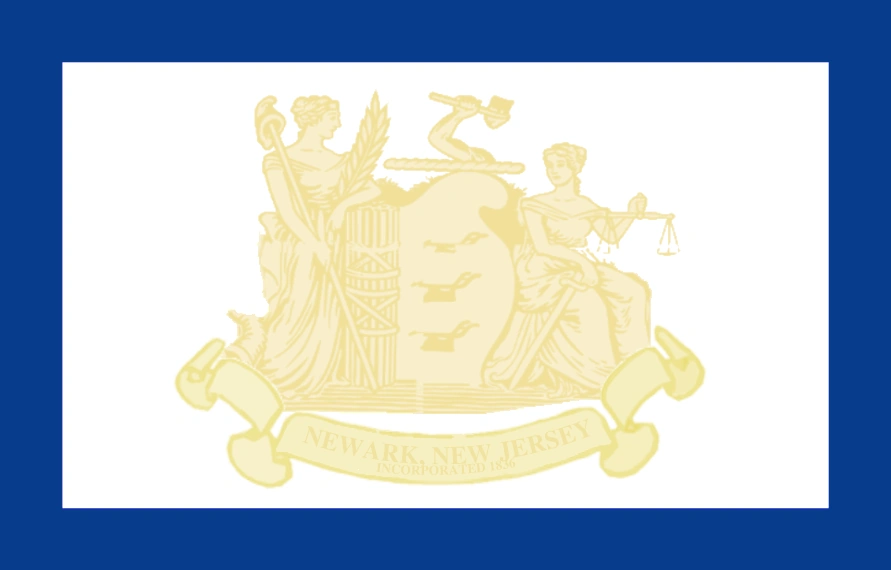
- May 12, 1998
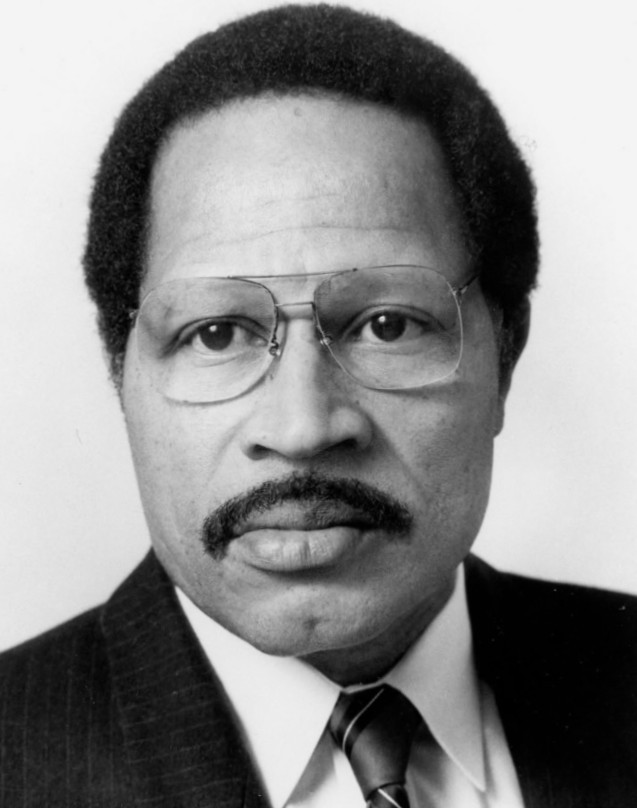

Candidate	Sharpe James	Ronald Rice	Mildred Crump
Party	Nonpartisan	Nonpartisan	Nonpartisan
Popular vote	23,402	11,513	7,158
Percentage	55.6%	27.4%	17.0%
Mayor before election
Sharpe James
Democratic
Elected mayor
Sharpe James
Democratic

The 1998 election for Mayor of Newark took place in Newark, the most populous city in the state of New Jersey, on May 12, 1998. Elections for all seats on the nine-member Municipal Council of Newark were held the same day. A runoff election, if necessary, would have taken place. Elections in the city are non-partisan and candidates are not listed by political party. Incumbent Mayor Sharpe James was re-elected to his fourth term in office.

== Candidates ==
=== Declared ===
- Sharpe James, incumbent Mayor of Newark
- Ronald L. Rice, state senator for the 28th legislative district
- Mildred C. Crump, councilperson on the Municipal Council of Newark

Though all elections are non-partisan, all candidates are registered Democrats and Newark is a heavily Democratic city.

== Campaign ==
Although Rice and Crump were originally allies of James, they had accused him of ignoring the city's rising unemployment rate, failing schools (which at this point were under state takeover), and taking credit for the accomplishments of others.

== Results ==
If no candidate received 50% of the vote, the race would have continued to a run-off between the top two candidates from the first round.

James received 55.6% of the total vote, securing re-election.

Results
Party	Candidate	Votes	%
Nonpartisan	Sharpe James (incumbent)	23,402	55.6%
Nonpartisan	Ronald Rice	11,513	27.4%
Nonpartisan	Mildred C. Crump	7,158	17.0%
Total votes		42,073	100.00
