= Public Health Advisor =

The Public Health Advisor, or "PHA" is a type of public health worker which was established in 1948 by the United States Public Health Service in the Venereal Disease Control Division. Today they are hired primarily by the U.S. Centers for Disease Control and Prevention (CDC) and serve in many public health programs. This type of worker is unique in public health, because they begin their service at the entry level of public health doing what is known as "field work" or "contact epidemiology" which refers to the interviewing and locating of people who have been exposed to an infectious disease so as to offer them treatment and to reduce the epidemic. Following their initial work experiences, PHAs are exposed to a variety of public health programs across the United States, learning to function at all levels of the public health system. During their time of service, PHAs are called upon to respond to public health or humanitarian crisis. This article will briefly describe the history of the Public Health Advisor and will mention a few notable contributions made over the course of their history with the Public Health Service and later with the Centers for Disease Control and Prevention.

== History and Purpose ==
The United States Public Health Service has historically placed personnel in local areas to assist with disease outbreaks or to advise various public health programs. Medical officers and other personnel such as environmental health officers, nurses or in some cases technical workers like laboratorians would be sent to local and state health departments for temporary assignments. Though the Public Health Advisor is an example of this type of locally placed personnel, it was not until the 1940s that the U.S. federal government placed public health workers to do anything more than advise or assist local public health efforts.

The purpose of the Public Health Advisor, or "PHA," was to help implement venereal disease "VD" programs (as they were known at the time, now known as STDs for sexually transmitted disease) because the job of controlling VD was not entirely effective. For example, in 1935 U.S. health surveys indicated that at any one time, 683,000 persons were under treatment and observation for syphilis. This same year saw 518,000 new infections, 100,000 of them among persons under twenty years of age. By the end of World War II, it was estimated that one in ten persons would have syphilis in their lifetime. The disease was devastating if untreated, causing more than fifteen percent of all blindness, fifty percent of perinatal blindness, and eighteen percent of deaths from heart disease. In the late 1930s, 60,000 children were born each year with congenital syphilis. Following both World Wars (I and II), syphilis was seeded in the population because the public health infrastructure was not funded well enough to respond to cases of the disease. Physicians were not consistently reporting to the local health authorities when patients were diagnosed with syphilis, and (more importantly), the sexual partners of patients were not being identified or contacted so that they too might be offered curative treatment for syphilis. As such, syphilis was prevalent in the U.S. population, such that the federal government opted to initiate help to local venereal disease programs in states and local areas.

The kind of help needed was more than advice to programs. Advisors had been provided to the state and local public health departments during the 1940s; however, cases of syphilis remained. What was needed was help with the patients themselves – a task called contact epidemiology which involved interviewing people who were newly diagnosed with syphilis, identifying their sexual partners, and then going out into the community to locate these partners and bringing them into the clinic or to their physicians for examination and, if necessary, treatment. This job was the job of the venereal disease investigator; a job that was being done in some of the local areas, but neither uniformly nor effectively.

To meet the need for VD investigators, the VD Division of the U.S. Public Health Service hired a small group of college graduates to work as VD investigators for the federal government. These initial recruits were assigned to work on the Eastern Shore of Maryland.

== Contributions of Public Health Advisors ==
After their introduction in 1948, the Public Health Advisor became an important part of the public health infrastructure of local and state health departments. In 1957 when the Public Health Service transferred the Venereal Disease Division to the Communicable Disease Center in Atlanta (which later became the Centers for Disease Control and Prevention), PHAs were quickly recognized as an asset to other public health efforts because they were trained in phlebotomy (drawing of blood through venipuncture), they knew how to organize mass testing and could investigate diseases, and they could manage public health programs.

Public Health Advisors were soon called upon by the CDC to help with polio efforts in 1961, they built the national Immunization Program following the passage of the Vaccine Assistance Act of 1962, they were soon recruited to work in the Tuberculosis Program, and by 1992 could be found in virtually all of CDC programs working at local, state and federal levels of the public health system.

In addition to their regular assignments in the public health system, PHAs are called upon to respond to disease outbreaks or health disaster. Establishing a locally trained and geographically varied workforce has allowed CDC to have ready and deployable human resources for emergencies or emerging needs anywhere in the world. PHAs are part of a deployable team that can be credited with the eradication of smallpox, the identification of new strains of disease, and the halting of epidemics. PHAs have been called to respond to outbreaks of disease such as hantavirus, Lassa fever, monkeypox, encephalitis, tuberculosis, measles, AIDS, smallpox, polio, Legionnella, Guillain–Barré syndrome, SARS, syphilis, PPNG, babesiosis, and cholera.

PHAs were assigned to work in health campaigns such as Guinea worm, malaria, syphilis, diarrheal diseases, yellow fever, yaws, swine flu, and measles. PHAs have been sent to respond to major events such as floods, hurricanes, volcanic eruptions, earthquakes, and the anthrax scare in the U.S. They even were assigned to be poll watchers in select Southern states during the 1972 and 1976 presidential elections.

== See also ==
- Tuskegee syphilis experiment
