= Amina Baraka =

American writer (born 1942)

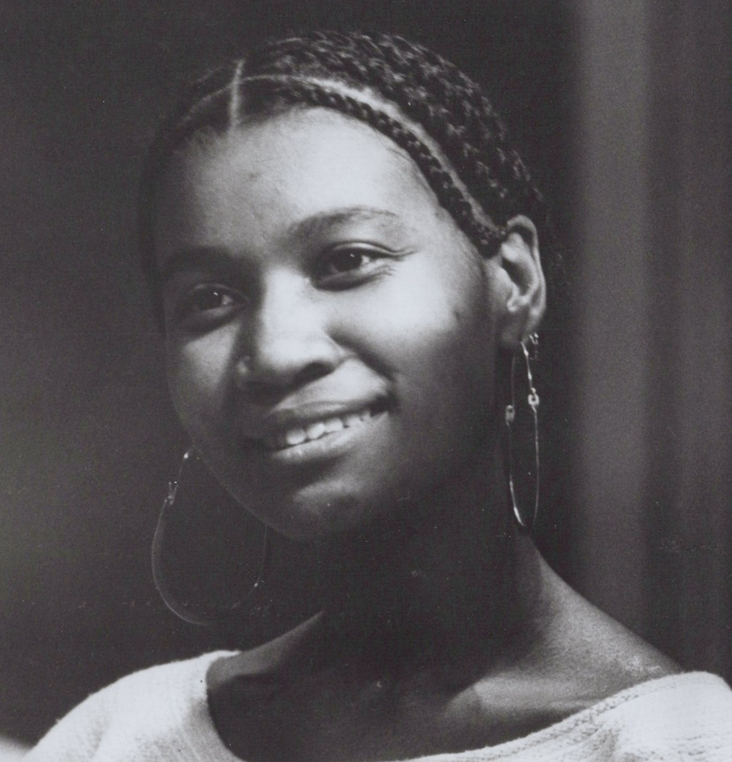
- Baraka c. 1960s
- Born: Sylvia Robinson; December 5, 1942 (age 83); Charlotte, North Carolina, U.S.
- Occupations: Actress; community organizer; writer; poet; activist
- Spouse: Amiri Baraka (m. 1966; died 2014)
- Children: 7, inc. Ras Baraka

Amina Baraka (born Sylvia Robinson; December 5, 1942) is an American poet, actress, author, community organiser, singer, dancer, and activist associated with the Black Arts Movement. Her contributions to African American cultural and political life in Newark, New Jersey and her work as a community organiser, educator, and artist built her career as an activist. She was involved in the development of alternative educational initiatives such as liberation schools. She played a leadership role in organisations including the Congress of Afrikan People (CAP) and the Black Women’s United Front (BWUF). Her poetic themes are about social justice, family, and women.

In addition to her literary work, she has been active in film, theatre and music. She has frequently collaborated with her husband, Amiri Baraka, another important figure in the Black Arts Movement.

== Biography ==
=== Early life ===
Born in Charlotte, North Carolina, and raised in Newark, New Jersey, she graduated in 1960 from Newark Arts High School. After graduating, she became a dancer, actress, and poet. As an artist, she became a part of the Black Arts Movement in Newark. She performed at the Cellar located at the Jazz Arts Society.

Amina's mother, who did not believe in abortion, had her at sixteen. Amina was mostly raised by her grandparents, and Amina grew up viewing her family's community involvement as a form of “cultural work,” which later shaped her own engagement in political and cultural organizing. By the 1940s, her mother and grandfather were already among Newark's first African American labor organizers, turning their apartment into an important gathering place for neighbors. This space was used not only for meetings but also for music, as her grandparents played a variety of instruments, including the guitar, harmonica, and piano. Her grandmother played a key role in caring for the community by preparing meals, providing clothing, and ensuring that the children were clean and well-cared-for.

=== Personal life ===
In 1959, when she was in high school, she became pregnant at the age of sixteen and had to drop out of school. The next year, she married Walter Wilson, with whom she had two daughters. She divorced him five years later. Then she married Amiri Baraka in 1966, and together they had five children, including Ras Baraka, who is the 40th and the current mayor of Newark, New Jersey.

Amina was born Sylvia Robinson, but she changed her name for Amina Baraka. She was called Bibi Amina Baraka, which means in Swahili "lady", as the wife of Amiri Baraka, who himself had changed his name from LeRoi Jones. Their new names were given by Hesham Jaaber as part of the Kawaida movement, which encouraged African Americans to abandon Christian names and adopt African or Arabic names to assert African cultural identity. The name Amina also has religious significance, as it was the name of the mother of the Islamic prophet Muhammad.

== Career ==
Amina Baraka was the founder of the African Free School, established in 1965 in Newark, New Jersey. It was a liberation school for community children. The creation of African Free School in Newark, New Jersey was supported by her husband, Amiri Baraka. It was later renamed Marcus Garvey School in 1970, as it was inspired by the founder of the Universal Negro Improvement Association (UNIA), Marcus Garvey, and his will to improve the educational system especially for black people. Liberation schools, also called freedom schools, were created during the 1960s by the Black activists in order to give the opportunity to study an alternative medium for black students unable to attend regular educational institutions due to the school boycotts after Brown v. Board. She is one of the founding members of the Newark Art Society in 1963. She performed at the Cellar which was a place where artists from everywhere came to perform for a short time. It was the center for Jazz and Art in Newark. There, Amina Baraka wrote and performed dance dramas. She also opened the Spirit House in Newark, with her husband, Amiri Baraka, which is a facility in which there was a combination of playhouse and artist's residence.

=== Activism ===
In the early 1960s, Amina Baraka briefly joined the Nation of Islam after attending a speech by Malcolm X in Newark. She left shortly after due to restrictions on women, such as not being able to dance or go out alone at sundown. This experience exposed her to Black nationalist ideas, which later influenced her work in art and activism addressing the historical and cultural experiences of African Americans.

As an activist, Amina Baraka was actively involved with the Congress of Afrikan People (CAP), previously called the Committee for a United Newark, which was founded by Amiri Baraka in 1970. She managed the Women's Division, using her competence as an activist and a cultural artist.

Amina Baraka was also involved in the founding of the Black Women’s United Front (BWUF) in 1974, an organization created by women within the Congress of AfriKan People (CAP) to address the social, cultural, and political conditions of African American women. The group sought to challenge what it described as the “triple oppression” of Black women through political education and ideological discussion. Although short-lived, the BWUF reflected broader efforts within Black nationalist movements to expand the role and political consciousness of African American women.

== Works ==
=== Poetry ===
Amina Baraka's poetry explores African American history, ancestry, and culture. Her work often highlights the voices of Black women and shows how art and music have been used as means of survival and cultural expression. In poems such as HIP SONGS, she connects historical traditions with contemporary Black art forms, emphasizing the continuity of Black cultural heritage.

- 1978: Songs for the Masses (co-authored with Amiri Baraka)
- 2014: Blues in All Hues

=== Edited works ===
- 1983: Confirmation: An Anthology of African American Women (co-edited with Amiri Baraka)
- 1987: The Music: Reflections on Jazz and Blues (co-edited with Amiri Baraka)
- 1992: 5 Boptrees (co-edited with Amiri Baraka)

=== Film credits ===
- 2002: Strange Fruit
- 2006: The Pact
- 2007: Keep it Clean
- 2009: Comme tout le monde
- 2016: Word Warriors III
- 2016: Why is we Americans?
- 2025: The Dutchman

=== Onstage ===
She performed in many stage productions produced by Amiri Baraka.

- A Black Mass
- Slave Ship
- Mad Heart
- Home on the Range

=== Recordings ===
- 2004: The Shani Project (co-produced with Amiri Baraka)
- 2008: Variations in Time: A Jazz Perspective
- 2017: Amina Baraka & the Red Microphone

=== Director ===
- Blue Ark: The Word (co-directed with Amiri Baraka)

== Awards and honors ==
- 2015: She received a certification of appreciation from the Black Nia F.O.R.C.E. (Freedom Organization for Racial and Cultural Enlightenment).
- 2015: She received a Lifetime Achievement award by the New York Friends of People's World newspaper.

== Legacy ==
Amina Baraka is recognised as an important figure in the Black Arts Movement and in the cultural history of Newark. Her contributions to community-based education and artistic production have been noted in academic studies of the movement. Her work reflects the intersection of art and activism, particularly in the context of African-American cultural and political life in the late 20th century.

During her lifetime, Amina contributed to many major events through her writing. "Haiti", published in 1982, was one of her works that encouraged awareness of the refugee crisis. Later she and her husband Amiri Baraka founded Kimako's Blues People, an art space that featured Newark artists. Her poetry was in the anthology Unsettling America: An Anthology of Contemporary Multicultural Poetry and also included in a collection called Bum Rush the Page: A Def Poetry Jam.
