= Lisa Jones =

American writer (born 1961)

- Born: August 15, 1961 (age 65)
- Education: Yale University (B.A.); New York University (M.F.A.)
- Occupations: Author; journalist; playwright
- Years active: 1961–present
- Spouse: Kenneth S. Brown
- Parent(s): Hettie Jones and Amiri Baraka

Lisa Victoria Chapman Jones (born August 15, 1961) is an American playwright, essayist, journalist, and memoirist.

== Personal life and education ==
Jones grew up in New York City and Newark, New Jersey. She is the daughter of poets Hettie Jones and Amiri Baraka (formerly known as LeRoi Jones). Jones graduated from Yale University and received a MFA in Film from New York University. She married Kenneth S. Brown in 2004 and their daughter was born in 2005. She is Jewish.

Her sister, Kellie Jones, is an associate professor in the Department of Art History and Archaeology at Columbia University. Jones has a half-brother, Newark, New Jersey, mayor Ras Baraka, and a half-sister, Dominique di Prima, from Amiri's relationship with Diane di Prima.

== Journalism ==
Jones joined the staff of the Village Voice in 1984 and wrote for the paper for 15 years. She was known for her "Skin Trade" columns in the Village Voice, a selection of which were published as a book, Bulletproof Diva, in 1994.

== Published works ==
Jones published a memoir, Good Girl in a Bad Dress, in 1999. She also co-wrote three books with Spike Lee, all companion books to his films: Uplift the Race: The Construction of School Daze, published in 1988, Do the Right Thing, published in 1989, and Mo' Better Blues, published in 1990. Her essays have been widely anthologized. One anthology is Bulletproof Diva: Tales of Race, Sex and Hair.

== Plays ==
Jones wrote the plays Carmella & King Kong and Combination Skin while involved with the Rodeo Caldonia, a feminist collective of African-American women artists. Combination Skin went on to premiere at Company One in Hartford, CT, in 1992. The New York Times Theater review called her "a fresh talent" and praised her "all-consuming vision". Combination Skin was anthologized in Contemporary Plays by Women of Color. Jones also created three works for the New American Radio series of National Public Radio: Aunt Aida's Hand (1989), Stained (1991), and Ethnic Cleansing (1993). Aunt Aida's Hand and Stained were collaborations with Alva Rogers, who was also a Rodeo Caldonia member. In 1995, Jones and Rogers received a joint choreography and creator Bessie Award for their collaborative work.
