= Derin Young =

Cultural programmer, producer, songwriter

Derin Young is an American cultural programmer, producer, songwriter, sound designer, and vocalist. She was a member of Rodeo Caldonia High Fidelity Performance Theater.

== Biography ==
Derin Young was raised in New York City. Young has produced content for Black Art In America, Columbus Museum, Crystal Bridges Museum of American Art, Bentonville, AR, De La Cruz Collection, Miami, FL and Institute Contemporary Art (ICA) San Diego, CA among numerous other organizations. Derin was featured as part of the Rodeo Caldonia High Fidelity Performance Theater in the exhibition, We Wanted A Revolution : Black Radical Women Artists 1950 - 1985 (from 2017 - 2018 — Brooklyn Museum, California African American Museum, ICA Boston). As a vocalist and songwriter, Young has worked alongside such artists as Baba Olatunji, Lenny Kravitz with Vanessa Paradis, Living Colour, M.C. Solaar and many more. In 2021, Young was acknowledged for best sound design by WT FRINGE Women's Theatre Festival for the play "Life Before Reconstruction" by Alva Rogers. Derin works as a cultural programmer and producer. Young, curated and produced the Street Level performance series at Oceanside Museum of Art (OMA) in Southern California. Derin is currently an events producer at the Institute of Contemporary Art in San Diego and is the creator of an arts and education Podcast called the audioPERKULATOR®.

== Career ==
Derin has performed throughout North America, Europe, Indian Ocean, and Japan. Some of her collaborative performance credits include: MC Solaar (Polydor/Polygram, France), Vanessa Paradis (Live (Vanessa Paradis album) on Remark/Polygram, France, produced by Lenny Kravitz) and Living Colour ("Time's Up", Epic Records). Derin is a producer and program manager for Street Art Revolution.
