= Hettie Jones =

American poet (1934–2024)

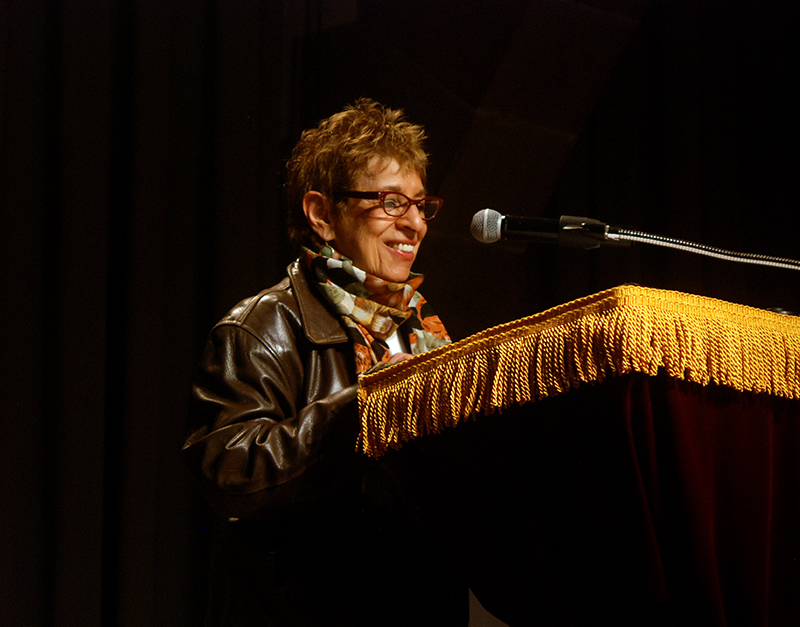
- Jones in 2019
- Born: Hettie Cohen; June 15, 1934; Brooklyn, New York, U.S.
- Died: August 13, 2024 (aged 90); Philadelphia, Pennsylvania, U.S.
- Occupations: Writer, poet
- Notable work: How I became Hettie Jones
- Movement: Beat Generation
- Spouse: Amiri Baraka (m. 1958; div. 1964)
- Children: Kellie Jones; Lisa Jones

Hettie Jones (née Cohen; June 15, 1934 – August 13, 2024) was an American poet. She wrote 23 books that include a memoir of the Beat Generation, three volumes of poetry, and publications for children and young adults, including The Trees Stand Shining and Big Star Fallin' Mama: Five Women in Black Music.

== Early life ==
Hettie Jones was born Hettie Cohen on June 15, 1934, in Brooklyn, New York, to a Jewish family. She was raised in Laurelton, Queens. She entered Mary Washington College in Virginia in 1952. She had not traveled far from her home until college, and had not experienced antisemitism up until that time: "The roommates didn't want to live with me because I was a Jew."

== Career ==
After graduating from college and returning to New York, Jones married LeRoi Jones (later known as Amiri Baraka), an African-American writer. Her family initially disowned her for marrying a Black man, but her husband's family was welcoming. Despite living in the diverse Lower East Side of Manhattan, they were sometimes harassed in public for being an interracial couple.

In 1957, the couple founded the literary magazine Yugen, and launched the publication house Totem Press. They published early works by Beat Generation figures Allen Ginsberg, Jack Kerouac, and Frank O'Hara, all of whom they'd befriended as well.

By 1964, LeRoi had become active in the Black Arts movement and their marriage was deteriorating. While still married to Hettie, he fathered a daughter, Dominique di Prima, with poet Diane DiPrima. LeRoi divorced Hettie and moved to Harlem. She continued writing, editing, and teaching.

Jones published her memoir, How I Became Hettie Jones, in 1990. She detailed the experiences of growing up among a Jewish family and community, being part of the Beat Generation, her early writing, and the social difficulties of being in an interracial marriage and raising biracial children. In 1999, Jones won the Poetry Society of America’s Norma Farber First Book Award for her first volume of poetry titled Drive. According to Booklist, the publication of Drive is what established Jones as a “potent and fearless poet.”

Jones was a longtime editor and taught poetry, fiction, and memoir at many universities, including Penn State University, NYU, the 92nd Street Y, University of Wyoming, and Parsons School of Design. Jones was a former chair of the PEN Prison Writing Committee, and from 1989 to 2002 she ran a writing workshop at the Bedford Hills Correctional Facility for Women. This workshop hailed as an inspiration for Jones’ nationally distributed collection, Aliens At The Border. Jones also co-authored a memoir for Rita Marley, widow of Bob Marley. More recently, Jones received grants to begin a writing program on Manhattan's Lower East Side at the Lower East Side Girls Club Center for Community. Her book, Love, H, a selection from 40 years of correspondence with the sculptor Helene Dorn, was published by Duke University Press in October 2016.

== Personal life ==
Jones has two daughters from her marriage to Amiri Baraka: Kellie Jones (born 1959) and Lisa Jones Brown (born 1961). They are educators and writers.

Jones resided in the same East Village apartment at 27 Cooper Square that she and LeRoi moved into in 1962. She successfully spearheaded a campaign in 2005 to save her apartment building when it was to be demolished to build a hotel.

Jones continued to teach and write. She died in Philadelphia on August 13, 2024, at the age of 90.

== Works ==
- How I became Hettie Jones: A Memoir
- Drive
- Big Star Fallin’ Mama -- Five Women in Black Music
- No Woman No Cry
- All Told
- Doing 70
