= Rodeo Caldonia =

American Performance Collective

Rodeo Caldonia also known as Rodeo Caldonia High Fidelty Performance Theater was a black feminist arts collective based in Fort Greene, Brooklyn during the 1980s. The collective, which operated from about 1985-1988, included nearly 20 African American women who wanted to create feminist work that focused on their identities as Black women. The collective was founded by Lisa Jones and Alva Rogers.

== Influences ==
The members of the Rodeo Caldonia were inspired by other performance collectives, such as the International Sweethearts of Rhythm, the 1940s integrated, all-women big band, Sweet Honey in the Rock, all-woman, African-American a cappella ensemble, and the New York-based Black women’s dance group, Urban Bush Women.

"She Came with the Rodeo"

...fancying the inheritance of B.B. King and sundry blues songs that told of “hardheaded” brown girls with pretty lips. Caldonia, B. B. sings, why is your big head so hard? A rodeo brought folks together to stir up dust...Rodeo Caldonia, it was.

— Lisa Jones, Bulletproof Diva (1994)

== Performances ==
In 1985, Rodeo Caldonia High-Fidelity Performance Theater staged their first performance. While an active organization, the collective produced two plays Carmella & King Kong and Combination Skin and one poetry revue, “Welcome to the Black Aesthetic,” that was not publicly performed.

Carmella & King Kong was billed as “an act of jungle love” between Kong and the pagan goddess Carmella, who eventually loses her mind. The play was performed with photographed projected on stage above the actors. Lisa Jones recalled that the group was “taken to task” for including photographs of “bare black breasts” next to an image of Fannie Lou Hamer. Actress Sandye Wilson played the character "Torch Singer".

Combination Skin was described by Lisa Jones as "a one-act comedy...about a futuristic game show called $100,000 Tragic Mulatto, which "explores the tragic mulatto myth and the American crossover dream." Rodeo Caldonia first produced Combination Skin in a workshop at St. Mark's Church in New York City in December 1986. The play later premiered at Company One in Hartford, CT, in 1992. Combination Skin went on to premiere at Company One in Hartford, CT, in 1992. The New York Times Theater review called her "a fresh talent" and praised her "all-consuming vision". Combination Skin was anthologized in Contemporary Plays by Women of Color.

== Membership ==
Rodeo Caldonia artists over the years included several Black women artists who were writers, actors, and musicians:

1. Donna Berwick, costume designer
2. Chakaia Booker
3. Celina Davis, dancer and writer
4. Raye Dowell, actress
5. Candace Hamilton
6. Kellie Jones, writer and art historian
7. Lisa Jones, playwright and journalist
8. Suzanne Kelly
9. Alice Norris, artist
10. Alva Rogers, actress and singer
11. Daphne Rubin-Vega, dancer, singer-songwriter
12. Lorna Simpson, photographer
13. Stephanie L. Jones
14. Suzanne Y. Jones
15. Pamala Tyson, actress
16. Amber Sunshower Villenueva, actress
17. Sandye Wilson, actress and director
18. Derin Young, producer, singer / songwriter

== Remembered ==
In 2015, collective co-founders Lisa Jones and Alva Rogers reminiscent with cultural critic Greg Tate at an event titled "Remembering Rodeo Caldonia" at the Pillow Cafe Lounge in Brooklyn.

The history of Rodeo Caldonia was included in the 2017 travelling exhibition and accompanied sourcebook, We Wanted a Revolution: Black Radical Women, 1965-1985, sponsored by the Brooklyn Museum. The exhibition was presented at the Brooklyn Museum, the California African American Museum, the Albright-Knox Art Gallery, and the Institute of Contemporary Art/Boston. The California African American Museum hosted a talk called "The Life and Times of Rodeo Caldonia". Panelists included Lisa Jones and Alva Rogers and Derin Young.

== External Sources ==
High Performance, a performance arts magazine, Issue #35, 1986. Includes photo of the collective.

Interview magazine, 1986. Includes photograph of members of the collective.
