= Amiri Baraka =

African-American writer (1934–2014)

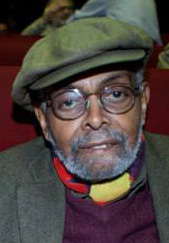
- Baraka in 2013
- Born: Everett Leroy Jones; October 7, 1934; Newark, New Jersey, U.S.
- Died: January 9, 2014 (aged 79); Newark, New Jersey, U.S.
- Occupations: Actor; teacher; theater director; theater producer; writer; activist; poet
- Spouses: Hettie Cohen (m. 1958; div. 1964) Sylvia Robinson (m. 1966)
- Children: Kellie Jones; Lisa Jones; Dominique di Prima; Maria Jones; Shani Baraka; Obalaji Baraka; Ras J. Baraka; Ahi Baraka; Amiri Baraka Jr.
- Writing career
- Pen name: LeRoi Jones, Imamu Amear Baraka
- Years active: 1961–2014
- Genres: Poetry and drama
- Movement: Black Arts
- Military career
- Allegiance: United States
- Branch: United States Air Force
- Service years: 1954–1957
- Website: www.amiribaraka.com

Amiri Baraka (born Everett Leroy Jones; October 7, 1934 – January 9, 2014), previously known as LeRoi Jones and Imamu Amear Baraka, was an American writer of poetry, drama, fiction, essays, and music criticism. He was the author of numerous books of poetry and taught at several universities, including the University at Buffalo and Stony Brook University. He received the PEN/Beyond Margins Award in 2008 for Tales of the Out and the Gone. Baraka's plays, poetry, and essays have been described by scholars as constituting defining texts for African-American culture.

Baraka's career spanned nearly 52 years, and his themes range from Black liberation to White racism. His notable works of criticism and poetry include "The Music: Reflection on Jazz and Blues", "The Book of Monk", and "New Music, New Poetry", works that draw on topics from the worlds of society, music, and literature.

Baraka's poetry and writing have attracted both high praise and condemnation. In the African-American community, some compare Baraka to James Baldwin and recognize him as one of the most respected and most widely published Black writers of his generation, though some have said his work is an expression of violence, misogyny, and homophobia. Baraka's brief tenure as Poet Laureate of New Jersey (in 2002 and 2003) involved controversy over a public reading of his poem "Somebody Blew Up America?", which resulted in accusations of antisemitism and negative attention from critics and politicians over his assertion that the US and Israeli governments had advance knowledge of the September 11 attacks.

Baraka's son, Ras Baraka, is the current mayor of Newark, New Jersey.

== Biography ==
Baraka was born in Newark, New Jersey, where he attended Barringer High School. His father Coyt Leroy Jones worked as a postal supervisor and lift operator. His mother Anna Lois (née Russ) was a social worker. Jazz interested Baraka as a child. He wanted to emulate Miles Davis: "I wanted to look like that too—that green shirt and rolled up sleeves on Milestones ... always wanted to look like that. And be able to play "On Green Dolphin Street" or "Autumn Leaves". ... That gorgeous chilling sweet sound. That's the music you wanted playing when you was coming into a joint, or just looking up at the sky with your baby by your side, that mixture of America and them changes, them blue African magic chants." The influence of jazz can be seen throughout his work later in life.

He won a scholarship to Rutgers University in 1951 but transferred in 1952 to Howard University. His classes in philosophy and religious studies helped lay a foundation for his later writings. While at Howard, he ran cross country. He subsequently studied at Columbia University and The New School without taking a degree.

In 1954, he joined the United States Air Force as a gunner, reaching the rank of sergeant. This was a decision he would come to regret. He once explained: "I found out what it was like to be under the direct jurisdiction of people who hated black people. I had never known that directly." This experience was yet another that influenced Baraka's later work. His commanding officer received an anonymous letter accusing Baraka of being a communist. This led to the discovery of Soviet writings in Baraka's possession, his reassignment to gardening duty, and subsequently a dishonorable discharge for violation of his oath of duty. He later described his experience in the military as "racist, degrading, and intellectually paralyzing". While he was stationed in Puerto Rico, he worked at the base library, which allowed him ample reading time, and it was here that, inspired by Beat poets back in the mainland US, he began to write poetry.

The same year, he moved to Greenwich Village, working initially in a warehouse of music records. His interest in jazz evolved during this period. It was also during this time that he came in contact with the avant-garde Black Mountain poets and New York School poets. In 1958 he married Hettie Cohen, with whom he had two daughters, Kellie Jones (b. 1959) and Lisa Jones (b.1961). He and Hettie founded Totem Press, which published such Beat poets as Jack Kerouac and Allen Ginsberg. In cooperation with Corinth, Totem published books by LeRoi Jones and Diane di Prima, Ron Loewinsohn, Michael McClure, Charles Olson, Paul Blackburn, Frank O'Hara, Gary Snyder, Philip Whalen, Ed Dorn, Joel Oppenheimer and Gilbert Sorrentino and an anthology of four young female poets, Carol Berge, Barbara Moraff, Rochelle Owens, and Diane Wakoski. They also jointly founded a quarterly literary magazine, Yugen, which ran for eight issues (1958–1962). Through a party that Baraka organized, Ginsberg was introduced to Langston Hughes while Ornette Coleman played saxophone.

Baraka also worked as editor and critic for the literary and arts journal Kulchur (1960–65). With Diane di Prima he edited the first twenty-five issues (1961–1963) of their small magazine The Floating Bear. In October 1961, the U.S. Postal Service seized The Floating Bear #9; the FBI charged them for obscenity over William Burroughs' piece "Roosevelt after the Inauguration". In the autumn of 1961 he co-founded the New York Poets Theatre with di Prima, the choreographers Fred Herko and James Waring, and the actor Alan S. Marlowe. He had an extramarital affair with di Prima for several years; their daughter, Dominique di Prima, was born in June 1962.

Baraka visited Cuba in July 1960 with a Fair Play for Cuba Committee delegation and reported his impressions in his essay "Cuba Libre". There he encountered openly rebellious artists who declared him to be a "cowardly bourgeois individualist" more focused on building his reputation than trying to help those who were enduring oppression. This encounter led to a dramatic change in his writing and goals, causing him to become emphatic about supporting black nationalism.

In 1961 Baraka co-authored a "Declaration of Conscience" in support of Fidel Castro's regime. Baraka also was a member of the Umbra Poets Workshop of emerging Black Nationalist writers (Ishmael Reed and Lorenzo Thomas, among others) on the Lower East Side (1962–1965).

His first book of poems, Preface to a Twenty Volume Suicide Note, was published in 1961. Baraka's article "The Myth of a 'Negro Literature'" (1962) stated that "a Negro literature, to be a legitimate product of the Negro experience in America, must get at that experience in exactly the terms America has proposed for it in its most ruthless identity". He also stated in the same work that as an element of American culture, the Negro was entirely misunderstood by Americans. The reason for this misunderstanding and for the lack of black literature of merit was, according to Jones:

In most cases the Negroes who found themselves in a position to pursue some art, especially the art of literature, have been members of the Negro middle class, a group that has always gone out of its way to cultivate any mediocrity, as long as that mediocrity was guaranteed to prove to America, and recently to the world at large, that they were not really who they were, i.e., Negroes.

As long as black writers were obsessed with being an accepted middle class, Baraka wrote, they would never be able to speak their mind, and that would always lead to failure. Baraka felt that America only made room for white obfuscators, not black ones.

In 1963 Baraka (under the name LeRoi Jones) published Blues People: Negro Music in White America, his account of the development of black music from slavery to contemporary jazz. When the work was re-issued in 1999, Baraka wrote in the Introduction that he wished to show that "The music was the score, the actually expressed creative orchestration, reflection of Afro-American life ... That the music was explaining the history as the history was explaining the music. And that both were expressions of and reflections of the people." He argued that though the slaves had brought their musical traditions from Africa, the blues were an expression of what black people became in America: "The way I have come to think about it, blues could not exist if the African captives had not become American captives."

Baraka (under the name LeRoi Jones) wrote an acclaimed, controversial play titled Dutchman, in which a white woman accosts a black man on the New York City Subway. The play premiered in 1964 and received the Obie Award for Best American Play in the same year. A film of the play, directed by Anthony Harvey, was released in 1967. The play has been revived several times, including a 2013 production staged in the East Village.

After the assassination of Malcolm X in 1965, Baraka changed his name from LeRoi Jones to Amiri Baraka. At this time, he also left his wife and their two children and moved to Harlem, where he founded the Black Arts Repertory/Theater School (BARTS) since the Black Arts Movement created a new visual representation of art. However, the Black Arts Repertory Theater School remained open for less than a year. In its short time BARTS attracted many well-known artists, including Sonia Sanchez, Sun Ra and Albert Ayler. The Black Arts Repertory Theater School's closure prompted conversation with many other black artists who wanted to create similar institutions. Consequently, there was a surge in the establishment of these institutions in many places across the United States. In December 1965 Baraka moved back to Newark after allegations surfaced that he was using federal antipoverty welfare funds for his theater.

Baraka became a leading advocate and theorist for the burgeoning black art during this time. Now a "black cultural nationalist", he broke away from the predominantly white Beats and became critical of the pacifist and integrationist Civil Rights Movement. His revolutionary poetry became more controversial. A poem such as "Black Art" (1965), according to Werner Sollors of Harvard University, expressed Baraka's need to commit the violence required to "establish a Black World".

Baraka even uses onomatopoeia in "Black Art" to express that need for violence: "rrrrrrrrrrrrrrrrrrrrrrrrrrrrrrrrrrr ... tuhtuhtuhtuhtuhtuht ..." More specifically, lines in "Black Art" such as "Let there be no love poems written / until love can exist freely and cleanly", juxtaposed with "We want a black poem. / And a Black World", demonstrate Baraka's cry for political justice during a time when racial injustice was rampant, despite the civil rights movement.

"Black Art" quickly became the major poetic manifesto of the Black Arts Literary Movement, and in it, Jones declaimed, "we want poems that kill", which coincided with the rise of armed self-defense and slogans such as "Arm yourself or harm yourself" that promoted confrontation with the white power structure. Rather than use poetry as an escapist mechanism, Baraka saw poetry as a weapon of action.

In April 1965, Baraka's "A Poem for Black Hearts" was published as a direct response to Malcolm X's assassination, and it further exemplifies the poet's uses of poetry to generate anger and endorse rage against oppression. Like many of his poems, it showed no remorse in its use of raw emotion to convey its message. It was published in the September issue of Negro Digest and was one of the first responses to Malcolm's death to be exposed to the public. The poem is directed particularly at black men, and it scoldingly labels them "faggots" in order to challenge them to act and continue the fallen activist's fight against the white establishment.

Baraka also promoted theatre as a training for the "real revolution" yet to come, with the arts being a way to forecast the future as he saw it. In "The Revolutionary Theatre", Baraka wrote, "We will scream and cry, murder, run through the streets in agony, if it means some soul will be moved." In opposition to the peaceful protests inspired by Martin Luther King Jr., Baraka believed that a physical uprising must follow the literary one.

Baraka's decision to leave Greenwich Village in 1965 was an outgrowth of his response to the debate about the future of black liberation.

In 1966, Baraka married his second wife, Sylvia Robinson, who later adopted the name Amina Baraka. The two would open a facility in Newark known as Spirit House, a combination playhouse and artists' residence. In 1967, he lectured at San Francisco State University. The year after, he was arrested in Newark for having allegedly carried an illegal weapon and resisting arrest during the 1967 Newark riots. He was subsequently sentenced to three years in prison. His poem "Black People", published in the Evergreen Review in December 1967, was read by the judge in court, including the phrase: "All the stores will open if you say the magic words. The magic words are: "Up against the wall motherfucker this is a stick up!" Shortly afterward an appeals court reversed the sentence based on his defense by attorney Raymond A. Brown. He later joked that he was charged with holding "two revolvers and two poems".

Not long after the 1967 riots, Baraka generated controversy when he went on the radio with a Newark police captain and Anthony Imperiale, a politician and private business owner, and the three of them blamed the riots on "white-led, so-called radical groups" and "Communists and the Trotskyite persons". That same year his second book of jazz criticism, Black Music, came out. It was a collection of previously published music journalism, including the seminal Apple Cores columns from Down Beat magazine. Around this time he also formed a record label called Jihad, which produced and issued only three LPs, all released in 1968: Sonny's Time Now with Sunny Murray, Albert Ayler, Don Cherry, Lewis Worrell, Henry Grimes, and Baraka; A Black Mass, featuring Sun Ra; and Black & Beautiful – Soul & Madness by the Spirit House Movers, on which Baraka reads his poetry.

In 1967, Baraka (still LeRoi Jones) visited Maulana Karenga in Los Angeles and became an advocate of his philosophy of Kawaida, a multifaceted, categorized activist philosophy that produced the "Nguzo Saba", Kwanzaa, and an emphasis on African names. It was at this time that he adopted the name Imamu Amear Baraka. Imamu is a Swahili title for "spiritual leader", derived from the Arabic word Imam (إمام). According to Shaw, he dropped the honorific Imamu and eventually changed Amear (which means "Prince") to Amiri. Baraka means "blessing, in the sense of divine favor".

In 1970 he supported Kenneth A. Gibson's candidacy for mayor of Newark; Gibson was elected as the city's first African-American mayor.

In the late 1960s and early 1970s, Baraka courted controversy by penning some strongly anti-Jewish poems and articles. Historian Melani McAlister points to an example of this writing: "In the case of Baraka, and in many of the pronouncements of the NOI [Nation of Islam], there is a profound difference, both qualitative and quantitative, in the ways that white ethnicities were targeted. For example, in one well-known poem, Black Arts [originally published in The Liberator January 1966], Baraka made offhand remarks about several groups, commenting in the violent rhetoric that was often typical of him, that ideal poems would 'knockoff ... dope selling wops' and suggesting that cops should be killed and have their 'tongues pulled out and sent to Ireland.' But as Baraka himself later admitted [in his piece I was an AntiSemite published by The Village Voice on December 20, 1980, vol. 1], he held a specific animosity for Jews, as was apparent in the different intensity and viciousness of his call in the same poem for 'dagger poems' to stab the 'slimy bellies of the ownerjews' and for poems that crack 'steel knuckles in a jewlady's mouth.'"

Prior to this time, Baraka prided himself on being a forceful advocate of Black cultural nationalism; however, by the mid-1970s, he began finding its racial individuality confining. Baraka's separation from the Black Arts Movement began because he saw certain Black writers – capitulationists, as he called them – countering the Black Arts Movement that he created. He believed that the groundbreakers in the Black Arts Movement were doing something that was new, needed, useful, and Black, and those who did not want to see a promotion of black expression were "appointed" to the scene to damage the movement.

In 1974, Baraka distanced himself from Black nationalism, embracing Marxism–Leninism in the context of Maoist third-world liberation movements.

In 1979, he became a lecturer in the State University of New York at Stony Brook's Africana Studies Department in the College of Arts and Sciences at the behest of faculty member Leslie Owens. Articles about Baraka appeared in the university's print media from Stony Brook Press, Blackworld, and other student campus publications. These articles included a page-one exposé of his positions in the inaugural issue of Stony Brook Press on October 25, 1979, discussing his protests "against what he perceived as racism in the Africana Studies Department, as evidenced by a dearth of tenured professors". Shortly thereafter, Baraka took a tenure-track assistant professorship at Stony Brook in 1980 to assist "the struggling Africana Studies Department"; in 1983, he was promoted to associate professor and earned tenure.

In June 1979 Baraka was arrested and jailed at Eighth Street and Fifth Avenue in Manhattan. Different accounts emerged around the arrest, yet all sides agreed that Baraka and his wife, Amina, were in their car arguing over the cost of their children's shoes. The police version of events holds that they were called to the scene after a report of an assault in progress. They maintain that Baraka was hitting his wife, and when they moved to intervene, he attacked them as well, whereupon they used the necessary force to subdue him. Amina's account contrasted with that of the police; she held a news conference the day after the arrest accusing the police of lying. A grand jury dismissed the assault charge, but the resisting arrest charge moved forward. In November 1979 after a seven-day trial, a criminal court jury found Baraka guilty of resisting arrest. A month later he was sentenced to 90 days at Rikers Island (the maximum he could have been sentenced to was one year). Amina declared that her husband was "a political prisoner". Baraka was released after a day in custody pending his appeal. At the time it was noted that if he was kept in prison, "he would be unable to attend a reception at the White House in honor of American poets." Baraka's appeal continued up to the State Supreme Court. During the process, his lawyer, William M. Kunstler, told the press that Baraka "feels it's the responsibility of the writers of America to support him across the board". Backing for his attempts to have the sentence canceled or reduced came from "letters of support from elected officials, artists and teachers around the country". Amina Baraka continued to advocate for her husband and at one press conference stated, "Fascism is coming and soon the secret police will shoot our children down in the streets." In December 1981 Judge Benrard Fried ruled against Baraka and ordered him to report to Rikers Island to serve his sentence on weekends occurring between January 9, 1982, and November 6, 1982. The judge noted that having Baraka serve his 90 days on weekends would allow him to continue his teaching obligations at Stony Brook. Rather than serve his sentence at the prison, Baraka was allowed to serve his 48 consecutive weekends in a Harlem halfway house. While serving his sentence he wrote The Autobiography, tracing his life from birth to his conversion to socialism.

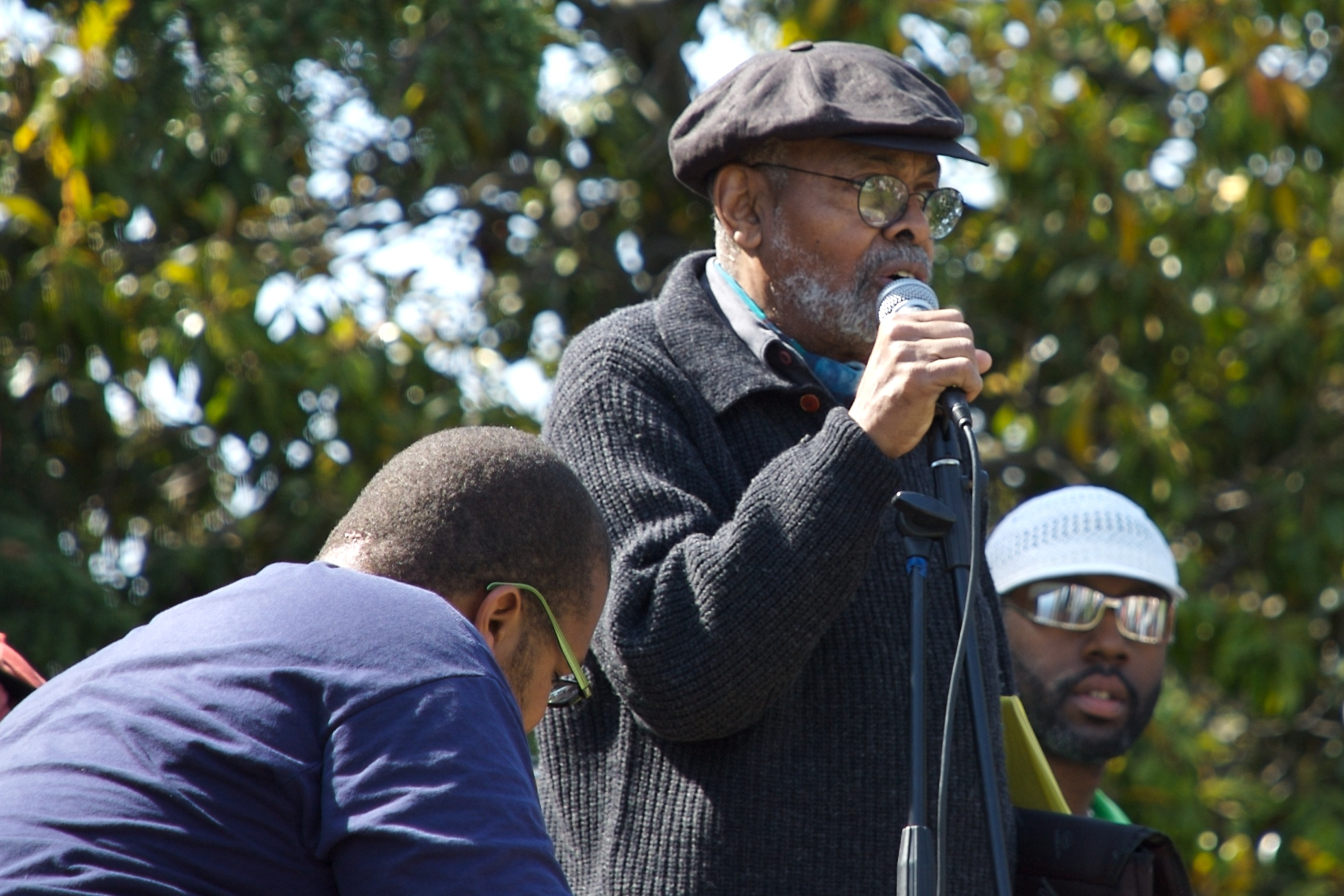
Baraka addressing the Malcolm X Festival from the Black Dot Stage in San Antonio Park, Oakland, California, while performing with Marcel Diallo and his Electric Church Band

During the 1982–83 academic year, Baraka returned to Columbia University as a visiting professor, teaching a course entitled "Black Women and Their Fictions". After becoming a full professor of African Studies at Stony Brook in 1985, Baraka took an indefinite visiting appointment in Rutgers University's English department in 1988; over the next two years, he taught a number of courses in African American literature and music. Although Baraka sought a permanent, tenured appointment at the rank of full professor in early 1990 (in part due to the proximity between the university's campus in New Brunswick, New Jersey and his home in Newark), he did not attain the requisite two-thirds majority of the senior faculty in a contentious 9–8 vote that favored his appointment. Baraka would go on to collectively liken the committee to an "Ivy League Goebbels" while also characterizing the senior faculty as "powerful Klansmen", leading to a condemnation from department chair Barry Qualls. Thereafter, Baraka was nominally affiliated with Stony Brook as professor emeritus of Africana Studies until his death. In 1987, together with Maya Angelou and Toni Morrison, he was a speaker at the commemoration ceremony for James Baldwin.

In 1989 Baraka won an American Book Award for his works as well as a Langston Hughes Award. In 1990 he co-authored the autobiography of Quincy Jones, and in 1998 he appeared in a supporting role in Warren Beatty's film Bulworth. In 1996, Baraka contributed to the AIDS benefit album Offbeat: A Red Hot Soundtrip produced by the Red Hot Organization.

In July 2002, Baraka was named Poet Laureate of New Jersey by Governor Jim McGreevey. The position was to be for two years and came with a $10,000 stipend. Baraka held the post for a year, during which time he was mired in controversy, including substantial political pressure and public outrage demanding his resignation. During the Geraldine R. Dodge Poetry Festival in Stanhope, New Jersey, Baraka read his 2001 poem on the September 11th attacks "Somebody Blew Up America?", which was criticized for antisemitism and attacks on public figures. Because there was no mechanism in the law to remove Baraka from the post, and he refused to step down, the position of state poet laureate was officially abolished by the State Legislature and Governor McGreevey. In October 2002, 131 creatives and activists signed the surrealist-sponsored declaration "Poetry Matters: On the Media Persecution of Amiri Baraka" in solidarity with him. Signatories included Mary Stanley Low.

In 2002, scholar Molefi Kete Asante included Baraka on his list of 100 Greatest African Americans. Baraka collaborated with hip-hop group The Roots on the song "Something in the Way of Things (In Town)" on their 2002 album Phrenology.

In 2003, Baraka's daughter Shani, aged 31, and her lesbian partner, Rayshon Homes, were murdered in the home of Shani's sister, Wanda Wilson Pasha, by Pasha's ex-husband, James Coleman. Prosecutors argued that Coleman shot Shani because she had helped her sister separate from her husband. A New Jersey jury found Coleman (also known as Ibn El-Amin Pasha) guilty of murdering Shani Baraka and Rayshon Holmes, and he was sentenced to 168 years in prison for the 2003 shooting.

His son, Ras J. Baraka (born 1970), is a politician and activist in Newark, who served as principal of Newark's Central High School, as an elected member of the Municipal Council of Newark (2002–06, 2010–present) representing the South Ward. Ras J. Baraka became Mayor of Newark on July 1, 2014. (See 2014 Newark mayoral election.)

== Death ==
Amiri Baraka died on January 9, 2014, at Beth Israel Medical Center in Newark, New Jersey, after being hospitalized in the facility's intensive care unit for one month before his death. The cause of death was not reported initially, but it is mentioned that Baraka had a long struggle with diabetes. Later reports indicated that he died from complications after a recent surgery. Baraka's funeral was held at Newark Symphony Hall on January 18, 2014.

== Controversies ==
Baraka's work has been criticized for being racist, homophobic, antisemitic and misogynist among others.

=== Anti-white sentiment ===
Baraka and his writings emanated extreme and hostile anti-white sentiment. He viewed blacks as morally superior than whites, whom he believed were innately evil.

In his 1984 autobiography, he wrote:

A woman asked me in all earnestness, couldn't any whites help? I said, you can help by dying. You are a cancer. You can help the world's people with your death.

The following is from a 1965 essay:

Most American white men are trained to be fags. For this reason it is no wonder their faces are weak and blank ... The average ofay [white person] thinks of the black man as potentially raping every white lady in sight. Which is true, in the sense that the black man should want to rob the white man of everything he has. But for most whites the guilt of the robbery is the guilt of rape. That is, they know in their deepest hearts that they should be robbed, and the white woman understands that only in the rape sequence is she likely to get cleanly, viciously popped.

In 2009, he was again asked about the quote, and placed it in a personal and political perspective:

Those quotes are from the essays in Home, a book written almost fifty years ago. The anger was part of the mindset created by, first, the assassination of John Kennedy, followed by the assassination of Patrice Lumumba, followed by the assassination of Malcolm X amidst the lynching, and national oppression. A few years later, the assassination of Martin Luther King and Robert Kennedy. What changed my mind was that I became a Marxist, after recognizing classes within the Black community and the class struggle even after we had worked and struggled to elect the first Black Mayor of Newark, Kenneth Gibson.

=== Misogyny and advocacy of rape ===
Baraka advocated for the rape of white women by Black men, believing that it was a politically legitimate act. Baraka objectified white women, believing that they served as a location of racial struggle rather than as human beings. He implied that white women would enjoy being raped by black men, experiencing the rape as "sexually exhilarating—a God-like gift that no white man could give to her". If she did not, and she instead perceived her rape by a black man as a "beast-like violation", then she was racist. Author bell hooks commented on Baraka's misogyny in her book Ain't I a Woman?:

Ironically, the "power" of black men that Baraka and others celebrated was the stereotypical, racist image of the black man as primitive, strong, and virile. Although these same images of black men had been evoked by racist whites to support the argument that all black men are rapists, they were now being romanticized as positive characteristics.

=== Homophobia ===
Baraka frequently denounced homosexuality in his writing. He employed homophobic slurs in his writings (e.g. faggot), usually against white men, but also against black men he disagreed with. Some critics have alleged Baraka's homophobia to be suppressed homosexual desire.

=== Antisemitism ===
In the 1967 poem "The Black Man is Making New Gods", Baraka accused Jews of having stolen knowledge of Africa, transporting it to Europe, where they became white and claimed it as their own. He wrote of Jesus as a "fag" and as "the dead jew" who, Baraka argues, was a Jewish scam on Christians. Baraka embraces Nazi genocidal depictions of Jews, who embody a "dangerous germ culture".

His 1972 essay collection Raise, Race, Rays, Raze refers to people as "jew-slick", "jeworiented revolutionaries", and also "cohen edited negro history".

In 1980 Baraka published an essay in the Village Voice that was titled Confessions of a Former Anti-Semite. Baraka insisted that a Village Voice editor titled it and not himself. In the essay, Baraka went over his life history, including his marriage to Hettie Cohen, who was Jewish. He stated that after the assassination of Malcolm X, he found himself thinking: "As a Black man married to a white woman, I began to feel estranged from her ... How could someone be married to the enemy?" He eventually divorced Hettie and left her with their two bi-racial daughters. In the essay, Baraka went on to say

We also know that much of the vaunted Jewish support of Black civil rights organizations was in order to use them. Jews, finally, are white, and suffer from the same kind of white chauvinism that separates a great many whites from the Black struggle. ... these Jewish intellectuals have been able to pass over into the Promised Land of American privilege.

In the essay, he also defended his position against Israel, saying: "Zionism is a form of racism." Near the end of the essay, Baraka stated the following:

Anti-Semitism is as ugly an idea and as deadly as white racism and Zionism ...As for my personal trek through the wasteland of anti-Semitism, it was momentary and never completely real. ... I have written only one poem that has definite aspects of anti-Semitism...and I have repudiated it as thoroughly as I can.

The poem Baraka referenced was "For Tom Postell, Dead Black Poet", which contained lines including:

...Smile jew. Dance, jew. Tell me you love me, jew. I got something for you ... I got the extermination blues, jewboys. I got the hitler syndrome figured ... So come for the rent, jewboys ... one day, jewboys, we all, even my wig wearing mother gonna put it on you all at once.

==== September 11 attacks ====
In July 2002, ten months after the September 11 attacks on the World Trade Center, Baraka wrote a poem entitled "Somebody Blew Up America?" that was accused of antisemitism and met with harsh criticism. The poem is highly critical of racism in America, and includes humorous depictions of public figures such as Trent Lott, Clarence Thomas, and Condoleezza Rice. It also contains lines claiming Israel's knowledge of the World Trade Center attacks:

Who know why Five Israelis was filming the explosion
And cracking they sides at the notion
...
Who knew the World Trade Center was gonna get bombed
Who told 4000 Israeli workers at the Twin Towers
To stay home that day
Why did Sharon stay away?

Baraka said that he believed Israelis and President George W. Bush had advance knowledge of the September 11 attacks, citing what he described as information that had been reported in the American and Israeli press and on Jordanian television. Baraka himself denied that the poem is antisemitic, due to the use of word "Israeli" rather than "Jew".

However, antisemitism watchdog organizations such as the Anti-Defamation League (ADL) denounced the poem as antisemitic. The ADL noted that the "4000 workers" conspiracy theory had initially referred to Jews in general and claimed that Baraka was using an antisemitic tactic of replacing references to Jews at large with references to Israel and then claiming a comment is merely anti-Zionist.

After the poem's publication, Governor Jim McGreevey tried to remove Baraka from the post of Poet Laureate of New Jersey, to which he had been appointed in July 2002. McGreevey learned that there was no legal way, according to the law authorizing and defining the position, to remove Baraka. On October 17, 2002, legislation to abolish the post was introduced in the State Senate and subsequently signed by McGreevey, becoming effective July 2, 2003. The poet laureate post ceased to exist when the law became effective. In response to legal action filed by Baraka, the United States Court of Appeals for the Third Circuit ruled that state officials were immune from such suits, and in November 2007 the Supreme Court of the United States refused to hear an appeal of the case.

Journalist Richard M. Cohen in The Washington Post denounced Baraka's "anti-Semitic bleat" and stated: "Baraka is a bigger idiot than he is a dangerous anti-Semite."

== Honors and awards ==
Baraka served as the second Poet Laureate of New Jersey from July 2002 until the position was abolished on July 2, 2003. In response to the attempts to remove Baraka as the state's Poet Laureate, a nine-member advisory board named him the poet laureate of the Newark Public Schools in December 2002.

Baraka received honors from a number of prestigious foundations, including the following: fellowships from the Guggenheim Foundation and the National Endowment for the Arts, the Langston Hughes Award from the City College of New York, the Rockefeller Foundation Award for Drama, an induction into the American Academy of Arts and Letters, and the Before Columbus Foundation Lifetime Achievement Award.

A short excerpt from Amiri Baraka's poetry was selected to be used for a permanent installation by artist Larry Kirkland in New York City's Pennsylvania Station.

I have seen many suns
use
the endless succession of hours
piled upon each other

Carved in marble, this installation features excerpts from the works of several New Jersey poets (from Walt Whitman, William Carlos Williams, to contemporary poets Robert Pinsky and Renée Ashley) and was part of the renovation and reconstruction of the New Jersey Transit section of the station completed in 2002.

== Legacy and influence ==
Despite numerous controversies and polarizing content of his work, Baraka's literary influence is undeniable. His co-founding of the Black Arts Movement in the 1960s promoted a uniquely black nationalist perspective and influenced an entire literary generation. Critic Naila Keleta-Mae argues that Baraka's legacy is one of "saying the unsayable", a course that likely damaged his own literary reputation and canonization. For example, Baraka was left out of the 2013 anthology Angles of Ascent, a collection of contemporary African-American poetry published by Norton. In a review of the anthology, Baraka criticized editor Charles H. Rowell's hostility towards the Black Arts Movement, calling Rowell's "attempt to analyze and even compartmentalize" contemporary African-American poetry as "flawed". Indeed, Rowell's introduction to Angles of Ascent references the "fetters of narrow political and social demands that have nothing to do with the production of artistic texts", evincing a political/apolitical dichotomy where the editor considers overly political works of lesser artistic value. Critic Emily Ruth Rutter recognizes the contribution to African American literary studies of Angles of Ascent yet also proposes adding Baraka and others to ensure students do not "unknowingly accept" the notion that Baraka and writers like him were somehow absent from influencing twenty-first century poetry.

In Rain Taxi, Richard Oyama criticized Baraka's militant aesthetic, writing that Baraka's "career came to represent a cautionary tale of the worst 'tendencies' of the 1960s—the alienating rejections, the fanatical self-righteousness, the impulse toward separatism and Stalinist repression versus multi-racial/class coalition-building. ... In the end, Baraka's work suffered because he preferred ideology over art, forgetting the latter outlasts us all."

Baraka's participation in a diverse array of artistic genres combined with his own social activism allowed him to have a wide range of influence. When discussing his influence in an interview with NPR, Baraka stressed that he had influenced numerous people. When asked what he would write for his own epitaph, he quipped, "We don't know if he ever died", evincing the personal importance of his own legacy to him. NPR's obituary for Baraka describes the depths of his influence simply: "...throughout his life – the Black Arts Movement never stopped". Baraka's influence also extends to the publishing world, where some writers credit him with opening doors to white publishing houses which African American writers previously had been unable to access.

For the 60th anniversary of Baraka's Blues People, trumpeter and composer Russell Gunn premiered a suite, The Blues and Its People, inspired by it at the Apollo.

== Works ==
=== Poetry ===
- 1961: Preface to a Twenty Volume Suicide Note
- 1964: The Dead Lecturer: Poems
- 1969: Black Magic
- 1970: It's Nation Time
- 1980: New Music, New Poetry (India Navigation)
- 1995: Transbluesency: The Selected Poems of Amiri Baraka/LeRoi Jones
- 1995: Wise, Why's Y's
- 1996: Funk Lore: New Poems
- 2003: Somebody Blew Up America & Other Poems
- 2005: The Book of Monk

=== Drama ===
- 1964: Dutchman
- 1964: The Slave
- 1967: The Baptism and The Toilet
- 1966: A Black Mass
- 1968: Home on the Range and Police
- 1969: Four Black Revolutionary Plays
- 1970: Jello
- 1970: Slave Ship
- 1978: The Motion of History and Other Plays
- 1979: The Sidney Poet Heroical, (published by I. Reed Books, 1979)
- 1989: Song
- 2013: Most Dangerous Man in America (W. E. B. Du Bois)

=== Fiction ===
- 1965: The System of Dante's Hell
- 1967: Tales
- 2004: Un Poco Low Coup, (graphic novel published by Ishmael Reed Publishing)
- 2006: Tales of the Out & the Gone

=== Non-fiction ===
- 1963: Blues People
- 1965: Home: Social Essays
- 1965: The Revolutionary Theatre
- 1968: Black Music
- 1971: Raise Race Rays Raze: Essays Since 1965
- 1972: Kawaida Studies: The New Nationalism
- 1979: Poetry for the Advanced
- 1980: "Confessions of a former Anti-Semite." The Village Voice, December 17, 1980
- 1981: reggae or not!
- 1984: Daggers and Javelins: Essays 1974–1979
- 1984: The Autobiography of LeRoi Jones/Amiri Baraka
- 1987: The Music: Reflections on Jazz and Blues
- 2003: The Essence of Reparations

=== Edited works ===
- 1968: Black Fire: An Anthology of Afro-American Writing (co-editor, with Larry Neal)
- 1969: Four Black Revolutionary Plays
- 1983: Confirmation: An Anthology of African American Women (edited with Amina Baraka)
- 1999: The LeRoi Jones/Amiri Baraka Reader
- 2000: The Fiction of LeRoi Jones/Amiri Baraka
- 2008: Billy Harper: Blueprints of Jazz, Volume 2 (Audio CD)

=== Filmography ===
- The New Ark (1968)
- One P.M. (1972)
- Fried Shoes Cooked Diamonds (1978) ... Himself
- Black Theatre: The Making of a Movement (1978) ... Himself
- Poetry in Motion (1982)
- Furious Flower: A Video Anthology of African American Poetry 1960–95, Volume II: Warriors (1998) ... Himself
- Through Many Dangers: The Story of Gospel Music (1996)
- Bulworth (1998) ... Rastaman
- Piñero (2001) ... Himself
- Strange Fruit (2002) ... Himself
- Ralph Ellison: An American Journey (2002) ... Himself
- Chisholm '72: Unbought & Unbossed (2004) ... Himself
- Keeping Time: The Life, Music & Photography of Milt Hinton (2004) ... Himself
- Hubert Selby Jr: It/ll Be Better Tomorrow (2005) ... Himself
- 500 Years Later (2005) (voice) ... Himself
- The Ballad of Greenwich Village (2005) ... Himself
- The Pact (2006) ... Himself
- Retour à Gorée (2007) ... Himself
- Polis Is This: Charles Olson and the Persistence of Place (2007)
- Revolution '67 (2007) ... Himself
- Turn Me On (2007) (TV) ... Himself
- Oscene (2007) ... Himself
- Corso: The Last Beat (2008)
- The Black Candle (2008)
- Ferlinghetti: A City Light (2008) ... Himself
- W.A.R. Stories: Walter Anthony Rodney (2009) ... Himself
- Motherland (2010)

=== Discography ===
- It's Nation Time (Black Forum/Motown, 1972)
- New Music - New Poetry (India Navigation, 1982) with David Murray and Steve McCall
- Real Song (Enja, 1995)

With Billy Harper

- Blueprints of Jazz Vol. 2 (Talking House Records, 2008)

With the New York Art Quartet

- New York Art Quartet (ESP-Disk, 1965)

With Malachi Thompson

- Freebop Now! (Delmark, 1998)

with David Murray

- Fo Deuk Revue (Justin Time, 1997), "Evidence"

with William Parker

- I Plan to Stay a Believer (AUM Fidelity, 2010)
