= The Goldberg Variation (The X-Files) =

- The X-Files episode
- Mulder and Scully examine Henry Weems's Rube Goldberg machine, the inspiration for the episode's title.
- Episode no.: Season 7 Episode 6
- Directed by: Thomas J. Wright
- Written by: Jeffrey Bell
- Production code: 7ABX02
- Original air date: 12 December 1999
- Running time: 44 minutes

Guest appearances
- Willie Garson as Henry Weems; Ramy Zada as Jimmy Cutrona; Alyson Reed as Maggie Lupone; Shia LaBeouf as Richie Lupone; Tony Longo as Dominic; Ernie Lee Banks as Maurice; Chip Fogleman as Billy; Marshall Manesh as Mr. Jank; Dom Magwili as Mr. Ng; Nicholas Worth as Mr. Haas; Dominique di Prima as Megan McLean

Episode chronology
← Previous "Rush"	Next → "Orison"
- The X-Files season 7

"The Goldberg Variation" is the sixth episode of the seventh season of the science fiction television series The X-Files. It premiered on the Fox network in the United States on 12 December 1999. It was written by Jeffrey Bell, directed by Thomas J. Wright, and featured guest appearances by Willie Garson and Shia LaBeouf. The episode is a "Monster-of-the-Week" story, unconnected to the series' wider mythology. "The Goldberg Variation" earned a Nielsen household rating of 8.8, being watched by 14.49 million people in its initial broadcast. The episode received mixed-to-positive reviews.

The show centers on FBI special agents Fox Mulder (David Duchovny) and Dana Scully (Gillian Anderson) who work on cases linked to the paranormal, called X-Files. Mulder is a believer in the paranormal, while the skeptical Scully has been assigned to debunk his work. In this episode, Mulder and Scully investigate a mysterious man named Henry Weems, who appears to be the luckiest man in the world. The title is a dual reference to Rube Goldberg machines and the Goldberg Variations by Johann Sebastian Bach.

Bell's original draft of the episode opened with a man falling thirty-thousand feet from an airplane and walking away unharmed. Due to budgetary reasons, the intro was later changed to a man falling out of a building. Willie Garson—who had appeared in the third season episode "The Walk"—was cast as Henry Weems. The first cut of the episode was four minutes under-time, and so various insert shots and new scenes had to be filmed in order to compensate.

== Plot ==
In Chicago, a man by the name of Henry Weems wins $100,000 playing poker against a mobster named Jimmy Cutrona, though Weems appears ignorant of the basic rules of poker. Suspecting that Weems cheated, Cutrona attempts to kill him by throwing him off the 29th story of the building. After Weems lands in a laundry cart in the basement, he stands up and walks away. Fox Mulder (David Duchovny) initially believes the man has the ability to cure himself, but Dana Scully (Gillian Anderson) thinks he may just be very lucky.

The agents track down Weems, a handyman at an apartment building. He refuses to testify against Cutrona. Weems has a fascination with Rube Goldberg machines and his apartment is filled with them. As the agents leave, one of Cutrona's enforcers arrives to kill Weems, but dies in an improbable cascade of events. The two agents rush back up stairs and find Weems unscathed. Mulder notes that Weems was the sole survivor of a commuter jet crash that killed 20 people in December 1989.

Weems buys a lottery ticket and wins $100,000, but throws the ticket away when he learns that it would take 12 months to get the money. A man retrieves the ticket and after ignoring Weems's warning that "something bad will happen," is hit by a truck. Later, as Mulder questions Weems again, another one of Cutrona's enforcers tries to kill him, only for his bullet to ricochet off Weems's pocket knife, barely graze Mulder's arm, and hit and wound the enforcer. Weems confesses that he has been trying to find a way to get $100,000 to pay for an expensive medical treatment for a boy in his apartment building named Richie (Shia LaBeouf). Later, after Weems is hit by a car, it appears that his lucky streak has reached its end. Cutrona kidnaps Richie's mom, Maggie (Alyson Reed), to stop Weems from testifying against him. Weems turns himself in to Cutrona so he would let Maggie go; instead, they plan to kill him. As they are about to execute Weems in the basement, Cutrona and his mobster partner, Dominic, are killed in a bizarre turn of events, whereas Weems and Maggie are unharmed as Mulder arrives with backup. In the end, it turns out that Cutrona is an organ donor and a perfect match for Richie, who gets his medical treatment and lives.

== Production ==
=== Writing ===
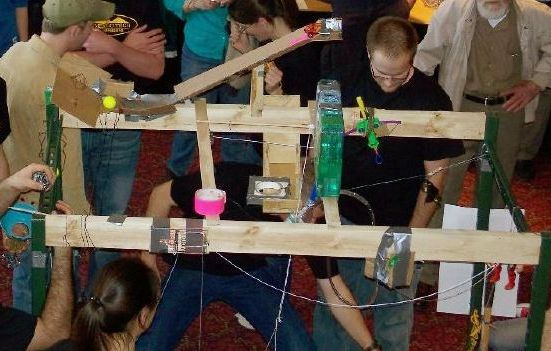
"The Goldberg Variation" was inspired by various Rube Goldberg machines.

Episode writer Jeffrey Bell wanted the episode to function "as a Rube Goldberg device," so he wrote a story to revolve around the ideas of good and bad luck. Originally, the episode's opening scene was to have featured Weems falling out of an airplane but surviving uninjured. After Bell's pitch, many of the show's writers and producers were cautious about the script, because they realized the episode would be somewhat humorous. Executive producer Frank Spotnitz explained: "The episode had a lot of humorous moments that we were afraid of doing because as many people who like the funny ones hate the funny ones." Eventually, the episode was green-lit, but pushed a few episodes after the premiere because "we wanted to scare the hell out of everybody during the first few episodes," according to Spotnitz.

When Bell began crafting his script, he realized that the biggest hurdle for the episode would be crafting the Rube Goldberg machine. However, because Bell had "extra time" to write his script, the art department was also given more time to work on the contraptions. Gillian Anderson later explained that while the machines were enjoyable, working with them "required a lot of patience," as multiple takes were often required to make sure that they operated as intended. Rick Millikan, the show's casting director, broke a "long-standing rule" on the show and re-cast Willie Garson—who had appeared in the third season episode "The Walk"—as Henry Weems. Millikan noted that Garson was "literally the best person for the job."

The episode's title is a pun. It refers to both cartoonist Rube Goldberg, who was famous for his drawings of incredibly complex machines made out of everyday objects that performed rudimentary tasks, as well as the harpsichord piece "The Goldberg Variations" by Johann Sebastian Bach. The elaborate contraptions Henry Weems created are physical examples of the former machines.

=== Post-production ===
After filming for the episode was finished, the footage entered into a long period of editing. Series creator Chris Carter noted that prior to re-editing, the episode "wasn't cutting together well and that there were things that just didn't work." Once the footage was worked into an acceptable episode, it was four minutes under time. In order to compensate for this, additional inserts of the Rube Goldberg Machine were filmed as well as a scene featuring Mulder and Scully discussing the episode's back-story. The latter of these scenes, which was filmed months after the majority of the episode, required Anderson to wear a wig because her hair style had substantially changed.

When the episode was finally finished and aired, it was highly enjoyed by The X-Files cast and crew. Carter called the entry "tight, funny, touching, and quirky." Series writer Vince Gilligan was impressed with the episode, and noted that the episode was epitomic of the seventh season of the show as whole. He explained: "The seventh season, for my money, was one of our best because we took more storytelling risks than in previous years."

== Broadcast and reception ==
"The Goldberg Variation" first aired in the United States on 12 December 1999. This episode earned a Nielsen rating of 8.8, with a 13 share, meaning that roughly 8.8 percent of all television-equipped households, and 13 percent of households watching television, were tuned in to the episode. It was viewed by 14.49 million viewers. The episode aired in the United Kingdom and Ireland on Sky1 on 23 April 2000 and received 0.78 million viewers, making it the fifth most watched episode that week.

The episode received mixed-to-positive reviews. Tom Kessenich, in his book Examinations, gave the episode a largely positive review. He favorably compared the episode to the sixth season episode "The Rain King" and noted that "'The Rain King' [written by Jeff Bell] was quite simply one of the joys of season six. So it hardly came as a surprise to me that I enjoyed Bell's 'The Goldberg Variation" entry for [season seven]. It was cute, light-hearted, and a little kooky, with a happy ending to boot." Den of Geek writer Juliette Harrisson named the episode the "finest stand-alone episode" of Season Seven and wrote, "Since 'The X-Files' roots are in horror, feel-good episodes are few and far between, and something to be treasured when they appear. The Goldberg Variation is the perfect feel-good X-Files episode; not too soppy, not too harsh, but just the right mix of ludicrous gangster deaths and saving the cute kid." Paula Vitaris from Cinefantastique gave the episode a moderately positive review and awarded it three stars out of four. She called the episode a "charmer" and praised Willie Garson's characterization of Harry Weems. Kenneth Silber from Space.com wrote positively of the episode, writing, "'The Goldberg Variation' is a clever, witty standout from the recent middling run of X-Files episodes." Emily VanDerWerff of The A.V. Club awarded the episode a "B+" and called it a "fun" entry that shows off the series' "emotional palette". She felt that the episode successfully managed to convey a "clever and whimsical" feel, but that the conceit of a "good man" as the monster of the episode does not make it particularly scary. All-in-all, she felt that it "all works out in the end".

Other reviews were more mixed. Rich Rosell from Digitally Obsessed awarded the episode 3.5 out of 5 stars and noted that despite the episode being "Funny stuff," it was ultimately "a little uneven overall." Robert Shearman, in his book Wanting to Believe: A Critical Guide to The X-Files, Millennium & The Lone Gunmen, rated the episode three stars out of five. Despite calling the episode "a likeable piece of work", the author explained that the story itself was fine, but that the episode's set piece did not work with the plot. Shearman, however, ultimately concluded that the premise was "such a well-meaning little bauble that you want to applaud it for its intent if nothing else."

== Bibliography ==
- Hurwitz, Matt; Knowles, Chris (2008). The Complete X-Files. Insight Editions. ISBN 978-1-933784-80-9.
- Kessenich, Tom (2002). Examination: An Unauthorized Look at Seasons 6–9 of the X-Files. Trafford Publishing. ISBN 1-55369-812-6.
- Koven, Mikel J. (2010), "The X-Files", in Lavery, David (ed.), The Essential Cult TV Reader, Lexington: University Press of Kentucky, ISBN 978-0-8131-2568-8
- Shapiro, Marc (2000). All Things: The Official Guide to the X-Files Volume 6. Harper Prism. ISBN 0-06-107611-2.
- Shearman, Robert (2009). Wanting to Believe: A Critical Guide to The X-Files, Millennium & The Lone Gunmen. Mad Norwegian Press. ISBN 978-0-9759446-9-1.
