= Marcel Diallo =

American musician, poet and writer

- Born: October 9, 1972 (age 53); California, United States
- Occupations: Poet; Musician; Artist; Philosopher; Social Entrepreneur; Activist
- Instruments: Vocals; MPC60II
- Years active: 1997-present
- Website: Official Site

Marcel Diallo is an American musician, poet, artist and community builder, known for his founding of the Black Dot Artists Collective (later Black Dot Artists, Inc.), The Black New World and his revitalization efforts in West Oakland's historic, predominantly African-American Prescott neighborhood aka the Lower Bottoms.

== Biography ==
Diallo was born and raised in California, the eldest of four children, in a poor neighborhood. After graduating from California Polytechnic State University, San Luis Obispo with a B.A. in philosophy, Diallo moved back to the Bay Area, settling in Oakland while earning a master's degree at John F. Kennedy University in Consciousness Studies. In Oakland he became involved in Oakland's café poetry scene. He opened a poetry venue, The Black Dot Cafe in 1998.

== Career ==
Diallo began as an open mic poet/emcee. He founded the Black Dot Artists' Collective in 1996 with poet Robert Jamal Jackson and percussionist Kele Nitoto. The three artists began an open mic called "Rhyme Ritual" at The Java House in Oakland that attracted artists involved in the Bay Area's spoken word and poetry scene.

In 1997, Diallo released his first album, The Shaman and The Nigga God, on Akashic Records, a Bay Area independent hip-hop label.

In 1998, Marcel Diallo opened the Ritual Space and Black Dot Cafe in East Oakland. Some well-known artists featured were Boots Riley from The Coup, Eddie Gale, Amiri Baraka, The Last Poets, Kahil El Zabar, Marvin X, The Grouch and Bicasso from Living Legends, and Piri Thomas. The space also featured an open mic night called The Word and a youth workshop called Beats, Flows & Videos. Esoterism was a strong theme at both venues where yoga, meditation, vegan lifestyle workshops and other spiritual services were offered alongside traditional hip-hop concerts.

When Black Dot artists collective got evicted from their East Oakland location, they relocated to West Oakland. Though the artists collective had previously done arts-activism work such as the "No on Prop 21" campaign, it would become concentrated in one neighborhood with their new location in 2000. Coined the Village Bottoms by Diallo, the artists collective focused on community and economic development, as well as affordable housing and anti-gentrification education in West Oakland. The area, which currently involves mostly Pine and Wood streets is being revitalized by a community of active volunteers into a Black cultural district, similar to that of Leimert Park in Los Angeles and Lincoln Park Coast Cultural District in Newark, New Jersey. The area, which has been a multi-ethnic community, but remained primarily African-American after World War II, saw its economic infrastructure change drastically upon the building of the BART station, Cypress Freeway, and the post office. Over the years, the area grew one of the worst reputations in Oakland as the Lower Bottoms. Project of Diallo's organization the Village Bottoms Community Building and Development Corporation, have been an urban farm, cultural arts businesses, performance venues, cooperative/collective grocery services, affordable housing, and public arts parades and programs.

In 2000, Diallo was selected to exhibit a visual arts installation titled, Scrapyard Ghosts, at ProArts Gallery in Old Oakland. He has since opened various galleries in Oakland's Prescott neighborhood. He exhibited and taught at the California College of the Arts in San Francisco in 2006. Diallo has curated at places like Yerba Buena Center for the Arts and created art for exhibits at Bay Area galleries. His curatorial exhibits have featured some of the Bay Area's renown artists such as former Black Panther Emory Douglas, West Oakland sculptor Bruce Beasley, Eesuu Orundide, Keba Konte, Githinji Wa Mbire, Kevin Slagle, Don Fortescue and others. He has also worked with artists Amiri Baraka, The Last Poets, David Murray, Kahil El Zabar, Sonia Sanchez, Kamau Da'oud, Marvin X, Piri Thomas, Micheal McClure, Lawrence Ferlinghetti, Guillermo Gómez-Peña, and Don Cheadle.

In 2000, Diallo was featured in Source Magazine's Dreaming Americans series.

He is also co-founder of Eastside Arts Alliance, a multicultural organization in the Lower San Antonio District and currently works with Ecocity Builders. The concept of a cultural district has been labelled by some residents as exclusionary. Diallo and his non-black supporters have been quoted in the mainstream media stating that the revitalization of Oakland's oldest Black neighborhood is for the benefit of all residents of Oakland, regardless of race, color or creed. He was quoted in the San Francisco Chronicle Sunday Magazine in January 2007 saying, " It's not just for blacks... Everybody needs a black cultural district. Just like everybody needs a Chinatown."

In 2009, Diallo was featured prominently on CNN's "Reclaiming The Dream" because of his legendary efforts in helping to revitalize West Oakland's historic predominantly African-American "Lower Bottoms" neighborhood. In the piece Diallo is quoted as saying that while he understands that gentrification is happening, and that West Oakland is moving towards being "one of the most integrated neighborhoods in the Bay Area", that he just wants to make sure that the longtime black working-class inhabitants are able to participate in the neighborhood's newfound wealth.

The CNN coverage shared Diallo's vision of a Black Cultural District with millions of viewers internationally, causing hundreds of people across the country to visit the District. Diallo answered the cause, by giving frequent tours of the District to people of all backgrounds on a weekly basis.

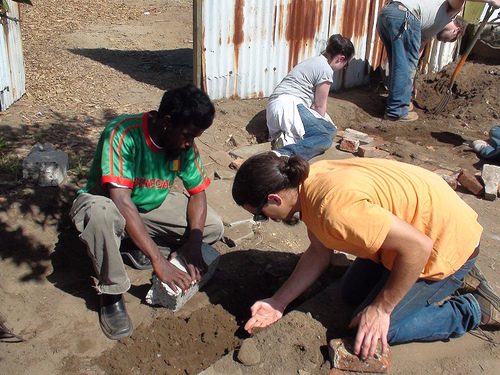
Diallo working alongside others in the Village Bottoms.

== Continuing creative efforts ==
He has self-published one book of poetry. His forthcoming book Black New World Manifesto, featuring prose and poems with a foreword by Amiri Baraka was due for release by Black Dot Cafe Press in 2009.

== Discography ==
Album/EPs

The Shaman & The Nigga God (1997)

SPACE: Rhyme Ritual Trio (1998)

Live @ The CyberCafe (1998)

Shadows & Moonlight (1998)

Overdue Babies (2003)

Honey Suga Love (2009)

== Bibliography ==
"The Shaman & Chapter Book", 1997

The Last Will And Testament of Shitworker Jainkins: Prosessays & Bastard Literature, 1998

== Exhibitions ==
West Oakland Today/Scrapyard Ghosts, ProArts Gallery, 1998 (artist)

Reparations!, Asian Resource Gallery, Oakland Chinatown, 1999 (artist)

Sampling Oakland/ Eastside Story, YBCA, 2006 (guest curator & artist)

OSHUN, Cornelia Bell's Black Bottom Gallery, Oakland, 2007 (artist)

Decolonization! An installation of Self-Rule, Cornelia Bell's Black Bottoms Gallery, Oakland, 2007 (curator & artist)

Betcha Bottom Dollar: An Underground Currency Game, Cornelia Bell's Black Bottom Gallery, Oakland, 2007 (curator & artist)

Black Panther: The Cultural Ministry of Emory Douglas, ART@THE CANNERY, Oakland, 2008 (curator & artist)

West Oakland at The Moment, ART@THE CANNERY, Oakland, 2008 (curator & artist)

Ekpu & The Fattening House: The Art of Inyang Ntofon, ART@THE CANNERY (curator)

BAN5/ The Black New World Recipe Book One: Sanctified Gumbo, Yerba Buena Center for The Arts, 2008 (guest curator & artist)
