= The System of Dante's Hell =

Book by Amiri Baraka

- First edition
- Author: LeRoi Jones
- Language: English
- Published: 1965
- Publisher: Grove Press

The System of Dante's Hell is a short novel by African-American writer LeRoi Jones, published in 1965 by Grove Press. The novel follows a young black man living nomadically in big cities and small towns in the Southern United States, and his struggles with segregation and racism. The book correlates the man's experience with Dante's Inferno, and includes a diagram of the fictional hell described by Dante Alighieri.
