= Donna Berwick =

American costume designer (1958–2024)

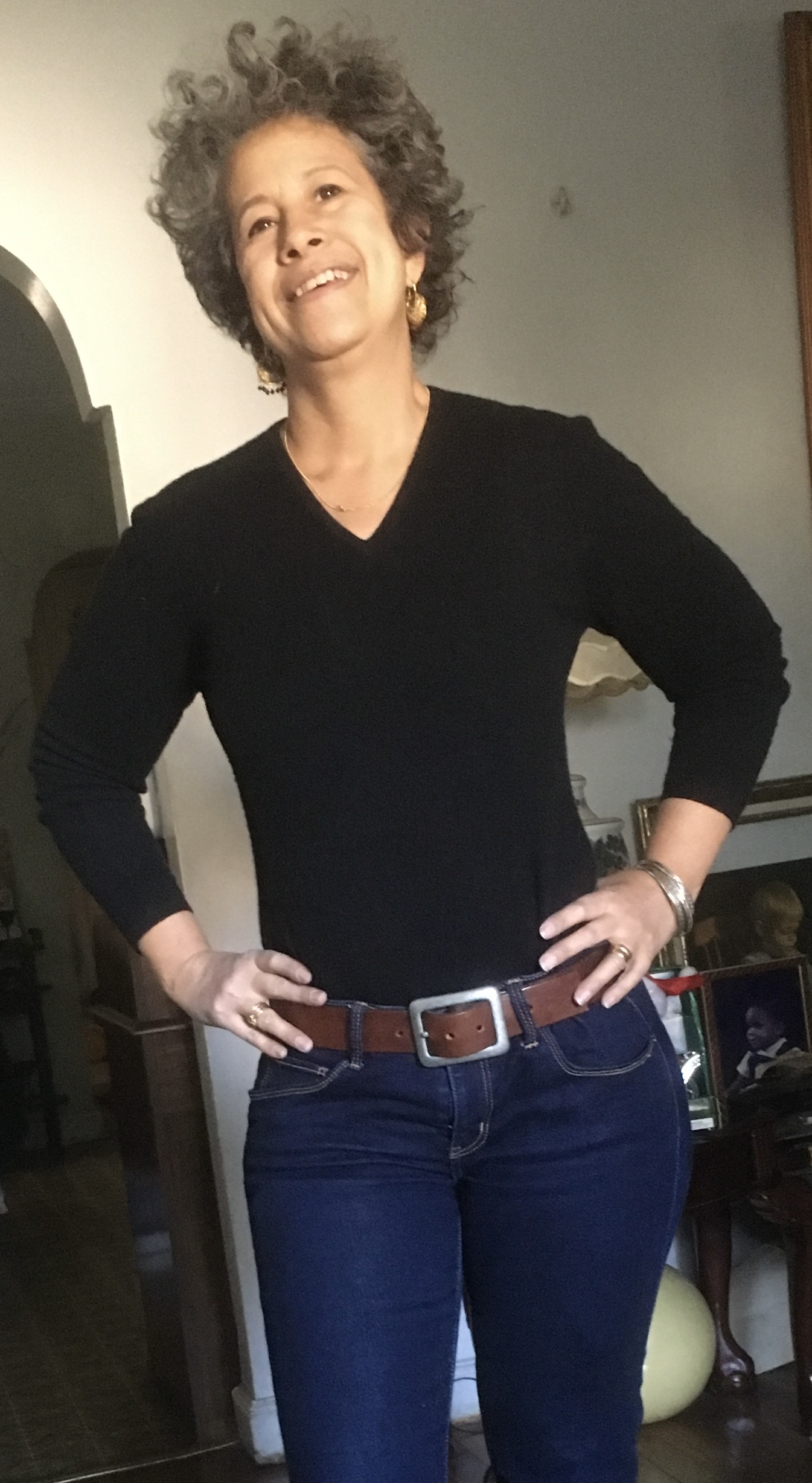
- Donna Berwick in 2017
- Born: October 30, 1958; Queens, New York, U.S.
- Died: July 14, 2024 (aged 65)
- Occupations: Costume designer, fashion designer

Donna M. Berwick (October 30, 1958 – July 14, 2024) was an American costume designer, best known for her work on films by Spike Lee and Ernest Dickerson.

== Early life and education ==
Berwick was born in Queens, New York, the daughter of Norman and Hermine Berwick. She had two brothers. She earned degrees from the School of Visual Arts and the Fashion Institute of Technology, both in New York City.

== Career ==
Berwick began her career as a fashion designer in New York city, and was a member of Rodeo Caldonia, a Black feminist arts and performance collective based in Brooklyn. She worked in costuming on Spike Lee films including Mo' Better Blues (1990) and Malcolm X (1992) with designer Ruth E. Carter. She also assisted designer April Ferry on costumes for U571 (2000), Donnie Darko (2001), and Game of Thrones. She assisted Caroline Eselin on costume designs for If Beale Street Could Talk (2018).

Berwick was nominated for a Costume Designers Guild award in 2021, for her work on Da 5 Bloods (2020), and was mentioned in Variety as an Oscar contender for this film.

== Filmography ==
On the following films and television series, Berwick was credited as Costume Designer. She was assistant or associate costume designer on many other projects.

- Ezra (2023, Tony Goldwyn, dir.)
- Da 5 Bloods (2020, Spike Lee, dir.)
- Hemlock Grove (2013, television series)
- You're Nobody 'till Somebody Kills You (2012)
- Life Support (2007, television movie)
- Inside Man (2006)
- Miracle's Boys (2004, television series)
- She Hate Me (2004, Spike Lee, dir.)
- Crazy as Hell (2002, Eriq La Salle, dir.)
- Clover (1997, television movie)
- First Time Felon (1997, television movie)
- Subway Stories (1997, television movie)
- ABC Afterschool Specials (2 television episodes, 1993 and 1996)
- Surviving the Game (1994, Ernest Dickerson, dir.)
- Daybreak (1993, television movie, Stephen Tolkin, dir.)
- Juice (1992, Ernest Dickerson, dir.)

== Personal life ==
Berwick died from breast cancer in 2024, at the age of 66.
