= Alva Rogers =

African-American visual artist and performer (born 1959)

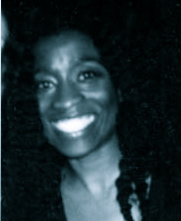
- Born: 1959 (age 66–67); New York City, New York, U.S.
- Occupations: Writer; Performer; Actress
- Notable work: Daughters of the Dust; School Daze ''The Doll Plays''; Band of Susans
- Awards: 2026 Guggenheim Fellowship

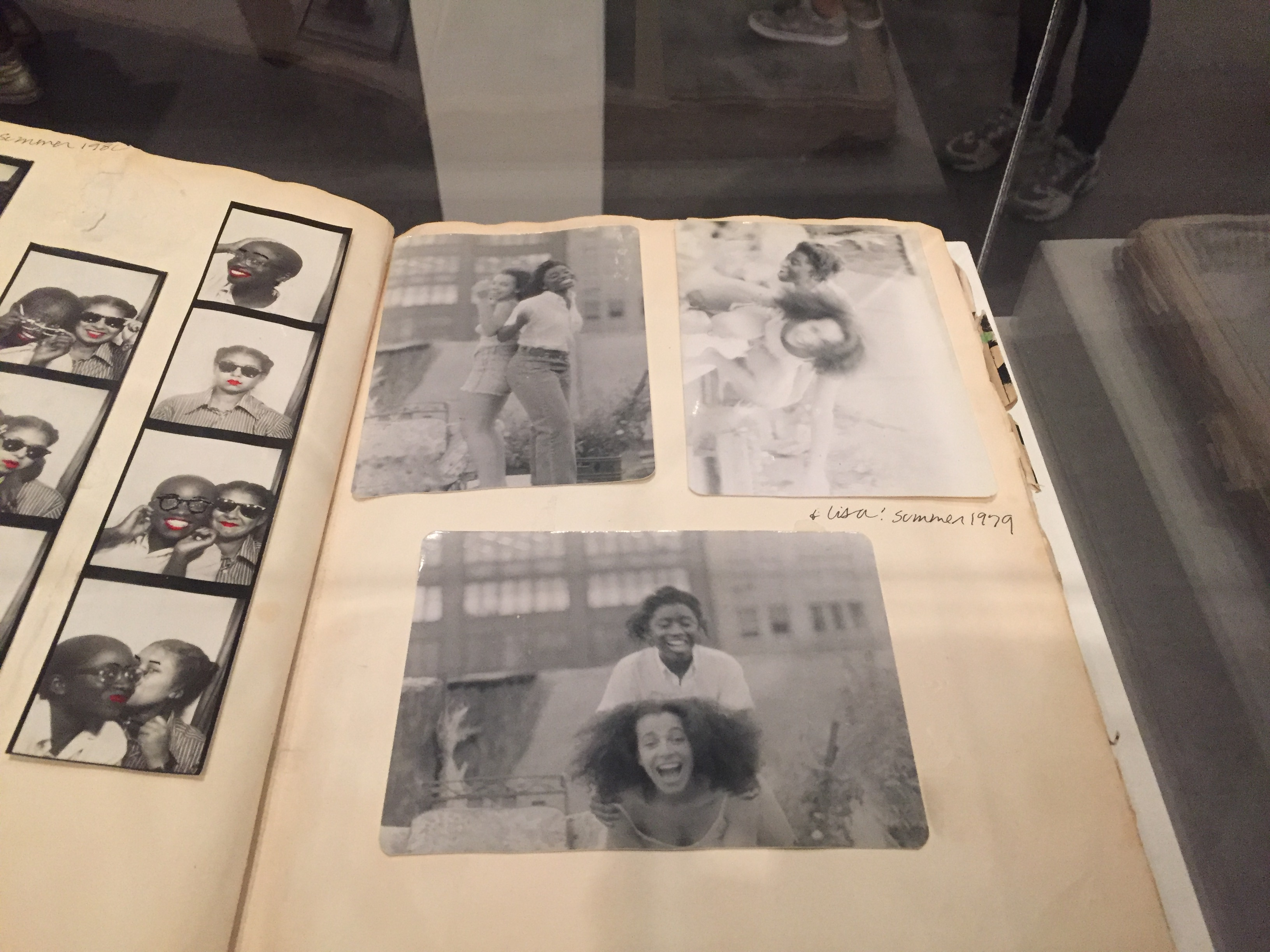
Alva Rogers Journal, from Black Radical Women at the Brooklyn Museum

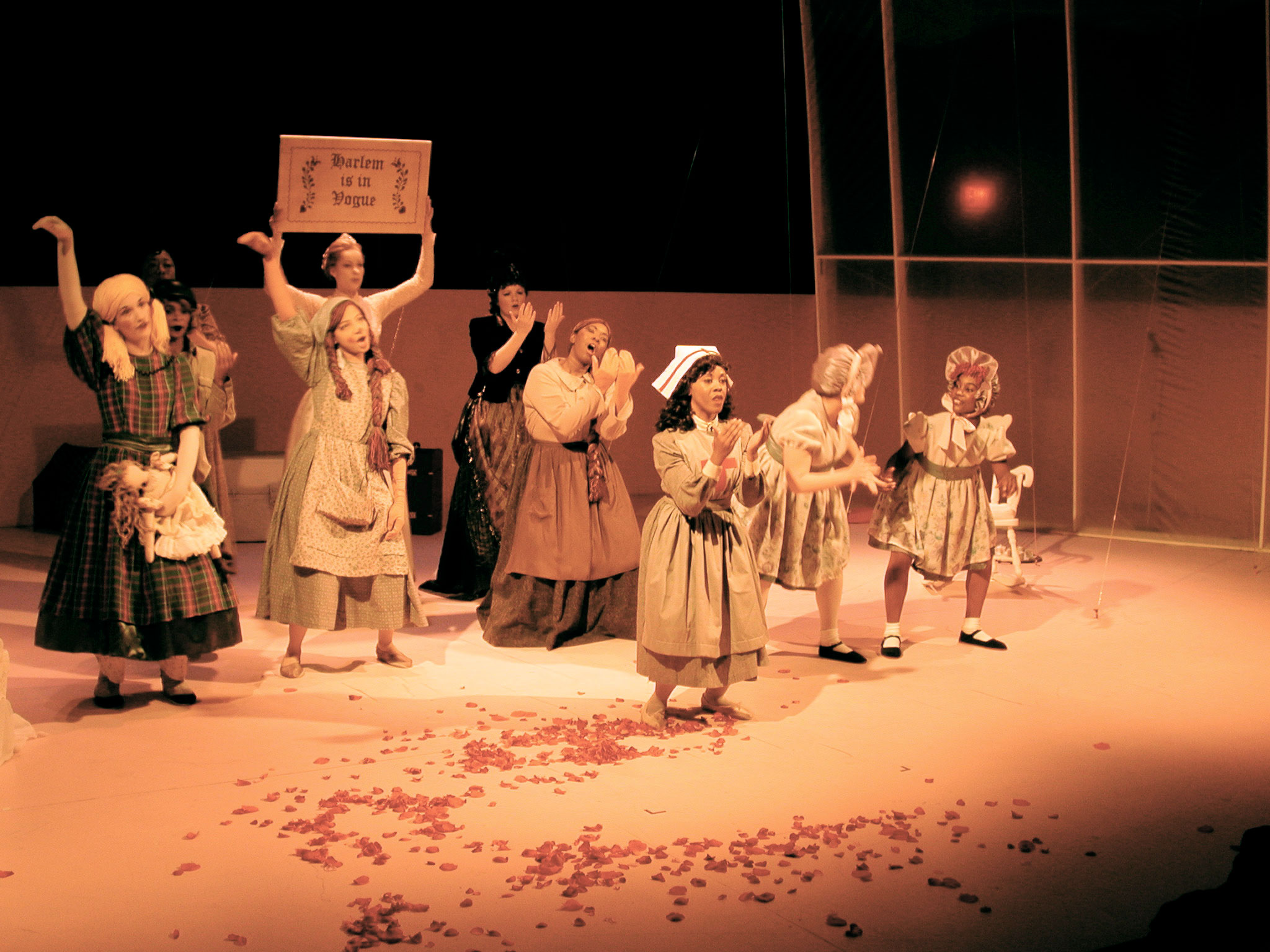
Alva Rogers, The Doll Plays

Alva Rogers (born 1959) is an American playwright, composer, actor, vocalist, and arts educator. She is known for the use of dolls and puppetry in interdisciplinary work. Rogers performed in the role of Eula Peazant in Julie Dash's 1991 film Daughters of the Dust. and was a vocalist in the New York City alternative rock band Band of Susans.

== Early life ==
Rogers was born and raised in New York City, where she graduated with a concentration in vocal music from The High School of Music & Art. She has a bachelor's degree in American history from Marietta College. In 1995, she received a Master of Fine Arts in musical theater writing from Tisch School of the Arts at New York University. In 1998, she received a Master of Fine Arts in literary arts from Brown University, and in 2013, she received a Master of Arts in teaching with a focus on history from Bard College.

== Personal life ==
Rogers lives and works in Manhattan.

== Career ==
=== Art ===
==== Rodeo Caldonia ====
Rogers has been a part of numerous notable artist collaborations. From 1985 to 1989, she was a founding member of Rodeo Caldonia, a black women's art collective formed in the Brooklyn neighborhood of Fort Greene that included fellow artists Lorna Simpson, Chakaia Booker and Sandye Wilson among others. With Lisa Jones, also a member of Rodeo Caldonia, she wrote a series of radio plays--Aunt Aida's Hand (1989), Stained (1991), and Ethnic Cleansing (1993)--for New American Radio on National Public Radio. In 2015 Greg Tate facilitated a panel discussion with Rogers and Lisa Jones about Rodeo Caldonia in the 2011 film Brooklyn Boheme.

Alva Rogers and her work with Rodeo Caldonia was included in the 2017 Brooklyn Museum exhibition We Wanted a Revolution: Black Radical Women, 1965–1985 curated by Rujeko Hockley and Catherine Morris.

During Robert Colescott's 1989 exhibition at the New Museum Rogers was featured in Black to the Future: Alva Rogers in Performance, a public program that unpacked the issues in Colescott's work. The program was curated by Kellie Jones.

==== Puppetry ====
With puppeteer Heather Henson and the composer Bruce Monroe, she created three musicals: nightbathing, mermaid, and Sunday (performed Off-Off-Broadway as part of the New Works Now! series at the Public Theater. Rogers also created audio recordings for Whitfield Lovell's work Whispers from the Walls.

==== Other work ====
In the late 1980s, Rogers was a vocalist with the New York City based alternative rock group Band of Susans. She performed on their debut EP Blessing and Curse (1987), and their first full-length album Hope Against Hope (1988).

Rogers appeared on the cover of Essence Magazine's beauty issue in January 1993. She has been photographed by photographer Lyle Ashton Harris and Dawoud Bey.

She was a writer in residence at Hedgebrook Women Playwright retreat on Whidbey Island, Washington in 2011 that culminated in a reading of her work at ACT Theater.

=== Acting ===
==== School Daze ====
In 1988, Rogers played Doris Witherspoon in Spike Lee's film School Daze about intra-racial prejudice in HBCU academia. It was an early film for most of the actors and most of the stars and crew were African American. The film co-starred Laurence Fishburne, Giancarlo Esposito, Tisha Campbell, Ossie Davis and Kadeem Hardison amongst others.

==== Daughters of the Dust ====
In 1991, Rogers appeared in Julie Dash's film Daughters of the Dust. The film took place in 1902 about a matriarchal family during the Great Migration. Eula, Rogers' character, is raped by a white man and the fear of lynching gives her family no recourse to investigate her pregnancy. The film has been noted to have influenced Beyonce's 2016 album Lemonade.

"Daughters was a major aesthetic leap forward for black cinema in that it did not mimic Hollywood storytelling but drew on European art house films, African traditions and created its own idiosyncratic style," said Nelson George, filmmaker.

The cinematographer for Daughters of the Dust was Arthur Jafa.

==== Other films ====
Rogers appeared as herself in the film Brooklyn Boheme (2011), which documented the New Black Arts Movement in Fort Greene in the 1980s and 1990s. She is featured in Kerry James Marshall's film The Doppler Incident (1997) and was a frequent subject in the photographs of Lorna Simpson.

== Filmography ==
- 1988: School Daze – as Doris Witherspoon
- 1991: Daughters of the Dust – as Eula Peazant
- 1994: Fresh Kill – as Cello player in locker
- 2005: The Flooded Playground (Video short) – as The Singing Tree
- 2010: Window on Your Present – as Girl On Shoulders
- 2011: Spirits of Rebellion: Black Film at UCLA (Documentary) – as Eula Peazant
- 2012: Brooklyn Boheme (Documentary) – as herself

== Publications ==
Rogers's works as a playwright include The Bride Who Became Frightened When She Saw Life Open, The Doll Plays, and Scooping the Darkness Empty.

== Awards ==
Rogers has won grants from the Guggenheim Fellowship, Jim Henson Foundation, National Endowment for the Arts, a New York Foundation for the Arts Fellowship in Playwriting in 2004, and the Rockefeller Foundation.
