= Blues People =

1963 book by Amiri Baraka

- Front cover of the first edition
- Author: Amiri Baraka
- Language: English
- Subject: Blues, musicians
- Genre: Non-fiction
- Published: 1963
- Publisher: William Morrow
- Publication place: United States
- Pages: 244 pp.
- ISBN: 9780688184742
- OCLC: 973412280

Blues People: Negro Music in White America is a non-fiction book focusing on the Afro-American music, published in 1963 by Amiri Baraka, who published it under the pen name LeRoi Jones.

In Blues People Baraka explores the history of Black Americans through the evolution of Black music and documents the effects of jazz and blues on American culture, at musical, economic, and social levels. Blues People argues that "negro music"—as Amiri Baraka calls it—appealed to and influenced new America. The book chronicles many genres of music dating from African music carried to America by Black people during the Atlantic slave trade, up to the 1960s. According to Baraka, music and melody is not the only way the gap between American culture and African-American culture was bridged. Music also helped spread values and customs through its media exposure. Blues People demonstrates the influence of African Americans and their culture on American culture and history. The book examines blues music as performance, as cultural expression, even in the face of its commodification. The book chronicles what brought him to believe that blues was a personal history of his people in the United States.

== Content ==
To Baraka, Blues People represented "everything [he] had carried for years, what [he] had to say, and [himself]". Baraka dedicates the book "to my parents ... the first Negroes I ever met".

The 1999 reprint begins with a reminiscence by the author, then aged 65, titled "Blues People: Looking Both Ways", in which he credits the poet and English teacher Sterling Brown with having inspired both him and his contemporary A. B. Spellman. Baraka does not here discuss the impact his book has had.

== Chapters ==
The original text is divided into twelve chapters, summarized below.

=== "The Negro as Non-American: Some Backgrounds" ===
Baraka opens the book by arguing that Africans suffered in America not only because they were slaves, but because American customs were foreign to them. He argues that slavery itself was not unnatural or alien to the African people, as slavery had long before existed in the tribes of West Africa. Some forms of West African slavery even resembled the plantation system in America. He then discusses a brief history of slavery, inside and outside the United States. He argues that unlike the slaves of Babylon, Israel, Assyria, Rome, and Greece, American slaves were not even considered human.

Baraka then further addresses his previous assertion that African slaves suffered in the New World because of the alien environment around them. For example, the language and dialect of colonial English had no resemblance to the African dialects. However, the biggest difference that set the African people aside was the difference in skin color. Even if the African slaves were freed, they would always remain apart and be seen as ex-slaves rather than as freed individuals. Colonial America was an alien land in which the African people could not assimilate because of the difference in culture and because they were seen as less than human.

The horrors of slavery can be broken down into the different ways in which violence was done against African people. In this section Baraka contends that one of the reasons the Negro people had, and continue to have, a sorrowful experience in America is the violently different ideologies held by them and their captors. He transitions from highlighting the economic intentions of Western religion and war to pointing out how the very opposite life views of the West African can be construed as primitive because of the high contrast. He addresses the violence done against the cultural attitudes of Africans brought to this country to be enslaved. He references the rationale used by Western society to justify its position of intellectual supremacy. Western ideologies are often formed around a heightened concept of self; it is based on a belief that the ultimate happiness of mankind is the sole purpose of the universe. These beliefs are in direct opposition to those of the Africans originally brought to this country, for whom the purpose of life was to appease the gods and live out a predetermined fate.

Baraka stresses a point made by Melville Herskovits, the anthropologist responsible for establishing African and African-American studies in academia, which suggests that value is relative or that "reference determines value". Although Baraka is not justifying the white supremacist views of the West, he does create a space to better understand the belief that one can be more evolved than a people from whom one differs very much. Likewise the author does not present the African system of belief in supernatural predetermination as better but speaks of how an awful violence is done against these people ideologically, by forcing them into a world that believes itself to be the sole judge of the ways in which proper existence must occur.

=== "The Negro as Property" ===
In chapter 2, "The Negro as Property", Baraka focuses on the journey from the African to the African American. He breaks down the process of the African's acculturation to show its complex form. Baraka begins with the initial introduction to life in America. He compares the African's immigrant experience to that of the Italian and Irish. He says the Italian and Irish came "from their first ghetto existences into the promise and respectability of this brave New World" (p. 12). Africans, on the other hand, came to this new world against their will. There was no promise or respectability in America for them, only force and abrupt change, and this defines the evolution of African-American culture.

After emancipation in 1863, the former slaves are being included in society. Baraka explains, these former slaves are no longer Africans. They are people of African descent who have, for generations, adapted to American culture. Their arrival and assimilation are most importantly not by choice. After being forcefully brought to America, the following generations are raised in a system that obliterates any trace of African culture. Children are immediately separated from their slave mothers at birth. They only learn stories and songs about Africa but lack the experience. Baraka states, "the only way of life these children knew was the accursed thing they had been born into" (p. 13). He shows that slavery is the most influential factor in African-American culture. He goes on to include the living conditions of slavery as an additional force. He refers to Herskovits's ideas to explain the dilution of African culture in the United States specifically. In the Caribbean and the rest of the Americas there are much heavier traces of African culture in the slave population. Herskovits explains this as a result of the master to slave ratio in these areas. In the United States the master to slave ratio was much smaller than in other regions of the New World, and is reflected in its form of a slave culture with constant association between the master and slave.

Baraka continues with a description of the effects of the "constant association" between African slaves and the culture of their white masters. This, he states, was a phenomenon confined to the United States. Whereas in the Caribbean and South America the majority of white slave owners had households wealthy enough to keep teams of hundreds of slaves, the American South maintained a class of "poor whites" who owned smaller groups of forced workers. In these smaller estates slaves would often be subjected to sexual abuse at the hand of their masters, as well as social cohabitation among small children (however black and white children would not attend the same schools.) Baraka asserts that a result of this "intimacy" was the alienation of African slaves from the roots of their culture—tribal references (as well as the "intricate political, social, and economic systems of the West Africans"—including trades such as wood carving and basket weaving) faded in the wake of American culture—relegated to the status as "artifact". He argues that only religious, magical, and artistic African practices (that do not result in "artifacts") survived the cultural whitewashing, standing as the "most apparent legacies" of the roots of African families made slaves.

=== "African Slaves / American Slaves: Their Music" ===
Jazz is recognized as beginning around the turn of the 20th century, but is actually much older. Most people believe that its existence derived from African slavery, but it has native African-American roots. Blues music gave birth to Jazz, and both genres of music stem from the work songs of the first generation of African slaves in America.

As slave owners forbade their slaves to chant and sing their ritualistic music, in fear of a rebellion, the original African slaves were forced to change their work songs in the field. The lyrics of their songs changed as well, as the original African work songs did not suit their oppressed situation. Jones states that the first generation of these slaves, the native Africans, truly knew the struggle of being forced into submission and stripped of their religion, freedoms, and culture. The music that formed as a result became a combination of the original African work songs and references to slave culture. Negroes in the New World transformed their language to be a mix of their own language and their European masters', which included Negro-English, Negro-Spanish, Negro-French, and Negro-Portuguese, all of which can be observed in their songs.

Storytelling was the primary means of education within the slave community, and folk tales were a popular and useful means of passing down wisdom, virtues, and so on from the elders to the youth. These folk tales also became integrated into their music and American culture, and later began to appear in the lyrics of blues songs.

Expression of oneself, emotions, and beliefs was the purpose of the African work song. Instruments, dancing, culture, religion, and emotion were blended together to form this representative form of music. Adaptation, interpretation, and improvisation lay at the core of this American Negro music. The nature of slavery dictated the way African culture could be adapted and evolved. For example, drums were forbidden by many slave owners, for fear of its communicative ability to rally the spirits of the enslaved, and lead to aggression or rebellion. As a result, slaves used other percussive objects to create similar beats and tones.

As the music derived from their slave/field culture, shouts and hollers were incorporated into their work songs, and were later represented through an instrumental imitation of blues and jazz music. Based on this, Jones declares that "the only so-called popular music in this country of any real value is of African derivation."

=== "Afro-Christian Music and Religion" ===
Christianity was adopted by the Negro people before the efforts of missionaries and evangelists. The North American Negroes were not even allowed to practice or talk about their own religion that their parents taught them. Specifically, in the south, slaves were sometimes beaten or killed when they talked about conjuring up spirits or the devil. Negroes also held a high reverence to the gods of their conquerors. Since their masters ruled over their everyday lives, Negroes acknowledge that the conqueror's gods must be more powerful than the gods they were taught to worship through discreet traditions. Christianity was also attractive to the Negroes, because it was a point of commonality between the white and black men. Negroes were able to finally imitate something valuable from their white slave owners. By accepting Christianity, Negro men and women had to put away a lot of their everyday superstitious traditions and beliefs in lucky charms, roots, herbs, and symbolism in dreams. Bakari felt white captors or slave masters exposed Christianity to the slaves because they saw Christianity as justification for slavery. Christianity gave the slaves a philosophical resolution of freedom. Instead of wishing to go back to Africa, slaves were looking forward to their appointed peaceful paradise when they meet their savior. Although they had to endure the harshness of slavery, the joy of living a peaceful life forever in eternity meant a lot more for them. As a result of accepting Christianity, slave masters were also happy that their slaves were now bound to live by a high moral code of living in order that they might reach the promised land. A lot of the early Christian Negro church services greatly emphasized music. Call-and-response songs were typically found in African services. Through singing of praise and worships songs in church, Negroes were able to express pent up emotions. African church elders also banished certain songs they considered "secular" or "devil songs" (p. 48). They also banished the playing of violins and banjos. Churches also began sponsoring community activities such as barbecues, picnics, and concerts, which allowed the Negro people to interact with each other. As time went by, African churches were able to produce more liturgical leaders such as apostles, ushers, and deacons. After the slaves were emancipated, the church community that was built by Negro leaders began to disintegrate because many began to enjoy the freedom outside of the church. As a result, some began listening again to the "devil's music" that was banned in the church and secular music became more prevalent.

=== "Slave and Post-Slave" ===
The chapter "Slave and Post-Slave" mainly addresses Baraka's analysis of the cultural changes Negro Americans had to face through their liberation as slaves, and how the blues developed and transformed through this process. After years of being defined as property, the Negro had no place in the post-slave white society. They had to find their place both physically, as they looked for somewhere to settle, but also psychologically, as they reconstructed their self-identity and social structure. Their freedom gave them a new sense of autonomy, but also took away the structured order of life to which they were accustomed. Baraka believes the Civil War and the Emancipation served to create a separate meta-society among Negroes, separating the Negroes more effectively from their masters with the institution of Jim Crow laws and other social repressions. The Reconstruction period brought about liberty for the American Negro and an austere separation from the white ex-slave owners and the white society that surrounded them. Organizations such as the KKK, Pale Faces, and Men of Justice emerged, seeking to frighten Negroes into abandoning their newfound rights, and to some extent succeeding. The Negro leaders — or educated, professional or elite Negro Americas such as Booker T. Washington— and many of the laws that were made to separate races at the time, divided blacks into different groups. There were those who accepted the decree of "separate but equal" as the best way for the Negro to live peacefully in the white order, and those who were separate from white society. After the initial period following the Emancipation, songs that arose from the conditions of slavery created the idea of blues, including the sounds of "shouts, hollers, yells, spirituals, and ballits", mixed with the appropriation and deconstruction of white musical elements. These musical traditions were carried along the post-slavery Negro culture, but it had to adapt to their new structure and way of life, forming the blues that we recognize today.

=== "Primitive Blues and Primitive Jazz" ===
The chapter "Primitive Blues and Primitive Jazz" refers to Baraka's breakdown of the development of blues — and jazz as an instrumental diversion — as Negro music through the slave and especially post-slave eras, into the music that we would consider blues today (its standardized and popular form). After Emancipation Negroes had the leisure of being alone and thinking for themselves; however, the situation of self-reliance proposed social and cultural problems that they never encountered as slaves. Both instances were reflected in their music, as the subject music became more personal and touched on issues of wealth and hostility. The change among speech patterns, which began to resemble Americanized English, also created a development in blues as words had to be announced correctly and soundly. With Negro singers no longer being tied to the field, they had an opportunity to interact with more instruments; primitive or country blues was influenced by instruments, especially the guitar. Jazz occurs from the appropriation of this instrument and their divergent use by blacks, with elements like "riffs", which gave it a unique Negro or blues sound. In New Orleans blues was influenced by European musical elements, especially brass instruments and marching band music. Accordingly, the uptown Negroes, differentiated from the "Creoles" — blacks with French ancestry and culture, usually of a higher class — gave a more primitive, "jass" or "dirty" sound to this appropriated music; which gave blues and jazz a distinct sound. Creoles had to adapt to this sound once segregation placed them on the same level as all other freed black slaves. The fact that the Negro could never become white was a strength, providing a boundary between him and the white culture; creating music that was referenced by African, sub-cultural, and hermetic resources.

=== "Classic Blues" ===
Baraka starts the chapter with marking it as the period where classic blues and ragtime proliferated. The change from Baraka's idea of traditional blues to classic blues represented a new professional entertainment stage for African-American art. Prior to classical blues, traditional blues' functionality required no explicit rules, and therefore a method didn't exist. Classic blues added a structure that was not there before. It started becoming popular with the change in minstrel shows and circuses. Minstrel shows demonstrated recognition of the "Negro" as part of American popular culture, which though it always had been, was never formally recognized. It was now more formal. Minstrel shows, despite the overall slanderous nature towards African Americans, were able to aid in the creation of this new form. It included more instruments, vocals and dancing than the previous blues tradition. Blues artist like Bessie Smith in "Put it Right Here or Keep It Out There" were presenting an unspoken story to Americans who have not heard of or had ignored it. He makes the distinction between blues, which he ties to slavery, and ragtime, which he claims to have more European musical ties. Baraka notes that this more classic blues created more instrumental opportunities for African Americans, but on the other hand instruments such as the piano were the last to incorporate and had a much more free spirited melody than the other instruments or compared to ragtime. Even with these new sounds and structure, some classic blues icons remained out of the popular music scene.

=== "The City" ===
The "Negroes" were moving from the south to the cities for jobs, freedom and a chance to begin again. This, also known as a "human movement", made jazz and classical blues possible. They worked the hardest and got paid the least. Ford played an important role with their transition because it was one of the first companies to hire African Americans. They even created the first car that was available for purchase for African Americans. Blues first began as a "functional" music, only needed to communicate and encourage work in the fields, but soon emerged into something more. Blues music became entertaining. It morphed into what was called "the 'race' record", recordings of music targeted towards African Americans. Mamie Smith was the first African American to make a commercial recording in 1920. She replaced Sophie Tucker, a white singer who was unable to attend due to illness. After that, that "Jazz Age" began, otherwise known as the "age of recorded blues". Soon, African American musicians began being signed and selling thousands of copies. Their music began to spread all over. Companies even began hiring African Americans as talent scouts. To the surprise of many, African Americans became the new consumers in a predominantly white culture. Blues went from a small work sound to a nationwide phenomenon. Musicians in New York were very different from the ones in Chicago, St. Louis, Texas and New Orleans; the music of performers of the east had a ragtime style and was not as original, but eventually the real blues was absorbed in the east. People were only really able to hear the blues and real jazz in the lower-class "gutbucket" cabarets. World War I was a time where the Negroes became mainstream in American life. Negroes were welcomed into the services, in special black units. After World War I, there were race riots in America and Negroes started to think of the inequality as objective and "evil." Because of this, many groups were formed, such as Marcus Garvey's black nationalist organization, and also other groups that had already been around, like the NAACP regained popularity. Another type of blues music that came to the cities was called "boogie woogie", which was a blend of vocal blues and early guitar techniques, adapted for the piano. It was considered a music of rhythmic contrasts instead of melodic or harmonic variations. On weekends, Negroes would attend "blue light" parties. Each featured a few pianists, who would take turns playing while people would "grind". In 1929, the depression left over 14 million people unemployed and Negroes suffered most. This ruined the blues era; most night clubs and cabarets closed and the recording industry was destroyed. Events that shaped the present day American Negro included, World War I, the Great Depression, and World War II, and the migration to the cities.

=== "Enter the Middle Class" ===
"The movement, the growing feeling that developed among Negroes, was led and fattened by the growing black middle class".

In Chapter 9, Baraka's focus is on the cause and effect of the black middle class in the North. Negroes who held positions, such as house servants, freedmen and church officials, were seen as having a more privileged status among Negroes of this time. These individuals embodied the bulk of the black middle class. Although Negroes attempted to salvage their culture in the North, it was impossible to be free of the influence of "white America", drowning out the Negroes' past. The black middle class both responded and reacted to this by believing their culture should be completely forgotten, trying to erase their past and culture completely to be able to fit in. This, in turn, contributed to the growing support for cutting off Southerners in order to have a life in America. This divided and separated blacks, physically and mentally. All in all, the black middle class' attempt to fit into America around them, caused them to conform their own black culture, to the white culture that surrounded them. Not only did they attempt to change music, but media such as paintings, drama and literature changed, as a result of this attempt to assimilate into the culture around them.

=== "Swing—From Verb to Noun" ===
In this chapter, Baraka illustrates the importance of Negro artist to be a "quality" black man instead of a mere "ordinary nigger". Novelists such as Charles Chesnutt, Otis Shackleford, Sutton Griggs, and Pauline Hopkins demonstrated the idea of social classes within the black race in literature, similar to that of the "novel of their models", the white middle class. The separation created within the group gave a voice to the house servant. As the country became more liberal, in the early 1920s, Negroes were becoming the predominant urban population in the North, and there was the emergence of the "New Negro". This was the catalyst for the beginning of the "Negro Renaissance". The Negro middle-class mindset changed from the idea of separation, which was the "slave mentality", into "race pride" and "race consciousness", and a sense that Negroes deserved equality. The "Harlem School" of writers strove to glorify black America as a real production force, comparable to white America. These writers included Carl Van Vechten, author of the novel Nigger Heaven. Since the Emancipation, the blacks' adaptation to American life had been based on a growing and developing understanding of the white mind. In the book, Baraka illustrates the growing separation, in New Orleans between the Creoles, gens de couleur, and mulattoes. This separation was encouraged as a way to emulate the white French culture of New Orleans. Repressive segregation laws forced the "light people" into relationships with the black culture and this began the merging of black rhythmic and vocal tradition with European dance and march music. The first jazzmen were from the white Creole tradition and also the darker blues tradition. The music was the first fully developed American experience of "classic" blues.

In the second half of this chapter, Baraka breaks down the similarities and differences between two jazz stars: Louis Armstrong and Bix Beiderbecke. "The incredible irony of the situation was that both stood in similar places in the superstructure of American society: Beiderbecke, because of the isolation any deviation from mass culture imposed upon its bearer; and Armstrong, because of the socio-historical estrangement of the Negro from the rest of America. Nevertheless, the music the two made was as dissimilar as is possible within jazz." He goes on to draw a distinction between what he identifies as Beiderbecke's "white jazz" and Armstrong's jazz, which he sees as being "securely within the traditions of Afro-American music". Moreover, Baraka's broader critique of the place of Negro music in America is emphasized when he claims sarcastically, despite Beiderbecke's white jazz being essentially "antithetical" to Armstrong's, that "Afro-American music did not become a completely American expression until the white man could play it!" Baraka then goes on to chart the historical development of Armstrong's music as it became influenced by his performances and recordings with the Hot Five. He notes that though previous jazz bands were focused on an aesthetic based on a flexible group improvisation, Armstrong's presence in the Hot Five changed the dynamic of play and composition. Instead of a cohesive "communal" unit, the other members followed Armstrong's lead and therefore, he claims, the music made by the Hot Five became "Louis Armstrong's music".

Baraka goes on to write about the rise of the solo jazz artist and specifically Armstrong's influence on the tendencies and styles of jazz bands all over. His "brass music" was the predecessor of music featuring reed instruments that would follow. He writes about the bands playing in the 1920s and '30s and how the biggest and best of them were run and organized by predominately college-educated black men. These men worked for years to grow the music and integrate new waves of style as much as they could without sacrificing the elements that were so important to the identity of the music. Furthermore, Baraka writes about Duke Ellington's influence being similar in magnitude to Armstrong's but in a different way. He sees Ellington as perfecting the "orchestral" version of an expressive big band unit, while maintaining its jazz roots.

After this, much of the white middle-class culture adopted a taste for this new big band music that had the attitude and authenticity of the older black music but was modified, in part, to suit the modern symphony-going listener. This started transforming into the well-known swing music. When there became a market for this particular taste, white bands started trying to appropriate the style for the sake of performance and reaching broader audiences (a testament to the growing influence and significance of the Negro music movement). Unfortunately, Baraka points out, with the explosion in popularity, the industry for recording and producing music of this kind became somewhat monopolized by wealthy white record labels and producers. There was widespread discrimination against black performers, even after labels would pay good money for original scores written by someone else. This discrimination was evident too in the subsequent alienation of many Negro listeners, who became turned off by the appropriation and new mainstream success of what they felt and saw as their own music.

=== "The Blues Continuum" ===
Large jazz bands had begun to replace traditional blues, which had begun to move to the underground music scene. Southwestern "shouting" blues singers developed into a style called rhythm and blues, which was largely huge rhythm units smashing away behind screaming blues singers. The performance of the artists became just as important as the performance of the songs. Rhythm and blues, despite its growth in popularity, remained a "black" form of music that had not yet reached the level of commercialism where it would be popular in the white community. The more instrumental rhythm and blues use of large instruments complemented the traditional vocal style of classic blues. It however differed from traditional blues by having more erratic, louder percussion and brass sections to accompany the increased volume of the vocals. Rhythm and blues had developed into a style that integrated mainstream without being mainstream. With its rebellious style, rhythm and blues contrasted the mainstream "soft" nature of Swing with its loud percussion and brass sections, and because of its distinctive style remained a predominantly "black" form of music that catered to an African American audience. There was divide however between the middle class of African Americans, who had settled upon mainstream swing and the lower class, who still had a taste for traditional country blues. Over time, the mainstream sounds of swing became embedded so far into rhythm and blues that it became indistinguishable from its country blues roots and into a commercialized style.

=== "The Modern Scene" ===
As white Americans adopted styles of blues and adopted this new expression of music, jazz became the more accepted "American" music, which related to a broader audience and was accepted for commercial use. Through this evolution of blues into jazz and this idea that jazz could be more socially diverse and appeal to a broader range of Americans, blues started to become less appreciated while jazz represented the "true expression of an American which could be celebrated". Copying the oppressive ideas that segregated the people between white and black blues was devalued and the assimilation of both African Americans and their music into being considered "American culture" was next to impossible. As years went on there was a failure to see that the more popular mainstream sounds of swing and jazz and "white" wartime entertainment was a result of the black American tradition, blues created by the very people that America was trying so hard to oppress. In efforts to try to re-create their own sound once more and create their own culture of music, they began with their roots in blues and evolved their sounds of the past into a new sound, bebop.
