= A Black Mass =

1966 play written by Amiri Baraka

- Original language: English
- Written by: Amiri Baraka

Premiere
- Date: 1966

A Black Mass is a play written by Amiri Baraka and performed at Proctor's Theatre in Newark, New Jersey in 1966. Baraka also recorded a version of the play with Sun Ra's Myth-Science Orchestra in 1968. The play is based on the religious doctrine of Yakub as taught by the Nation of Islam, and it describes the origin of white people according to this doctrine.

A Black Mass, written at the beginning of Baraka's involvement in black nationalism and the Black Arts Movement, was a turning point in the artist's career. Conceived as a form of "action literature", the play aimed to raise the political consciousness of Black Americans. Baraka had learned of the Yakub myth from Malcolm X, whose assassination in 1965 likely provided further inspiration for the work.

This play is a visceral experience through the use of music and lighting, beginning in a "Jet blackness" accompanied with the "Music of eternal concentration and wisdom" composed by Sun Ra, which represent a prelapsarian state of non-threatening darkness. Baraka inverts the idea that white symbolizes goodness and black symbolizes wickedness, so that the images of beauty and life are associated with blackness. As Jacoub, the protagonist of the play, creates the "White Beast" that will become the ancestor to the white race, this peaceful blackness is soon contrasted with scenes of pandemonium, in which the room is filled with unsettling melodies and the sounds of banging and screeching (provided in the original production by Sun Ra's Myth Science Arkestra). To add to the audience's unease, the actors are not confined to the stage: the "Beast" leaps among the spectators, screaming "White! White! White!" and "Me! Me! Me!"

The play ends on a call to arms against this newly created affront against nature:

And so Brothers and Sisters, these beasts are still loose in the world. Still, they spit their hideous cries. There are beasts in our world, Brothers and Sisters. There are beasts in our world. Let us find them and slay them. Let us lock them in their caves. Let us declare the holy war. The Jihad. Or we cannot deserve to live. Izm-el-Azam. Izm-el-Azam. Izm-el-Azam.

— Amiri Baraka, Four Black Revolutionary Plays: All Praises to the Black Man (1969)

The final statement, which means "May God have mercy," is repeated continuously until the lights go dark.
