= Kellie Jones =

American art historian and curator (born 1959)

- Jones in 2016
- Born: 1959 (age 66–67)
- Awards: MacArthur Fellow, 2016

Academic background
- Education: Amherst College (B.A.); Yale University (Ph.D.)

Academic work
- Discipline: Art History
- Institutions: Columbia University

Kellie Jones (born 1959) is an American art historian and curator. She is a professor in art history and archaeology at the Institute for Research in African-American Studies, Columbia University. She won a MacArthur Fellowship in 2016. In 2023, she was elected to the American Philosophical Society.

== Biography ==
Jones is the daughter of poets Hettie Jones and Amiri Baraka. Jones graduated from Amherst College in 1981. She later earned a Ph.D. from Yale University in 1999.

Her research interests include African Diaspora and African American artists, Latin American and Latino/a artists, and problems in contemporary art and museum theory. Jones has been published in journals such as NKA, Artforum, Flash Art, Atlantica, and Third Text. Jones has worked as a curator for over three decades.

Her sister is author and essayist Lisa Jones. Jones has a half-sister, Dominique di Prima, from Baraka's relationship with Beat poet Diane di Prima, and a half-brother, Newark, New Jersey mayor Ras Baraka.

== Awards and honors ==
- 2005: David C. Driskell Prize.
- 2012: Artist-in-Residence at the McColl Center for Art + Innovation
- 2013: Andy Warhol Foundation Art Writers Grant.
- 2013: Terra Foundation Fellow.
- 2016: MacArthur Fellows Program award.
- 2018: College Art Association Award for Excellence in Diversity.
- 2019: American Academy of Arts and Sciences Fellow.

== Curated exhibits ==
Curated and co-curated exhibits:

- Basquiat. New York: Brooklyn Museum, March 11, 2005 through June 5, 2005. Co-curators include Marc Mayer, Fred Hoffman, Kellie Jones, and Franklin Sirmans.
- Energy / Experimentation: Black Artists and Abstraction, 1964-1980. New York: The Studio Museum in Harlem, 2006.
- Now Dig This! Art and Black Los Angeles, 1960–1980. Los Angeles: Hammer Museum, October 2, 2011 – January 8, 2012; MOMA PS1 in Long Island City, New York, from October 21, 2012 – March 11, 2013; and at the Williams College Museum of Art in Williamstown, MA, from July 20-December 1, 2013.
- Witness: Art and Civil Rights in the Sixties. New York: Brooklyn Museum, March 7–July 13, 2014. Co-curated by Teresa A. Carbone and Kellie Jones.

== Books ==
- Jones, Kellie (2002). Lorna Simpson. London: Phaidon Press. ISBN 0714840386
- Jones, Kellie (2011). EyeMinded: Living And Writing Contemporary Art. Durham: Duke University Press. ISBN 978-0822348733
- Jones, Kellie (2011). Now Dig This!: Art & Black Los Angeles, 1960-1980. Los Angeles: Hammer Museum. ISBN 978-3791351360
- Jones, Kellie (2017). South of Pico: African American Artists in Los Angeles in the 1960s and 1970s. Durham: Duke University Press. ISBN 978-0822361640
