= Dominique di Prima =

LA radio personality and activist

Dominique di Prima (born June 4, 1962) is a radio personality, producer and activist in Los Angeles. Her work focuses on issues concerning African American communities. Since 2005 she has hosted The Front Page, a morning show on Radio Free 102.3 KJLH.

Di Prima was the host and producer of the talk show Street Science with Dominique di Prima for almost nine years on 100.3-FM The Beat. Street Science won L.A. Weekly "Best of L.A." award, and a Gracie Award from the American Women in Radio and Television. Prior to her work in radio di Prima worked in television for San Francisco NBC affiliate KRON-TV. Di Prima has won five Emmy Awards, six Parents' Choice Awards, an Ollie and the SAG/AFTRA American Scene Award for positive portrayals of women, the disabled, senior citizens and people of color. In May 2017 di Prima was honored as "Pioneer Woman of the Year" at the Los Angeles City Hall.

Dominique di Prima is the daughter of Amiri Baraka and Diane di Prima, both deceased. She grew up in New York and California. She is married to Guillermo Cespedes, a deputy mayor of Los Angeles. Through her father, di Prima has eight half-siblings, among them Kellie and Lisa Jones, and Ras Baraka, mayor of Newark, New Jersey.

In 1981, she and the band Appliances released a political hip-hop EP called Paranoia Rap, which billed itself as "punk funk rap." In 1999, di Prima played Megan McLean in the episode "The Goldberg Variation" of the television show The X-Files.
