= Diane di Prima =

American poet (1934–2020)

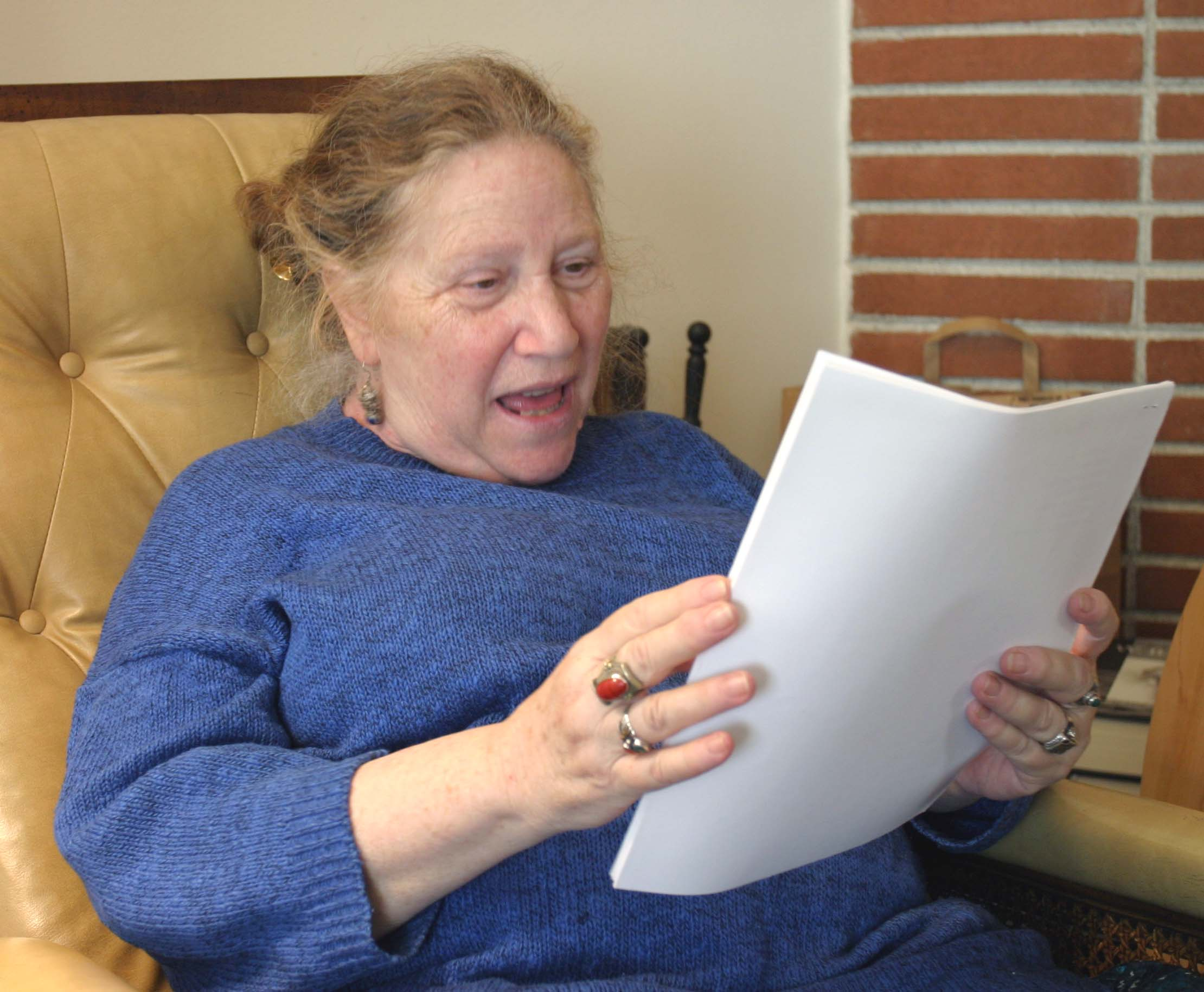
- Diane di Prima, photo by Gloria Graham during the video taping of Add-Verse, 2004
- Born: August 6, 1934; Brooklyn, New York City, New York, U.S.
- Died: October 25, 2020 (aged 86); San Francisco, California, U.S.
- Education: Hunter College High School; Swarthmore College
- Occupations: Poet; author; artist
- Children: Dominique di Prima
- Writing career
- Years active: 1958–2020
- Movement: Beat movement

Diane di Prima (August 6, 1934 – October 25, 2020) was an American poet, known for her association with the Beat movement. She was also an artist, prose writer, and teacher. Her magnum opus is widely considered to be Loba, a collection of poems first published in 1978 then extended in 1998.

== Early life and education ==
Di Prima was born in Brooklyn, New York, on August 6, 1934 and raised in Carroll Gardens. She was a second generation American of Italian descent. Her father Francis was a lawyer, and her mother Emma (née Mallozzi) was a teacher. Her maternal grandfather, Domenico Mallozzi, was an activist and associated with anarchists Carlo Tresca and Emma Goldman. Di Prima changed her last name from DiPrima to di Prima because she believed it better reflected her Italian ancestry.

She attended academically elite Hunter College High School where she became part of a small group of friends including classmate Audre Lorde who formed a sort of Dead Poets Society calling themselves "the Branded". They cut class to roam the city, hanging out in bookstores, sharing their own poetry and holding séances for dead poets.

Di Prima then went on to Swarthmore College before dropping out to be a poet in Manhattan. Di Prima began writing as a child and by the age of 19 was living in the Ukranian Village neighborhood of Manhattan's Lower East Side, corresponding with Ezra Pound and Kenneth Patchen. Her first book of poetry, This Kind of Bird Flies Backward, was published in 1958 by Hettie Jones and LeRoi Jones' Totem Press.

== Career ==
=== Involvement with the Beats ===
Di Prima spent the late 1950s and early 1960s in Manhattan, where she participated in the emerging Beat movement. She spent some time in California at Stinson Beach and Topanga Canyon, returned to New York City, and eventually moved to San Francisco permanently.

She edited the newspaper The Floating Bear with Amiri Baraka (LeRoi Jones) and was co-founder of the New York Poets Theatre and founder of the Poets Press. On several occasions she faced charges of obscenity by the United States government due to her work with the New York Poets Theatre and The Floating Bear. In 1961 she was arrested by the Federal Bureau of Investigation (FBI) for publishing two poems in The Floating Bear. According to di Prima, police persistently harassed her due to the nature of her poetry. In 1966, she spent some time at Millbrook with Timothy Leary's psychedelic community.

From 1974 to 1997, di Prima taught poetry at the Jack Kerouac School of Disembodied Poetics, of the Naropa Institute in Boulder, Colorado, sharing the program with fellow Beats Allen Ginsberg and Anne Waldman (co-founders of the program), William Burroughs, Gregory Corso, and others.

=== Later career ===
In the late 1960s, di Prima moved permanently to California. There, she became involved with the Diggers and studied Buddhism, Sanskrit, Gnosticism, and alchemy. In 1966, she signed a vow of tax resistance to the Vietnam War. In the 1970s, she published the collection Revolutionary Letters, influenced by her time with the Diggers. At The Band's famous Last Waltz concert in 1976, she read aloud from Revolutionary Letters and the one-line poem "Get Yer Cut Throat Off My Knife".

She published her major work, the long poem Loba, in 1978, with an enlarged edition in 1998. From the 1960s on she worked as a photographer and a collage artist, and in the last decade or so of her life she took up watercolor painting.

From 1980 to 1987, di Prima taught Hermetic and esoteric traditions in poetry, in a short-lived but significant Masters-in-Poetics program at New College of California, which she established together with poets Robert Duncan and David Meltzer. She also taught at the San Francisco Art Institute. She was one of the co-founders of San Francisco Institute of Magical and Healing Arts (SIMHA), where she taught Western spiritual traditions from 1983 to 1992.

In 2009, di Prima became San Francisco's poet laureate.

== Activism ==
Di Prima was known for her activism, having been exposed early on to political consciousness by her grandfather, Domenico, as detailed in her memoir Recollections of My Life as a Woman; she also discusses this in a 2001 interview with David Hadbawnik. In her memoir, di Prima describes seeing her grandfather speak at a rally in the park, writing: "I am proud of him, and afraid, but mostly amazed. His words have awakened my full acknowledgment, consent. I hear what he says as truth, and it seems I have always known it. I feel old, self-contained, passionate with the pure passion of a child." Moments such as these sparked a dedication to social activism, especially as it concerned women's rights, that persisted throughout di Prima's life.

== Death and legacy ==
Di Prima died on October 25, 2020, at San Francisco General Hospital. She was 86 years old. She had several health issues including Parkinson's disease and Sjögren syndrome. She was working on several books until two weeks prior to her death. Di Prima's works are held at the University of Louisville, Indiana University, Southern Illinois University, and the University of North Carolina at Chapel Hill.

== Bibliography ==
=== Poetry ===
Collections

- This Kind of Bird Flies Backward. New York: Totem Press. 1958.
- Dinners and Nightmares. Corinth Books. 1961. (reissued Last Gasp, 1998)
- The New Handbook of Heaven. San Francisco: Auerhahn Press. 1963.
- Seven Love Poems from the Middle Latin. The Poets Press. 1965. (translations)
- Freddie Poems. Point Reyes: Eidolon Editions. 1966.
- Earthsong: Poems 1957–1959. New York: The Poets Press. 1968.
- War Poems. New York: The Poets Press. 1968.
- The Book of Hours. San Francisco: Brownstone Press. 1970.
- Kerhonkson Journal 1966. Berkeley, California: Oyez. 1971.
- Revolutionary Letters. City Lights. 1971. (expanded edition, City Lights, 2021)
- The Calculus of Variation. San Francisco: Eidolon Editions. 1972.
- Selected Poems: 1956-1975. Plainfield: North Atlantic Books. 1975.
- The Bell Tower. Evanston, Illinois: No Mountains Poetry Project. 1976.
- Loba, Part II. Point Reyes: Eidolon Editions. 1976.
- Selected Poems: 1956-1976. North Atlantic Books. 1977.
- Loba, Parts 1-8. 1978.
- Pieces of a Song: Selected Poems. City Lights. 1990.
- Seminary Poems. Floating Island Publications. 1991.
- The Moon and the Island. Berkeley, California: Hesperia Press. 1997.
- Recollections of My Life as a Woman: The New York Years. New York: Viking Press. 2001.
- Towers Down: Notes Toward a Poem of Revolution. San Francisco: Eidolon Editions. 2002.
- The Ones I Used to Laugh With: A Haibun Journal. Habenicht Press. 2003.
- Kit Fox Blues. San Francisco: Eidolon Editions. 2006.
- R.D.'s H.D. New York: Center for the Humanities, the Graduate Center. 2011.
- The Mysteries of Vision: Some Notes on H.D. New York: Center for the Humanities, the Graduate Center. 2011.
- Old Father, Old Artificer. New York: Center for the Humanities, Graduate Center. 2012.
- The Poetry Deal. City Lights. 2014.
- Haiku. Los Angeles: X Artists' Books. 2019.
- Spring and Autumn Annals: A Celebration of the Seasons for Freddie. City Lights. 2021.
- Revolutionary Letters: 50th Anniversary Edition. City Lights. 2021.

== Novels ==
- Memoirs of a Beatnik. New York: Olympia Press. 1969. (reissued with new afterword, Last Gasp, 1988)

List of poems

Title	Year	First published	Reprinted/collected
Radio	2023	Di Prima, Diane (March 27, 2023). "Radio". The New Yorker. 99 (6): 24.	

She also published in literary journals such as Earth's Daughters.

== Sources ==
- Charters, Ann (ed.). The Portable Beat Reader. New York: Penguin Books, 1992. ISBN 0-670-83885-3 (hc); ISBN 0-14-015102-8 (pbk)
- di Prima, Diane, and Jones, LeRoi [Imanu Amiri Baraka], eds. The Floating Bear, a newsletter: Numbers 1-37, 1961–1969. Introduction and notes adapted from interviews with Diane di Prima. La Jolla, California: Laurence McGilvery, 1973. ISBN 0-910938-54-7 (library binding)
- di Prima, Diane. Recollections of My Life as a Woman. Viking USA (2001). ISBN 0-670-85166-3
