= Wallington, New Jersey =

Borough in Bergen County, New Jersey, US

- Borough
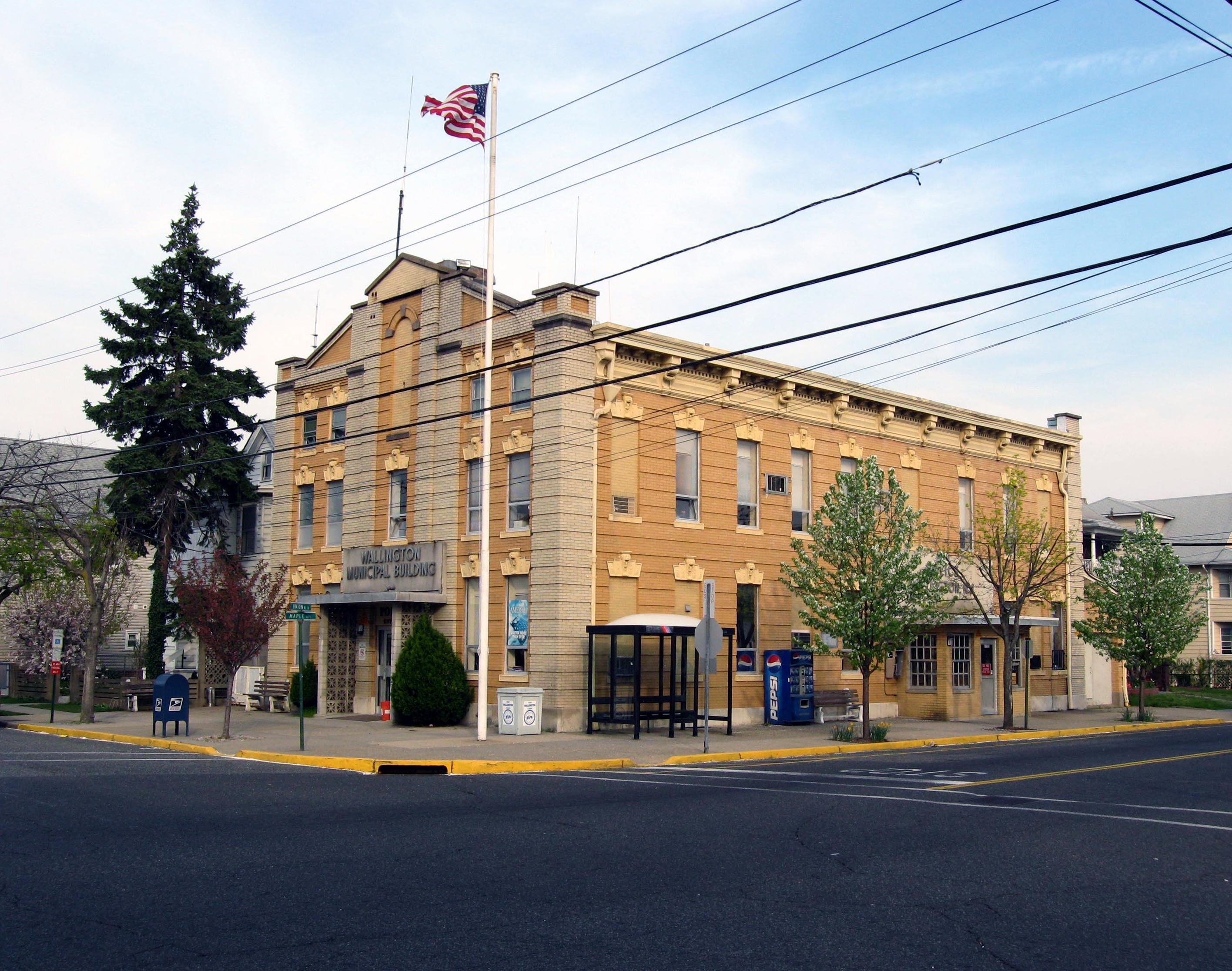
- Police Station/Courthouse

- Seal

- Location of Wallington in Bergen County highlighted in red (left). Inset map: Location of Bergen County in New Jersey highlighted in orange (right).

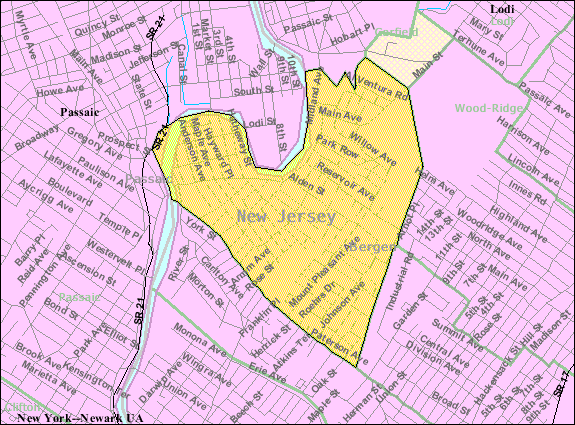
- Census Bureau map of Wallington, New Jersey

- Location in Bergen County Location in New Jersey Location in the United States
- Coordinates: 40.853084°N 74.106323°W
- Country: United States
- State: New Jersey
- County: Bergen
- Incorporated: December 31, 1894
- Named for: Walling Van Winkle

Government
  - Type: Borough
  - Body: Borough Council
  - Mayor: Melissa Dabal (R, term ends December 31, 2023)
  - Administrator: Michael Kazimir
  - Municipal clerk: Ace Antonio (acting)

Area
  - Total: 1.05 sq mi (2.71 km^{2})
  - Land: 0.99 sq mi (2.57 km^{2})
  - Water: 0.054 sq mi (0.14 km^{2}) 5.05%
  - Rank: 496th of 565 in state 64th of 70 in county
- Elevation: 20 ft (6.1 m)

Population (2020)
  - Total: 11,868
  - Estimate (2023): 11,825
  - Rank: 213th of 565 in state 31st of 70 in county
  - Density: 11,939.6/sq mi (4,609.9/km^{2})
  - Rank: 26th of 565 in state 7th of 70 in county
- Time zone: UTC−05:00 (Eastern (EST))
  - Summer (DST): UTC−04:00 (Eastern (EDT))
- ZIP Code: 07057
- Area codes: 201 and 973
- FIPS code: 3400376490
- GNIS feature ID: 0885430
- Website: www.wallingtonnj.org

Wallington is a borough in Bergen County, in the U.S. state of New Jersey. As of the 2020 United States census, the borough's population was 11,868, an increase of 533 (+4.7%) from the 2010 census count of 11,335, which in turn reflected a decline of 248 (−2.1%) from the 11,583 counted in the 2000 census.

Wallington was created as a borough on January 2, 1895, based on a referendum held on December 31, 1894, from area taken from Bergen Township and Saddle River Township. The borough was formed during the "Boroughitis" phenomenon then sweeping through New Jersey, in which 26 boroughs were formed in Bergen County alone in 1894, with Wallington the last of the 26 to be formed by an 1894 referendum. Sections of Wallington were ceded to Garfield in 1898. The borough is said to have been named for Walling Van Winkle (1650–1725), who built a home in the future borough. In the early 1900s Wallington was advertised as a "Slovak colony" for Slovak migrants living in urban areas to find suburban real estate.

== Geography ==
According to the United States Census Bureau, the borough had a total area of 1.05 square miles (2.71 km^{2}), including 0.99 square miles (2.57 km^{2}) of land and 0.05 square miles (0.14 km^{2}) of water (5.05%). A large tract of 33 acres (13 ha) along Main Avenue was once the site of Farmland Dairies processing plant until 2014 and has been designated as an area of redevelopment though borough residents have stressed that it may not be used as a data center.

The borough borders Carlstadt, East Rutherford, Garfield, South Hackensack and Wood-Ridge in Bergen County, and the city of Passaic in Passaic County across the Passaic River. The borough is located approximately 15 miles (24 km) northwest of Midtown Manhattan.

== Demographics ==
Historical population
Census	Pop.	Note	%±
1900	1,812		—
1910	3,448		90.3%
1920	5,715		65.7%
1930	9,063		58.6%
1940	8,981		−0.9%
1950	8,910		−0.8%
1960	9,261		3.9%
1970	10,284		11.0%
1980	10,741		4.4%
1990	10,828		0.8%
2000	11,583		7.0%
2010	11,335		−2.1%
2020	11,868		4.7%
2023 (est.)	11,825	▼	−0.4%
Population sources: 1900–1920 1900–1910; 1910–1930 1900–2020; 2000 2010 2020

The borough is one of 41 municipalities statewide where a majority of residents do not speak English as their primary language. Based on data from the United States Census Bureau's 2012–2016 American Community Survey data, Wallington had 62.8% of residents not speaking English as their dominant language, the 13th highest perecentage in the state.

=== Racial and ethnic composition ===
Wallington borough, New Jersey – Racial and ethnic composition Note: the US Census treats Hispanic/Latino as an ethnic category. This table excludes Latinos from the racial categories and assigns them to a separate category. Hispanics/Latinos may be of any race.
Race / Ethnicity (NH = Non-Hispanic)	Pop 2000	Pop 2010	Pop 2020	% 2000	% 2010	% 2020
White alone (NH)	9,733	9,048	8,286	84.03%	79.82%	69.82%
Black or African American alone (NH)	284	303	320	2.45%	2.67%	2.70%
Native American or Alaska Native alone (NH)	7	14	11	0.06%	0.12%	0.09%
Asian alone (NH)	574	610	694	4.96%	5.38%	5.85%
Native Hawaiian or Pacific Islander alone (NH)	0	0	6	0.00%	0.00%	0.05%
Other race alone (NH)	8	17	91	0.07%	0.15%	0.77%
Mixed race or Multiracial (NH)	201	118	161	1.74%	1.04%	1.36%
Hispanic or Latino (any race)	776	1,225	2,299	6.70%	10.81%	19.37%
Total	11,583	11,335	11,868	100.00%	100.00%	100.00%

=== 2020 census ===
As of the 2020 census, Wallington had a population of 11,868. The median age was 40.5 years. 18.2% of residents were under the age of 18 and 15.1% were 65 years of age or older. For every 100 females, there were 96.6 males, and for every 100 females age 18 and over there were 93.2 males.

100.0% of residents lived in urban areas, while 0.0% lived in rural areas.

There were 4,825 households in Wallington, of which 28.1% had children under the age of 18 living in them. Of all households, 44.2% were married-couple households, 21.4% were households with a male householder and no spouse or partner present, and 28.7% were households with a female householder and no spouse or partner present. About 28.5% of all households were made up of individuals and 10.3% had someone living alone who was 65 years of age or older.

There were 5,108 housing units, of which 5.5% were vacant. The homeowner vacancy rate was 0.8% and the rental vacancy rate was 4.8%.

=== 2010 census ===
The 2010 United States census counted 11,335 people, 4,637 households, and 2,991 families in the borough. The population density was 11,528.6 per square mile (4,451.2/km^{2}). There were 4,946 housing units at an average density of 5,030.5 per square mile (1,942.3/km^{2}). The racial makeup was 85.48% (9,689) White, 3.23% (366) Black or African American, 0.16% (18) Native American, 5.57% (631) Asian, 0.00% (0) Pacific Islander, 3.86% (438) from other races, and 1.70% (193) from two or more races. Hispanic or Latino of any race were 10.81% (1,225) of the population.

Of the 4,637 households, 25.4% had children under the age of 18; 48.0% were married couples living together; 11.1% had a female householder with no husband present and 35.5% were non-families. Of all households, 29.1% were made up of individuals and 9.4% had someone living alone who was 65 years of age or older. The average household size was 2.44 and the average family size was 3.03.

18.0% of the population were under the age of 18, 8.1% from 18 to 24, 31.5% from 25 to 44, 28.9% from 45 to 64, and 13.5% who were 65 years of age or older. The median age was 39.6 years. For every 100 females, the population had 94.4 males. For every 100 females ages 18 and older there were 91.6 males.

The Census Bureau's 2006–2010 American Community Survey showed that (in 2010 inflation-adjusted dollars) median household income was $58,724 (with a margin of error of +/− $3,808) and the median family income was $66,414 (+/− $7,756). Males had a median income of $46,632 (+/− $3,029) versus $40,968 (+/− $2,962) for females. The per capita income for the borough was $27,350 (+/− $1,947). About 7.0% of families and 8.7% of the population were below the poverty line, including 8.8% of those under age 18 and 10.1% of those age 65 or over.

Same-sex couples headed 25 households in 2010, a decrease from the 30 counted in 2000.

=== 2000 census ===
Languages (2000)	Percent
Spoke English at home	47.64%
Spoke Polish at home	40.79%
Spoke Spanish at home	4.68%
Spoke Italian at home	2.51%
Spoke Arabic at home	1.64%
Spoke Gujarati at home	1.49%
Spoke Korean at home	0.58%
Spoke Hindi at home	0.53%
Spoke German at home	0.14%

As of the 2000 United States census there were 11,583 people, 4,752 households, and 3,041 families residing in the borough. The population density was 11,632.5 inhabitants per square mile (4,491.3/km^{2}). There were 4,906 housing units at an average density of 4,927.0 per square mile (1,902.3/km^{2}). The racial makeup of the borough was 87.60% White, 2.67% African American, 0.09% Native American, 4.98% Asian, 0.02% Pacific Islander, 2.32% from other races, and 2.31% from two or more races. Hispanic or Latino of any race were 6.70% of the population.

There were 4,752 households, out of which 25.7% had children under the age of 18 living with them, 48.3% were married couples living together, 11.5% had a female householder with no husband present, and 36.0% were non-families. 29.8% of all households were made up of individuals, and 11.4% had someone living alone who was 65 years of age or older. The average household size was 2.44 and the average family size was 3.05.

In the borough the population was spread out, with 18.4% under the age of 18, 8.8% from 18 to 24, 33.9% from 25 to 44, 23.7% from 45 to 64, and 15.2% who were 65 years of age or older. The median age was 38 years. For every 100 females, there were 93.0 males. For every 100 females age 18 and over, there were 90.2 males.

The median income for a household in the borough was $45,656, and the median income for a family was $55,291. Males had a median income of $40,077 versus $30,503 for females. The per capita income for the borough was $24,431. About 4.8% of families and 6.3% of the population were below the poverty line, including 6.8% of those under age 18 and 4.4% of those age 65 or over.

The most common ancestries were Polish (51.5%), Italian (15.0%), Irish (7.1%) and German.

At 51.5%, Wallington has one of the highest per capita levels of Polish ancestry in the area. Wallington was ranked seventh nationwide and first in New Jersey among municipalities in the United States by percentage of population with Polish ancestry as of the 2000 Census.

== Arts and culture ==
Each December, Wallington holds a holiday parade. Fire departments and ambulances from the surrounding area (including the Wallington Fire Department) put Christmas lights on their trucks. There is a contest to determine which department's apparatus has the best Christmas lights. The winning department gets a trophy.

== Parks and recreation ==
Samuel Nelkin County Park is located on Parkview Drive, covering 17 acres (6.9 ha). It has a playground, tennis courts, athletic fields, a dog park, picnic areas, and a shallow, artificial pond for fishing.

Borough parks and green spaces include:

- Dul Field, which is home to a baseball/softball field and a playground.
- Spring Street Soccer Field, which has baseball/softball and soccer facilities as well as a concession stand.
- Little League Field/Park, which is a little league baseball field and also features a playground, basketball courts, and a concession stand.
- Crescent Park, which is a green space with a playground.
- Hathaway Street Skate Park, which has a roller hockey rink and playground.
- Washington Crossing Park, which features a green space, gazebo, and monument on the banks of the Passaic River.
- Wallington High School Athletic Field, which is between Wallington High School and Frank W. Gavlak Elementary School, has football, soccer, and baseball/softball fields.

Lucky Strike Wallington is a bowling alley that has 48 lanes, an arcade, restaurant and bar.

== Government ==
=== Local government ===
Wallington is governed under the Borough form of New Jersey municipal government, which is used in 218 municipalities (of the 564) statewide, making it the most common form of government in New Jersey. The governing body is comprised of a mayor and a borough council, with all positions elected at-large on a partisan basis as part of the November general election. A mayor is elected directly by the voters to a four-year term of office. The borough council includes six members elected to serve three-year terms on a staggered basis, with two seats coming up for election each year in a three-year cycle. The borough form of government used by Wallington is a "weak mayor / strong council" government in which council members act as the legislative body with the mayor presiding at meetings and voting only in the event of a tie. The mayor can veto ordinances subject to an override by a two-thirds majority vote of the council. The mayor makes committee and liaison assignments for council members, and most appointments are made by the mayor with the advice and consent of the council.

As of 2023, the Mayor of Wallington Borough is Republican Melissa Dabal, whose term of office ends December 31, 2023. Members of the Wallington Borough Council are Council President WendySu Ivanicki (R, 2023), Khaldoun Androwis (R, 2024), Beata Balik (R, 2025), Susanne Preinfalk (R, 2025), Eugeniusz Rachelski (R, 2024) and Tomasz Sadecki (R, 2023).

In December 2021, the borough council selected Beata Balik from a list of three candidates nominated by the Republican municipal committee to fill the seat expiring in December 2022 that became vacant following the resignation of Tomasz Orzechowski.

=== Federal, state and county representation ===
Wallington is located in the 9th Congressional District and is part of New Jersey's 36th state legislative district.

For the 119th United States Congress, New Jersey's 9th congressional district is represented by Nellie Pou (D, North Haledon) New Jersey is represented in the United States Senate by Democrats Cory Booker (Newark, term ends 2027) and Andy Kim (Moorestown, term ends 2031).

For the 2026–2027 session, the 36th legislative district of the New Jersey Legislature is represented in the State Senate by Paul Sarlo (D, Wood-Ridge) and in the General Assembly by Clinton Calabrese (D, Cliffside Park) and Gary Schaer (D, Passaic).

Bergen County is governed by a directly elected County Executive, with legislative functions performed by a Board of County Commissioners comprised of seven members who are elected at-large to three-year terms in partisan elections on a staggered basis, with either two or three seats coming up for election each November; a Chairman and Vice Chairman are selected from among its seven members at a reorganization meeting held every January. As of 2025, the county executive is James J. Tedesco III (D, Paramus), whose four-year term of office ends December 31, 2026.

Bergen County's Commissioners are Chair Mary J. Amoroso (D, Mahwah, 2025), Vice Chair Steven A. Tanelli (D, North Arlington, 2027), Chair Pro Tem Joan Voss (D, Fort Lee, 2026), Rafael Marte (D, Bergenfield, 2026), Germaine M. Ortiz (D, Emerson, 2025), Thomas J. Sullivan Jr. (D, Montvale, 2025) and Tracy Silna Zur (D, Franklin Lakes, 2027).

Bergen County's elected constitutional officials are Clerk John S. Hogan (D, Northvale, 2026), Sheriff Anthony Cureton (D, Englewood, 2027) and Surrogate Michael R. Dressler (D, Cresskill, 2026).

=== Politics ===
As of March 2011, there were a total of 4,964 registered voters in Wallington, of which 1,428 (28.8% vs. 31.7% countywide) were registered as Democrats, 681 (13.7% vs. 21.1%) were registered as Republicans and 2,852 (57.5% vs. 47.1%) were registered as Unaffiliated. There were 3 voters registered as Libertarians or Greens. Among the borough's 2010 Census population, 43.8% (vs. 57.1% in Bergen County) were registered to vote, including 53.4% of those ages 18 and over (vs. 73.7% countywide).

Gubernatorial election results for Wallington
Year	Republican		Democratic		Third party(ies)	
Year	No.	%	No.	%	No.	%
2025	1,607	53.12%	1,402	46.35%	16	0.53%
2021	1,551	62.97%	886	35.97%	26	1.06%
2017	1,012	51.55%	898	45.75%	53	2.70%
2013	1,365	63.58%	754	35.12%	28	1.30%
2009	1,131	48.48%	1,053	45.14%	149	6.39%
2005	993	39.69%	1,416	56.59%	93	3.72%

In the 2016 presidential election, Republican Donald Trump received 2,222 votes (55.7% vs. 41.1% countywide), ahead of Democrat Hillary Clinton with 1,643 votes (41.2% vs. 54.2%) and other candidates with 126 votes (3.2% vs. 4.6%), among the 4,039 ballots cast by the borough's 5,869 registered voters, for a turnout of 68.8% (vs. 72.5% in Bergen County). In the 2012 presidential election, Democrat Barack Obama received 1,967 votes (54.4% vs. 54.8% countywide), ahead of Republican Mitt Romney with 1,548 votes (42.8% vs. 43.5%) and other candidates with 59 votes (1.6% vs. 0.9%), among the 3,615 ballots cast by the borough's 5,384 registered voters, for a turnout of 67.1% (vs. 70.4% in Bergen County). In the 2008 presidential election, Democrat Barack Obama received 1,912 votes (50.4% vs. 53.9% countywide), ahead of Republican John McCain with 1,783 votes (47.0% vs. 44.5%) and other candidates with 54 votes (1.4% vs. 0.8%), among the 3,793 ballots cast by the borough's 5,370 registered voters, for a turnout of 70.6% (vs. 76.8% in Bergen County). In the 2004 presidential election, Democrat John Kerry received 1,963 votes (53.2% vs. 51.7% countywide), ahead of Republican George W. Bush with 1,668 votes (45.2% vs. 47.2%) and other candidates with 18 votes (0.5% vs. 0.7%), among the 3,690 ballots cast by the borough's 5,187 registered voters, for a turnout of 71.1% (vs. 76.9% in the whole county).

United States presidential election results for Wallington 2024 2020 2016 2012 2008 2004
Year	Republican		Democratic		Third party(ies)	
Year	No.	%	No.	%	No.	%
2024	2,857	63.82%	1,534	34.26%	86	1.92%
2020	2,772	57.31%	1,999	41.33%	66	1.36%
2016	2,222	55.68%	1,643	41.17%	126	3.16%
2012	1,548	43.31%	1,967	55.04%	59	1.65%
2008	1,783	47.87%	1,912	51.33%	30	0.81%
2004	1,663	45.64%	1,963	53.87%	18	0.49%

In the 2013 gubernatorial election, Republican Chris Christie received 63.6% of the vote (1,365 cast), ahead of Democrat Barbara Buono with 35.1% (754 votes), and other candidates with 1.3% (28 votes), among the 2,264 ballots cast by the borough's 5,138 registered voters (117 ballots were spoiled), for a turnout of 44.1%. In the 2009 gubernatorial election, Republican Chris Christie received 1,131 votes (47.5% vs. 45.8% countywide), ahead of Democrat Jon Corzine with 1,053 votes (44.2% vs. 48.0%), Independent Chris Daggett with 129 votes (5.4% vs. 4.7%) and other candidates with 20 votes (0.8% vs. 0.5%), among the 2,383 ballots cast by the borough's 5,191 registered voters, yielding a 45.9% turnout (vs. 50.0% in the county).

United States Senate election results for Wallington1
Year	Republican		Democratic		Third party(ies)	
Year	No.	%	No.	%	No.	%
2024	2,363	59.61%	1,469	37.06%	132	3.33%
2018	1,573	52.45%	1,345	44.85%	81	2.70%
2012	1,238	38.72%	1,840	57.55%	119	3.72%
2006	1,120	45.02%	,1334	53.62%	34	1.37%

United States Senate election results for Wallington2
Year	Republican		Democratic		Third party(ies)	
Year	No.	%	No.	%	No.	%
2020	2,445	52.84%	2,074	44.82%	108	2.33%
2014	832	44.26%	989	52.61%	59	3.14%
2013	534	51.74%	486	47.09%	12	1.16%
2008	1,351	41.75%	1,832	56.61%	53	1.64%

== Education ==
The Wallington Public Schools serve students in pre-kindergarten through twelfth grade. As of the 2024–25 school year, the district, comprised of three schools, had an enrollment of 1,232 students and 88.6 classroom teachers (on an FTE basis), for a student–teacher ratio of 13.9:1. Schools in the district (with 2024–25 enrollment data from the National Center for Education Statistics) are Jefferson Elementary School with 253 students in grades K–2, Frank W. Gavlak Elementary School with 361 students in grades 3–6 and Wallington High School with 545 students in grades 7–12.

Public school students from the borough, and all of Bergen County, are eligible to attend the secondary education programs offered by the Bergen County Technical Schools, which include the Bergen County Academies in Hackensack, and the Bergen Tech campus in Teterboro or Paramus. The district offers programs on a shared-time or full-time basis, with admission based on a selective application process and tuition covered by the student's home school district.

Due to declining enrollment, the Roman Catholic Archdiocese of Newark closed Most Sacred Heart School after the 2013–2014 school year. The school district is in talks with the Archdiocese to temporarily lease Most Sacred Heart School starting during the 2014–2015 school year, so that Jefferson Elementary School can be closed for repair/rebuilding without straining the capacity of Frank W. Gavlak Elementary School.

== Emergency services ==
=== Police ===
The Wallington Police Department (WPD) provides emergency and protective services to the borough. The WPD consists of 20 sworn officers, as well as special officers and crossing guards, and is headed by a Chief of Police. The WPD responds to approximately 13,000 calls per year.

=== Fire / EMS ===
The Wallington Fire Department (WFD) is an all-volunteer fire department. The WFD was organized in October 1894 and consists of three fire companies operating out of three firehouses. The department is staffed by 85 fully trained firefighters. The Wallington Fire Department Emergency Squad provides emergency medical and rescue services.

== Transportation ==
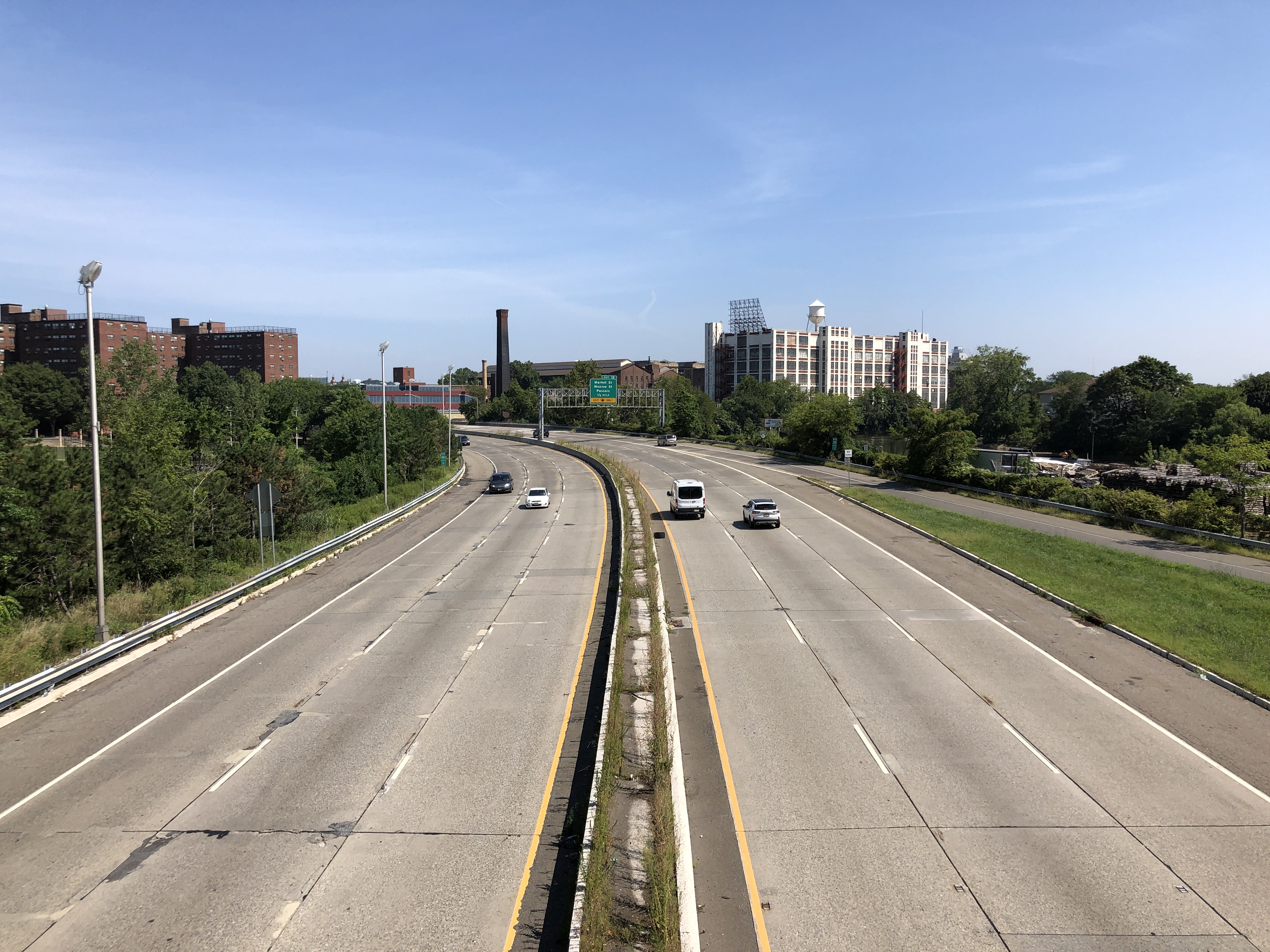
Route 21 briefly passes through Wallington

=== Roads and highways ===
As of May 2010, the borough had a total of 18.93 miles (30.46 km) of roadways, of which 16.07 miles (25.86 km) were maintained by the municipality and 2.86 miles (4.60 km) by Bergen County.

A very short section of New Jersey Route 21 passes through Wallington. This section was built over a section of the Passaic River which was filled in to allow the highway to be constructed. However, the municipal boundary still follows the old river bed, resulting in a small section of Wallington on the west bank of the river which is mostly occupied by the highway.

County Route 507 is the most significant road directly serving Wallington. Three bridges, the Gregory Avenue Bridge (built in 1905), the Market Street Bridge (dating back to 1894) and the Eighth Street Bridge (originally constructed in 1915) cross the Passaic River from Wallington to the city of Passaic. After years of construction, a new 290-foot (88 m) Eighth Street Bridge was completed in 2019 with the assistance of $15 million in aid from the federal government, restoring service to a crossing that had handled more than 6,000 vehicles per day on a bridge that was more than 100 years old.

The New Jersey Turnpike Western Roadway (Interstate 95) is accessible at Exit 16W in neighboring East Rutherford.

=== Public transportation ===
NJ Transit's Bergen County Line passes through, but does not stop in, Wallington. Wesmont station is located along the border between Wallington and Wood-Ridge, but it can only be accessed from the latter. NJ Transit bus routes 160 and 161 provide service to and from the Port Authority Bus Terminal in Midtown Manhattan, and routes 703, 707, and 780 provide local service.

== Notable people ==
People who were born in, residents of, or otherwise closely associated with Wallington include:

- Elizabeth Calabrese, member of the Bergen County Board of Chosen Freeholders from 2004 to 2010
- George Fischbeck (1922–2015), television weatherman
- Steve Hamas (1907–1974), professional football player in the National Football League who turned to professional boxing, defeating former heavyweight champions Tommy Loughran and Max Schmelling
- Henry Helstoski (1925–1999), U.S. Congressman from 1965 to 1977, representing New Jersey's 8th congressional district
- Ralph Kirchenheiter (born c. 1939 or 1940), former head football coach and athletic director for Muhlenberg College
- Doris Mahalick (1924–2008), politician who served on the Bergen County Board of Chosen Freeholders, Mayor of Wallington and as the nation's first woman to serve as a county police commissioner
- Frankie Perez (born 1989), mixed martial artist who has competed in Ultimate Fighting Championship
- Ed Sanicki (1923–1998), outfielder for the Philadelphia Phillies
- Walling Van Winkle (1650–1725), namesake of Wallington who built a home here
- Nick Zielonka (born 2002), professional soccer player who plays as a forward for New York Cosmos in the USL League One

== Sources ==
- Municipal Incorporations of the State of New Jersey (according to Counties) prepared by the Division of Local Government, Department of the Treasury (New Jersey); December 1, 1958.
- Clayton, W. Woodford; and Nelson, William. History of Bergen and Passaic Counties, New Jersey, with Biographical Sketches of Many of its Pioneers and Prominent Men., Philadelphia: Everts and Peck, 1882.
- Harvey, Cornelius Burnham (ed.), Genealogical History of Hudson and Bergen Counties, New Jersey. New York: New Jersey Genealogical Publishing Co., 1900.
- Van Valen, James M. History of Bergen County, New Jersey. New York: New Jersey Publishing and Engraving Co., 1900.
- Westervelt, Frances A. (Frances Augusta), 1858–1942, History of Bergen County, New Jersey, 1630–1923, Lewis Historical Publishing Company, 1923.
