= Peter Shapiro (financier) =

American politician (1952–2024)

1st Essex County Executive
- In office 1979–1987
- Succeeded by: Nicholas R. Amato

Member of the New Jersey General Assembly from the 28th district
- In office January 1, 1976 – January 9, 1979 Serving with Patrick J. Scanlon (1976–1977); Joseph Papasidero (1977–1978); Mary Scanlon (1978–1979)
- Preceded by: Rocco Neri; Philip M. Keegan
- Succeeded by: Remay Pearce

Personal details
- Born: April 18, 1952 Newark, New Jersey, U.S.
- Died: March 2024 (aged 71) South Orange, New Jersey, U.S.
- Party: Democratic
- Spouse: Bryna Linett (m. 1982)
- Children: 1
- Education: Columbia High School
- Alma mater: Harvard University (AB)

Peter Ian Shapiro (April 18, 1952 – March 28 or 29, 2024) was an American Democratic Party politician and financier from New Jersey. As a young reformer in South Orange, he opposed the dominant political machine to become the youngest person ever elected to the New Jersey General Assembly in 1975 and served as the Essex County Executive from 1979 to 1987. In 1985, he was the Democratic nominee for governor of New Jersey against incumbent Thomas Kean but was defeated in a historical landslide.

After leaving politics, Shapiro served as a senior executive in the financial sector and on the board of directors of the New Israel Fund,

== Early years ==
Peter Ian Shapiro was born on April 18, 1952 in Newark, New Jersey. His parents, Myron and Henrietta Shapiro, were immigrants from Canada. He grew up in Orange, Millburn, and then South Orange, attending Columbia High School in Maplewood. During high school, Shapiro was suspended for leading a protest against the Vietnam War but was reinstated after the New Jersey chapter of the American Civil Liberties Union intervened. He attended Harvard College, where he was managing editor of The Harvard Crimson and received his A.B. degree cum laude in economics and history in 1974.

== Political career ==
=== New Jersey General Assembly ===
After college, Shapiro returned to Essex County and quickly launched a political career after briefly working for New Jersey Commissioner of Transportation Alan Sagner in Brendan Byrne's administration. In 1975, he ran for the New Jersey General Assembly without the support of the local political machine, which was led by longtime chairman Harry Lerner. As a young unknown without party support, he ran a methodical door-to-door campaign in targeted election districts and had Robert F. Kennedy, Jr., a friend from college, accompany him on election eve. He defeated the incumbent organization candidate, Rocco Neri, in the primary by a margin of 183 votes out of 8,530 cast. At 23, he was the youngest person ever elected to the Assembly.

Shapiro served two terms in the Assembly from 1976 to 1979, chairing the Housing Committee and serving as vice chairman of the Appropriations Committee.

=== Essex County Executive ===
In 1978, Shapiro helped push through reform to the Essex County charter creating the position of county executive. Shapiro ran for the new office, defeating the Lerner machine again. Four years later, he was reelected with 69 percent of the vote. During his tenure as county executive, he worked for administrative reform, reorganizing 69 agencies under 8 principal departments.

As county executive, Shapiro became active in state and national Democratic politics. He supported Ted Kennedy, uncle of his college friend Robert F. Kennedy, Jr., in the 1980 Democratic presidential primaries. He considered running for United States Senate in 1982 but ultimately declined to challenge the popular Republican representative Millicent Fenwick; Fenwick lost the election to Frank Lautenberg. He supported Walter Mondale in the 1984 Democratic presidential primaries.

=== 1985 gubernatorial campaign ===
In 1985, at the age of 33, Shapiro announced that he would run for governor of New Jersey against the popular Republican incumbent Thomas Kean. He styled his campaign on the model of Gary Hart's 1984 presidential run. Some observers also compared his candidacy to Robert Redford's character in the 1972 film The Candidate, especially when Shapiro's campaign commercials used the Redford character's slogan, A Better Way.

Shapiro won the Democratic primary with 31 percent of the vote over New Jersey Senate majority leader John F. Russo and Newark mayor Kenneth A. Gibson.

In the general election campaign, Shapiro ran well behind Kean in polling, and Kean ultimately won in a record landslide, carrying 71 percent of the overall vote, all of New Jersey's 21 counties, and nearly every municipality. Kean won the largest margin in a gubernatorial election in New Jersey history. The only municipalities Shapiro carried were the small boroughs of Audubon Park and Chesilhurst in Camden County and Roosevelt in Monmouth County.

In 1986, Shapiro lost his reelection bid for Essex County Executive to Republican Nicholas R. Amato by a margin of 12,000 votes. Shapiro had been weakened by a falling out with Raymond M. Durkin, who chaired both the New Jersey Democratic State Committee and the Essex County Democratic committee.

== Business career ==
Shapiro moved into the private sector, spending six years at Citibank, where he served as a senior banker and headed the municipal derivatives business and public finance department. He then served as senior vice president of Euro Brokers, a leading derivative specialist, for five years. In 1997 he founded Swap Financial Group, an independent advisor and arranger of interest rate derivatives. He retired from Swap Financial Group in 2019.

== Personal life and death ==
Shapiro married teacher Bryna Linett in 1982; they had one son.

Shapiro had lung disease at the end of his life, and died from respiratory failure at his home in South Orange, New Jersey, in March 2024 the age of 71. The New York Times reported he died on March 28, while the New Jersey Globe and a funeral home notice gave his date of death as March 29.

New Jersey General Assembly
Preceded by Rocco Neri	Member from 28th district 1976–1979	Succeeded by Remay Pearce
Political offices
Preceded by Position created	County Executive Essex County, New Jersey; 1979–1987	Succeeded by Nicholas R. Amato
Party political offices
Preceded by James Florio	Democratic Nominee for Governor of New Jersey; 1985	Succeeded by James Florio
