= Mercer County Executive =

County Executive of Mercer County
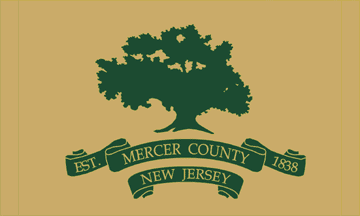
- Incumbent; Daniel J. Benson since 2024
- Term length: Four years; renewable
- Inaugural holder: Arthur Sypek Sr.
- Formation: 1976
- Website: County Executive

The County Executive of Mercer County, New Jersey, United States is the chief officer of the county's executive branch. The executive oversees the administration of county government and works in conjunction with Board of County Commissioners, which acts in a legislative role. The New Jersey Superior Court had subsumed and replaced county courts in 1983. The office of the County Executive is in the county seat and state capital, Trenton.

As of the 2020 United States census, Mercer was the state's 12th-most-populous county, with a population of 387,340.

The County Executive is elected directly by the voters to a term of four years with no term limits. The incumbent, Daniel R. Benson was sworn into office January 2, 2024 after being elected in November 2023.

== History ==
In 1972, the State of New Jersey passed the Optional County Charter Law, which provides for four different manners in which a county could be governed: by an executive, an administrator, a board president, or county supervisor. Mercer County voters in a 1974 referendum voted to establish the executive office.

A court case between Mercer County's Executive and the Board of Chosen Freeholders in which the New Jersey Superior Court Law Division clarified interpretation as to the rights and responsibilities of the two branches of government was decided in 2001.

Mercer is one of the five of 21 counties of New Jersey with a popularly-elected county executive, the others being Atlantic, Bergen, Essex, and Hudson.

=== Elections ===
Year	Democrat	Votes	%	Republican	Votes	%
1975	Arthur Sypek Sr.	46,280	53.92%	S. Harry Sayen	39,558	46.08%
1979	Arthur Sypek Sr.			Bill Mathesius		
1983	Joe Tighue			Bill Mathesius		
1987	Joe Bocchini	39,940	49.55%	Bill Mathesius	40,664	50.45%
1991	Joe Bocchini			Bob Prunetti		
1995	Jim McManimon			Bob Prunetti		
1999	Jim McManimon	35,877	47.74%	Bob Prunetti	39,271	52.26%
2003	Brian M. Hughes	34,956	49.02%	Cathy DiCostanzo	33,283	46.67%
2007	Brian M. Hughes	43,453	63.03%	Janice Mitchell Mintz	25,493	36.98%
2011	Brian M. Hughes	42,086	65.01%	Jonathan Savage	22,661	34.99%
2015	Brian M. Hughes	33,793	67.14%	Lisa Richford	16,500	32.78%
2019	Brian M. Hughes	46,439	69.59%	Lishian Wu	20,245	30.34%
2023	Daniel R. Benson	48,257	69.84%	Lisa Marie Richford	20,835	30.16%

== County executives ==
=== Arthur Sypek Sr. (1976–80) ===
Democrat Arthur Sypek Sr. (1917–2002) was the inaugural officeholder of the county executive. A resident of Lawrence Township, he had served in the U.S. Army during World War II, a real estate and insurance agent, member of the Lawrence Township Planning Board, and a Mercer County Freeholder for 16 years.

In the 1975, Sypek defeated then-Trenton mayor Art Holland in the Democratic primary and S. Harry Sayen, the Mercer County Republican chairman, in the general election. Sypek was defeated for re-election by Bill Mathesius in 1979 and died on April 23, 2002.

=== Bill Mathesius (1980–92) ===
Republican Wilbur H. "Bill" Mathesius, from Hopewell Township, served three terms from 1980 to 1991. He was referred as "Wild Bill" during a political career that included stints as Assistant United States Attorney and county prosecutor.

Mathesius was appointed to the New Jersey Superior Court in 2002 and was briefly suspended in 2006 for comments regarding the death penalty. In 2008, Governor Jon Corzine declined to reappoint him. He last presided over a murder trial in which there were irregularities.

=== Bob Prunetti (1992–2004) ===
Republican Robert "Bob" Prunetti, served as executive from 1992 to 2004. During his tenure Prunetti sued the Board of Chosen Freeholders in a case which led to a court interpretation as to the rights and responsibilities of the two branches of government.

As county chief, he collaborated with the City of Trenton to develop what became known as the Sun National Bank Center.

In 2012, Prunetti was appointed by then-Governor Chris Christie to the Trenton's Capital City Redevelopment Corporation He later become Chief of the MIDJersey Chamber of Commerce.

=== Brian M. Hughes (2004–24) ===
Democrat Brian M. Hughes was first elected in November 2003. He was re-elected in 2007, 2011, 2015, and 2019.

Hughes is a graduate of Thomas Edison State College and resident of Princeton. He is a member of the notable Hughes-Murphy political family. His father was two-term New Jersey Governor and New Jersey Supreme Court Chief Justice Richard J. Hughes. His brother, John Hughes, is a serving federal magistrate. His half-brother, Michael Murphy, is an influential lobbyist, former county prosecutor, and 1997 candidate for governor. His sister-in-law is a Superior Court judge.

Hughes previously served as Deputy Executive Director of the Governor's Council on Alcoholism and Drug Abuse. In 1992 he made an unsuccessful bid to represent New Jersey's 4th congressional district in Congress. In 1997, was elected to the Board of Chosen Freeholders and served two terms, including one as Freeholder President. In 2014, he was elected the first Vice President of the County Executives of America (CEA).

=== Daniel R. Benson (2024–) ===
Democrat Daniel R. Benson is a life-long resident of Hamilton. He was elected in November 2023, after Hughes dropped his re-election bid earlier that year after Benson defeated him at the Mercer County Democratic Convention.

== See also ==
- Atlantic County Executive
- Bergen County Executive
- Essex County Executive
- Hudson County Executive
