= Essex County Executive =

County Executive of Essex County
- Incumbent; Joseph N. DiVincenzo Jr. since January 2003
- Term length: Four years; renewable
- Inaugural holder: Peter Shapiro
- Formation: 1986
- Website: http://essexcountynj.org/essex-county-executive/

The County Executive of Essex County in the U.S. state of New Jersey, is the chief officer of the county's executive branch and oversees the administration of county government. Approved in a 1977 referendum, the office was inaugurated in 1978 at the same time the Board of Chosen Freeholders, which plays a legislative role, was reconfigured to include a mix of at-large and district seats. The executive offices are located at the Essex County Government Complex in the county seat, Newark. When the first executive was elected in 1978, The New York Times described that the position was "considered by many to be second in power only to that of the Governor".

The executive has power to appoint a County Administrator as well as department heads, subject to the approval of the Board of County Commissioners. Responsibilities include preparation/submission of operating and capital budgets, introduction of legislation, the hiring and dismissal of personnel, and approval or veto of Freeholder ordinances. The Board of County Commissioners have the power to investigate administrative actions of the executive, approve ordinances and resolutions, initiate service contracts with municipalities, and adopt an administrative code.

The executive is directly elected to a four-year term on a partisan basis. Since the first county executive took office, five individuals have served in the position, alternating between Democrats and Republicans. Incumbent Democrat Joseph N. DiVincenzo Jr. was first elected county executive in 2002.

As of Election Day 2017 there were 491,941 registered voters in the county, the third-most of any county in the state which in 2016 had estimated an estimated population of 786,914, the third-largest county in New Jersey by population.

Essex is one of five counties in New Jersey with a county executive, the others being Atlantic, Bergen, Hudson and Mercer.

== History ==
In 1972, the State of New Jersey passed the Optional County Charter Law, which provides for four different methods under which a county could be governed: by an executive, an administrator, a board president or a county supervisor.

A Charter Study Commission was formed in 1974 and was the only one of nine counties to consider changes that rejected the path of modifying the structure of county government. The six Democrats on the Charter Study Commission supported the status quo while the three Republicans were in favor of the proposed changes; The commission' s report concluded that "It is the recommendation of the Commission that none of the options is suitable for adoption by the County of Essex..."

In September 1975, a group called "Vote Yes", with support from the county's bipartisan conference of mayors and the non-partisan League of Women Voters submitted to the County Clerk petitions with nearly 62,000 signatures asking that a strong County Executive position be created, together with changes to the structure of the nine-member board of chosen freeholders in which four seats would be elected at-large and five from equal-sized districts; the signatures collected exceeded the minimum threshold of nearly 57,000 signatures necessary to put the measure on the ballot, representing 15% of the 378,000 voters registered in the county. Despite the Democratic Party's longstanding control of the existing freeholder board, it was "good government Democrats" who had gathered the greatest number of signatures. After the County Clerk verified the signatures submitted by the renamed Citizens for Charter Change in Essex County, it was determined that the group was 8,500 signatures short of the minimum, as only 48,200 of the names on petitions could be verified against voter registration rolls. A three-judge panel gave the charter-change supporters an extension to gather the necessary petitions in enough time to have ballots printed, which never came to fruition.

A second initiative was begun by the bi-partisan Citizens for Charter Change in Essex County to get a referendum to modify Essex County government on the ballot, in the face of opposition from the establishment Democrats who had been in control of county government since 1969. In a June 1977 court ruling, it was determined that there were a sufficient number of signatures collected to get the initiative on the ballot. The chairman of the county Democratic Party vowed to "fight like hell" in opposition to the charter change, which he described as "a form of dictatorship", while the leader of a group opposed to the change, led by a freeholder not running for re-election, was against what he saw as the "establishment of an autonomous governmental czar who could reign unchecked over Essex County for four years".

The second referendum was held in November 1977 and the proposal to create an executive branch was passed by the voters 72,226 to 64,238. The change also modified the structure of the legislative branch, board of chosen freeholders, eliminating the position of county supervisor and changing the structure of the nine-member, at-large board of chosen freeholders so that four would remain at-large, while five would be elected from equal-sized districts. The first executive, Peter Shapiro, was elected in November 1978, and took office together on November 13 of that year, one week after election day, together with the nine newly elected freeholders.

== County executives ==
=== Peter Shapiro: 1978–1985 ===
Peter Shapiro had been the youngest person elected to serve in the New Jersey General Assembly, and was one of the people who helped push through the change in the Essex County charter in 1977 creating the position of county executive. Shapiro ran for the new office, defeating Sheriff John F. Cryan, the candidate of the well-entrenched Democratic organization led by county chairman Harry Lerner in the primary, before knocking off Republican Robert F. Notte in the first general election for the post in November 1978. He took office, with the nine newly elected members of the restructured freeholder board, one week after election day, on November 13, 1978. Shapiro was reelected with 69% of the vote in the 1982 general election, defeating Republican James Troiano. During his tenure as county executive, he worked for administrative reform, reorganizing 69 agencies under 8 principal departments, leaving office as executive to run for Governor of New Jersey, unsuccessfully.

=== Nicholas Amato: 1987–1991 ===
Democrat-turned-Republican Nicholas R. Amato, who had resigned as the Essex County Surrogate to run for office, was elected in 1986, knocking off Shapiro, who was running for his third term of office. Amato was able to capitalize on voter frustration with 22% increases in county tax rates, and the division within the Democratic Party following Shapiro's overwhelming loss in the 1985 race for governor, to Republican Thomas Kean, by the largest margin of victory ever recorded for any gubernatorial race in New Jersey, 71%–24%. When Amato switched his registration back to the Democratic Party, he was unable to get official primary support in the primary, and did not seek re-election in 1990.

=== Thomas D'Allesio: 1991–1995 ===
Democrat Thomas D'Allesio was elected in 1990, having defeated Republican Michael Vernotico of Millburn. D'Allesio resigned from office in 1994 following his conviction on federal extortion charges.

=== James Treffinger: 1995–2003 ===
Republican James W. Treffinger was elected in 1994, defeating Mayor Cardell Cooper, Democrat of East Orange. The Democrats had faced challenges, since Cooper and Thomas Giblin wound up tied with 22,907 votes in the June primary, after three official recounts. A series of court battles ended that August, with Cooper selected as the general election candidate, two months after the primary.

Treffinger was re-elected to his second term as executive in 1998, defeating former Newark mayor Kenneth A. Gibson by 50-47%.

After two failed bids for United States Senate in 2000 and 2002, as well as facing federal corruption charges, Treffinger chose not seek re-election as executive in 2002.

=== Joe DiVincenzo: 2003–present ===
After 11 years as a freeholder, Democrat Joseph N. DiVincenzo Jr. was elected to his first term as executive in 2002, defeating Republican Candy Straight with more than 70% of the vote.

DiVincenzo was re-elected in 2006 with 121,490 votes (76.4% of the total), ahead of Republican Joseph Chiusolo with 32,728 (20.7%), as well as independent candidates Donald Page 3,346 (2.0%), and George M. Tillman 1,349 (0.84%). He defeated Herbert Glenn in 2010 to win his third term in office, making him the longest-serving executive in county history. In 2010, DiVincenzo received 113,457 votes (75.1% of ballots cast), ahead of Glenn with 32,885 (21.8%) and Independent Marilynn M. English with 4,529 (3.0%). He won his fourth term in 2014 with a victory against Peter Tanella of Cedar Grove, by a margin of 95,574 to 28,683, taking 76.7% of the vote, to 23.0% for Tanella.

DiVincenzo announced in December 2017 that he would be running for his fifth term of office. He won the 2018 election with 80% of votes cast. He won the 2022 election by a similar margin against Republican Adam Kraemer of West Orange.

== See also ==
- Politics of Essex County, New Jersey
- Atlantic County Executive
- Bergen County Executive
- Hudson County Executive
- Mercer County Executive
