= New Jersey Democratic State Committee =

New Jersey affiliate of the Democratic Party

Democratic Party of New Jersey
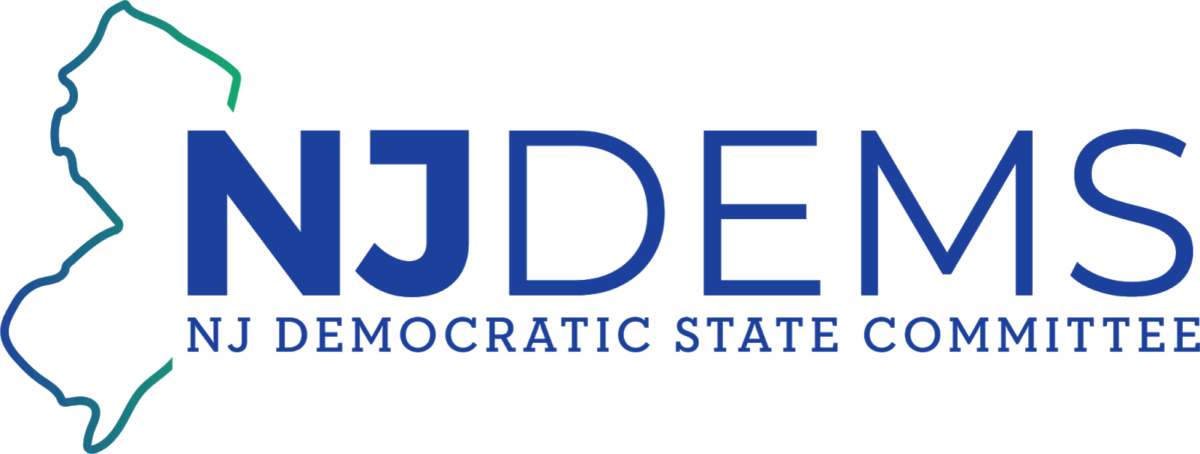
- Chairperson: LeRoy J. Jones Jr.
- Headquarters: 194-196 West State Street Trenton, New Jersey
- Membership (2025): ▼2,535,498
- National affiliation: Democratic Party
- Colors: Blue
- United States Senate: 2 / 2
- United States House of Representatives: 9 / 12
- New Jersey Senate: 25 / 40
- New Jersey General Assembly: 57 / 80

Election symbol

Website
- www.njdems.org

The New Jersey Democratic State Committee (NJDSC) is the affiliate of the Democratic Party in the U.S. state of New Jersey. LeRoy J. Jones Jr. is the chair and Peg Schaffer is the vice chair. Its main rival is the New Jersey Republican Party.

It is currently the dominant party in the state, controlling every statewide office, including both of the state's U.S. Senate seats and the governorship, as well as 9 out of 12 U.S. House seats and both chambers of the state legislature.

== Structure ==
The NJDSC has a 13-member executive committee. The party also has a county chair for each of the state's 21 counties.

== Current elected officials ==
The New Jersey Democratic Party holds a majority in the New Jersey Senate and the New Jersey General Assembly. The party also holds both U.S. Senate seats, 7 of the state's 12 U.S. House seats, and the governor's and lieutenant governor's offices.

=== Members of Congress ===
==== U.S. Senate ====
Democrats have controlled both of New Jersey's seats in the U.S. Senate since 2013:

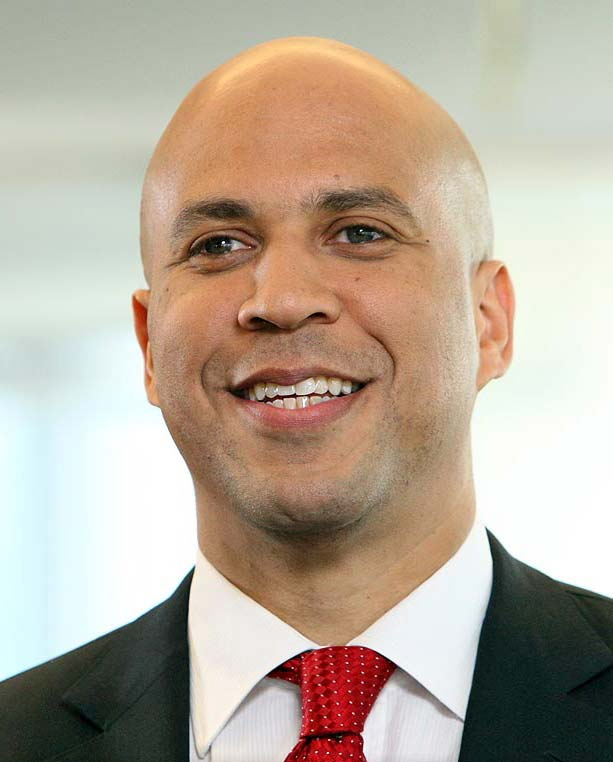
Senior U.S. Senator Cory Booker

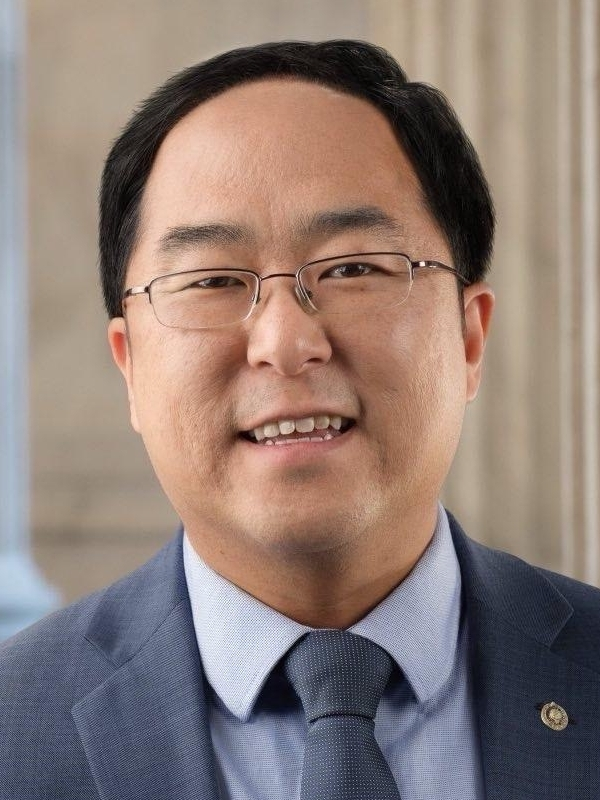
Junior U.S. Senator Andy Kim

==== U.S. House of Representatives ====
Out of the 12 seats New Jersey is apportioned in the U.S. House of Representatives, 9 are held by Democrats:

District	Member	Photo
1st	Donald Norcross	
2nd	Zack Mullock (elect)	
3rd	Herb Conaway	
5th	Josh Gottheimer	
6th	Frank Pallone	
7th	Rebecca Bennett (elect)	
8th	Rob Menendez	
9th	Nellie Pou	
10th	LaMonica McIver	
11th	Analilia Mejia	
12th	Bonnie Watson Coleman	
12th	Adam Hamawy (elect)	

=== Statewide officials ===
Democrats hold the New Jersey governorship and the lieutenant governorship.

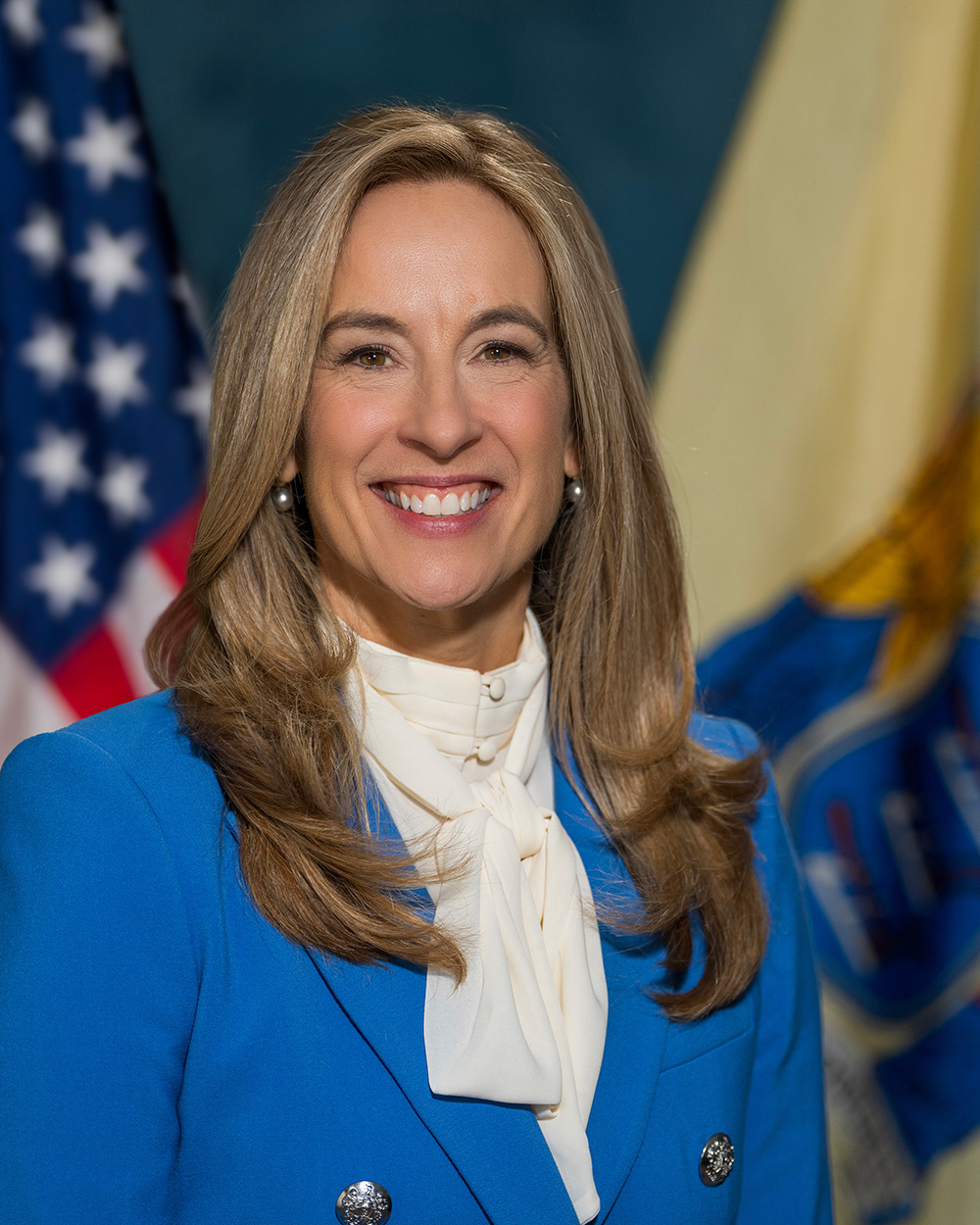
Governor Mikie Sherrill

Lieutenant Governor/Secretary of State Shirley Emehelu

=== State legislative leaders ===
- President of the Senate: Nicholas Scutari
  - Majority Leader: Teresa Ruiz
  - President Pro Tempore: Shirley Turner
  - Deputy Majority Leader: Paul Sarlo
- Speaker of the Assembly: Craig Coughlin
  - Majority Leader: Louis Greenwald
  - Speaker Pro Tempore: Annette Quijano

=== State representatives ===
==== New Jersey Senate ====
District	Name	Residence	First served
District 3	John Burzichelli	Paulsboro	2024
District 4	Paul D. Moriarty	Washington Township (Gloucester)	2024
District 5	Nilsa Cruz-Perez	Barrington	2014
District 6	James Beach	Voorhees Township	2009
District 7	Troy Singleton	Palmyra	2018
District 11	Vin Gopal	Long Branch	2018
District 14	Linda R. Greenstein	Plainsboro Township	2010
District 15	Shirley Turner	Lawrence Township (Mercer)	1998
District 16	Andrew Zwicker	South Brunswick	2022
District 17	Bob Smith	Piscataway	2002
District 18	Patrick J. Diegnan	South Plainfield	2016
District 19	Joe Vitale	Woodbridge Township	1998
District 20	Joseph Cryan	Union Township (Union)	2018
District 22	Nicholas Scutari	Linden	2004
District 27	John F. McKeon	West Orange	2024
District 28	Renee Burgess	Irvington	1986
District 29	Teresa Ruiz	Newark	2008
District 31	Angela V. McKnight	Jersey City	2024
District 32	Raj Mukherji	Jersey City	2024
District 33	Brian P. Stack	Union City	2008
District 34	Britnee Timberlake	East Orange	2024
District 35	Benjie Wimberly	Paterson	2015
District 36	Paul Sarlo	Wood-Ridge	2003
District 37	Gordon M. Johnson	Englewood	2022
District 38	Joseph Lagana	Paramus	2018

==== New Jersey Assembly ====
District	Name	Residence	First served
District 4	Dan Hutchison	Gloucester Township	2024
District 4	Cody Miller	Monroe Township	2024
District 5	William F. Moen Jr.	Runnemede	2020
District 5	William Spearman	Camden	2018
District 6	Louis Greenwald	Voorhees Township	1996
District 6	Melinda Kane	Cherry Hill	2025
District 7	Balvir Singh	Burlington Township	2025
District 7	Carol A. Murphy	Mount Laurel	2018
District 8	Andrea Katz	Chesterfield Township	2024
District 14	Daniel R. Benson	Hamilton Township (Mercer)	2011
District 14	Wayne DeAngelo	Hamilton Township (Mercer)	2008
District 15	Verlina Reynolds-Jackson	Trenton	2018
District 15	Anthony Verrelli	Hopewell Township (Mercer)	2018
District 16	Roy Freiman	Hillsborough Township	2018
District 16	Sadaf Jaffer	Montgomery Township	2022
District 17	Joseph Danielsen	Franklin Township (Somerset)	2014
District 17	Joseph V. Egan	New Brunswick	2002
District 18	Robert Karabinchak	Edison	2016
District 18	Nancy Pinkin	East Brunswick	2014
District 19	Craig Coughlin	Woodbridge Township	2010
District 19	Yvonne Lopez	Perth Amboy	2018
District 20	Reginald Atkins	Roselle	2022
District 20	Annette Quijano	Elizabeth	2008
District 22	Linda Carter	Plainfield	2018
District 22	James J. Kennedy	Rahway	2016
District 27	Mila Jasey	South Orange	2007
District 27	John F. McKeon	West Orange	2002
District 28	Jackie Yustein	Glen Ridge	2008
District 28	Cleopatra Tucker	Newark	2008
District 29	Eliana Pintor Marin	Newark	2013
District 29	Shanique Speight	Newark	2018
District 30	Avi Schnall	Lakewood Township	2024
District 31	William Sampson	Bayonne	2022
District 31	Angela V. McKnight	Jersey City	2016
District 32	Angelica M. Jimenez	West New York	2012
District 32	Pedro Mejia	Secaucus	2018
District 33	Annette Chaparro	Hoboken	2016
District 33	Raj Mukherji	Jersey City	2014
District 34	Thomas P. Giblin	Montclair	2006
District 34	Britnee Timberlake	East Orange	2018
District 35	Shavonda E. Sumter	Paterson	2012
District 35	Al Abdelaziz	Paterson	2025
District 36	Clinton Calabrese	Cliffside Park	2018
District 36	Gary Schaer	Passaic	2006
District 37	Shama Haider	Tenafly	2022
District 37	Ellen Park	Englewood Cliffs	2022
District 38	Lisa Swain	Fair Lawn	2018
District 38	Chris Tully	Bergenfield	2018

=== Mayors ===
- Newark: Ras Baraka (1)
- Jersey City: Steven Fulop (2)
- Paterson: Andre Sayegh (3)
- Elizabeth: J. Christian Bollwage (4)
- Woodbridge Township: John McCormac
- Union City: Brian P. Stack

== List of chairmen and chairwomen ==
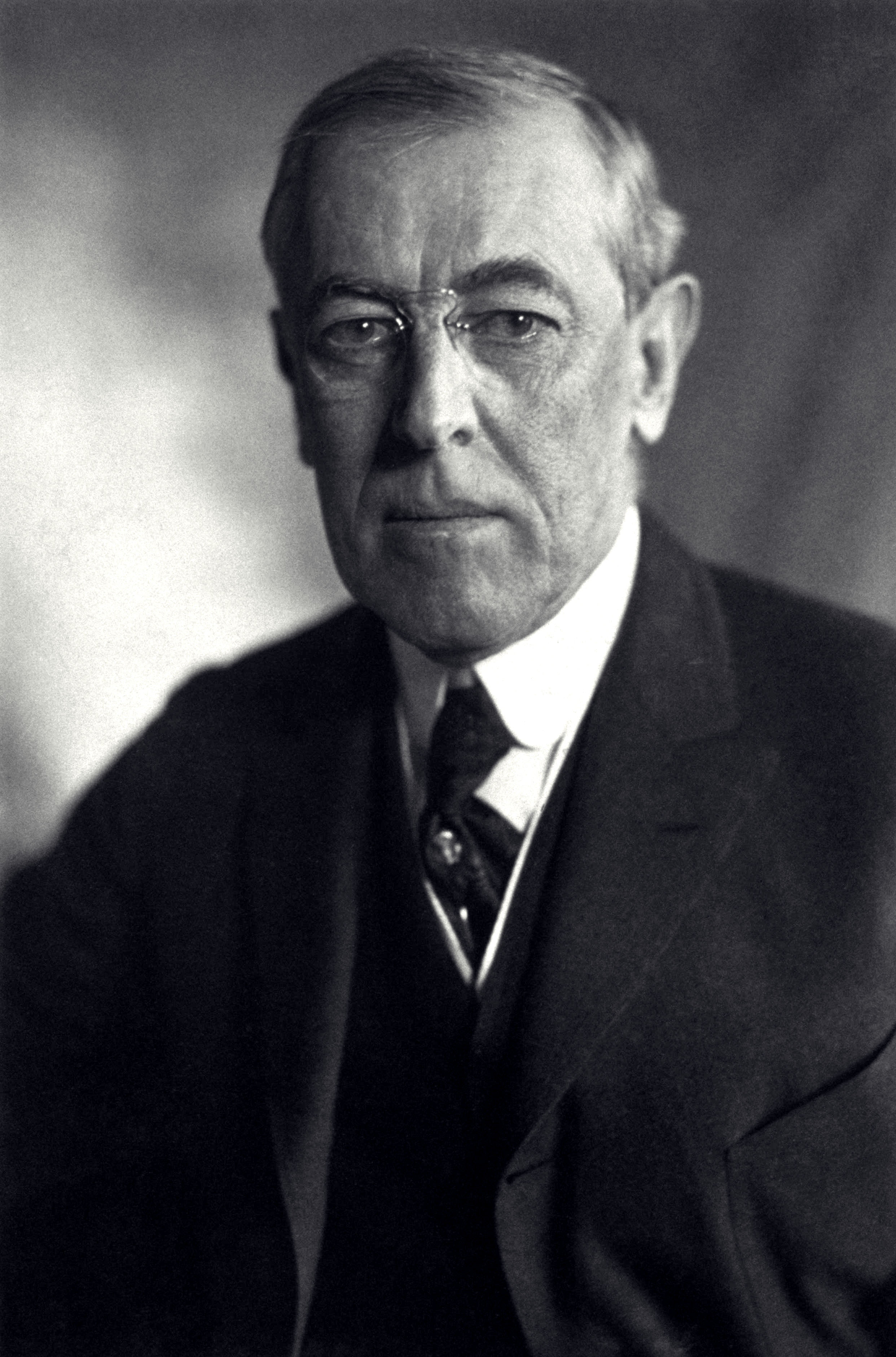
Woodrow Wilson, 28th President of the United States (1913–1921)

- James R. Nugent (1908–1911)
- Edward Everett Grosscup (1911–1919)
- Charles F. McDonald (1919–1922)
- Harry Heher (1922–1932)
- Mary Teresa Norton (1932–1935)
- William H. Kelly (1935–1938)
- David Theodore Wilentz (1938)
- Crawford Jamieson (1939)
- Mary Teresa Norton (1940–1944)
- Edward J. Hart (1944–1953)
- Charles R. Howell (1953–1954)
- George E. Brunner (1954–1961)
- Thorn Lord (1961–1965)
- Robert J. Burkhardt (1965–1969)
- Salvatore A. Bontempo (1969–1973)
- James P. Dugan (1973–1977)
- Richard J. Coffee (1977–1981)
- James F. Maloney (1981–1985)
- Raymond M. Durkin (1985–1990)
- Philip M. Keegan (1990–1992)
- Raymond Lesniak (1992–1994)
- Tom Byrne (1994–1997)
- Thomas P. Giblin (1997–2001)
- Joseph J. Roberts (2001–2002)
- Bonnie Watson Coleman (2002–2006)
- Joseph Cryan (2006–2010)
- John Wisniewski (2010–2013)
- John Currie (2013–2021)
- LeRoy J. Jones, Jr. (2021–present)

== Election results ==
=== Federal ===
==== U.S. House ====
Election	Votes	%	Seats (NJ)	±	%
2016	1,821,620	54.16	7 / 12	▲1	3.97
2018	1,856,819	59.52	11 / 12	▲4	5.76
2020	2,539,128	57.28	10 / 12	0	2.64
2022	1,416,422	54.27	9 / 12	▼1	3.01
2024	2,115,843	52.41	9 / 12	0	1.86
2026	1,902,260	65.09	11 / 12	▲2	12.6

=== State ===
==== Executive offices ====
Governor
Election	Candidate	Votes	%	Result
1973	Brendan Byrne	1,414,613	66.67%	Won ✓
1977	Brendan Byrne	1,184,564	55.71%	Won ✓
1981	James Florio	1,144,202	49.38%	Lost ✗
1985	Peter Shapiro	578,402	29.32%	Lost ✗
1989	James Florio	1,379,937	61.23%	Won ✓
1993	James Florio	1,210,031	48.29%	Lost ✗
1997	Jim McGreevey	1,107,968	45.82%	Lost ✗
2001	Jim McGreevey	1,256,853	56.43%	Won ✓
2005	Jon Corzine	1,224,551	53.47%	Won ✓
2009	Jon Corzine/Loretta Weinberg	1,087,731	44.88%	Lost ✗
2013	Barbara Buono/Milly Silva	809,978	38.19%	Lost ✗
2017	Phil Murphy/Sheila Oliver	1,203,110	56.03%	Won ✓
2021	Phil Murphy/Sheila Oliver	1,339,471	51.22%	Won ✓
2025	Mikie Sherrill/Dale Caldwell	1,896,610	56.88%	Won ✓
