= Joseph N. DiVincenzo Jr. =

American politician

Joe DiVincenzo

Essex County Executive
- Incumbent
- Assumed office January 2003
- Preceded by: James W. Treffinger

Personal details
- Born: May 17, 1952 (age 73) Newark, New Jersey, U.S.
- Political party: Democratic
- Education: New Jersey City University (BA)

Joseph N. DiVincenzo Jr. (born May 17, 1952), widely known as Joe D., has been the County Executive of Essex County, New Jersey since 2003.

== Background and career ==
DiVincenzo attended Jersey City State College. where he played football for the Knights graduating in 1976 with a degree in public health.

DiVincenzo was first elected to the Essex County Board of Chosen Freeholders in 1990. He served as the board's president for eight terms. Prior to becoming freeholder, DiVincenzo held public jobs in Essex County as a parks supervisor, teacher, and athletics coordinator.

== County Executive ==
DiVincenzo was sworn in to his first term as County Executive of Essex County on January 1, 2003 after being elected in 2002; he was reelected for his fourth term in November 2014. He received the backing of the state's Democratic establishment, including Bob Menendez, Cory Booker, Stephen Sweeney, Vincent Prieto, Donald Payne Jr., and Steve Fulop. DiVincenzo announced in December 2017 that he would be running for his fifth term of office. He won the 2018 election with 80% of votes cast against West Orange's Adam Kraemer.

=== Double dipping ===
Double dipping is the practice of simultaneously holding multiple elected positions or to being employed by and collecting retirement benefits from the same public authority at the same time.

In 2011, DiVincenzo while still in office began to collect pension as County Executive. He justified the move by claiming that it is legal, as well as a good financial decision for his family.

=== Statewide influence ===
DiVincenzo is generally considered to be a power broker and political boss of the Essex County political machine, exerting much influence on county and state politics. In 2011 in The New York Times, New Jersey State Senator Kevin O'Toole (R-Cedar Grove) is quoted as saying that "in terms of Democratic politics, Joe D. is becoming the king of North Jersey."

Crossing party lines, he, and many other registered Democrats statewide, endorsed Republican Governor Chris Christie in his successful 2013 re-election bid.

In 2021, he endorsed Governor Phil Murphy in his successful re-election bid.

== Campaign spending violations investigation ==
In October 2013, questions arose regarding DiVincenzo's campaign spending. The state Election Law Enforcement Commission (ELEC), in its 16-count complaint against DiVincenzo, alleged that he failed to properly report nearly $72,000 in campaign expenditures, and improperly spent more than $16,000. In May 2014, the commission announced it would not hold hearings until after the election, tentatively in January 2015. It is unclear whether the ELEC will hear the case. The four-person board, required by law to include two Democrats and two Republicans, has been without a Democratic member since Governor Christie has not appointed one. One Democrat, Walter Timpone, recused himself without explanation, leading to Divincenzo's lawyers' claims that there must be an official quorum. The case is unlikely to proceed. Governor Christie chose not to replace the Democrat, effectively crippling the ELEC.

== Personal life ==
After residing for 34 years in Nutley, he moved with his wife Donna to Roseland in 2013. He has two children, Kimberly DiVincenzo-Root and Joseph DiVincenzo.

Political offices
Preceded by James W. Treffinger	Essex County Executive; 2003–present	Incumbent
