= Raymond M. Durkin =

Chairman of the New Jersey Democratic State Committee
- In office 1985–1990

Chairman of the Essex County Democratic Committee
- In office 1980–1992
- Succeeded by: Thomas D'Alessio

Personal details
- Born: Raymond M. Durkin; 1936 Newark, New Jersey, U.S.
- Died: 23-12-2014 Livingston, New Jersey, U.S.
- Party: Democratic
- Spouse: Joan Codey Durkin
- Children: 5, including Christopher J. Durkin
- Education: Seton Hall University
- Occupation: Politician, Firefighter

Raymond M. "Ray" Durkin (1936 – December 23, 2014) was an American Democratic party politician from New Jersey who has served as chairman of the New Jersey Democratic State Committee as well as the Essex County Democratic Committee.

Durkin grew up in the Vailsburg neighborhood in the West Ward of Newark, New Jersey. He was a member of the Newark Fire Department for 17 years, before becoming secretary to the county purchasing agent under former Essex County Democratic Chairman Harry Lerner. He became purchasing agent after Peter Shapiro defeated Lerner's organization to become Essex County's first elected executive in 1978. Durkin was an early active supporter of Shapiro.

Durkin was selected as Essex County Democratic Chairman in 1980. In 1985, when Shapiro was the Democratic candidate for Governor of New Jersey opposing incumbent Tom Kean, Durkin was named chairman of the New Jersey Democratic State Committee. Durkin helped Jim Florio win the Democratic nomination for governor in 1989 and also assisted Ron Brown in his election as chairman of the Democratic National Committee that same year.

Durkin served as state party chairman until 1990. He continued as Essex County party chairman until 1992, when he was unseated by County Executive Thomas D'Alessio. (D'Alessio was convicted of extortion in 1994.)

After his loss of the Essex party chairmanship, Durkin dropped out of politics. He spent a month in a rehabilitation program in Minnesota for alcohol abuse. On January 3, 1997 he was arrested outside the Hudson Plaza Motel in Bayonne, New Jersey with one vial of crack cocaine. He was charged with being under the influence, possession of cocaine, and possession of drug paraphernalia. He entered a plea of not guilty but made arrangements to enter a substance abuse program.

Durkin resided in Maplewood, New Jersey. His wife, Joan Codey Durkin, is a first cousin of former New Jersey Governor Richard Codey and has served as Essex County Tax Commissioner. His son Christopher J. Durkin has served as Essex County Clerk since 2006. Durkin died on December 23, 2014, at the age of 78, from emphysema and heart failure at a hospital in Livingston, New Jersey.

Party political offices
| Preceded by James F. Maloney | Chairman of the New Jersey Democratic State Committee; 1985 – 1990 | Succeeded by Philip M. Keegan |
