= Hudson County Executive =

County Executive of Hudson County
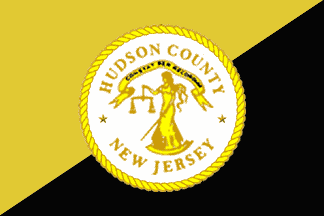
- Incumbent; Craig Guy since January 2024
- Term length: Four years; renewable
- Inaugural holder: Edward F. Clark Jr.
- Formation: 1972
- Salary: $180,530 (per 2022)

The County Executive of Hudson County, New Jersey, United States is the chief officer of the county's executive branch, which oversees the administration of county government, and works in conjunction with the nine-member Board of County Commissioners (formerly known as the Board of Chosen Freeholders), which acts in a legislative role. The office of the county executive is in the Hudson County Courthouse in the county seat, Jersey City.

The county executive is elected directly by the voters to a term of four years, which begins on January 1. There have been four elected and one appointed county executives since the establishment of the office in 1977, which replaced the county supervisor. Thomas A. DeGise, who took office in 2002 and was re-elected five times, retired at the end of his term on December 31, 2023. His chief of staff, Craig Guy, assumed the position following the 2023 general election, in which 18% of the 403,729 registered voters in Hudson County cast ballots.

== History ==
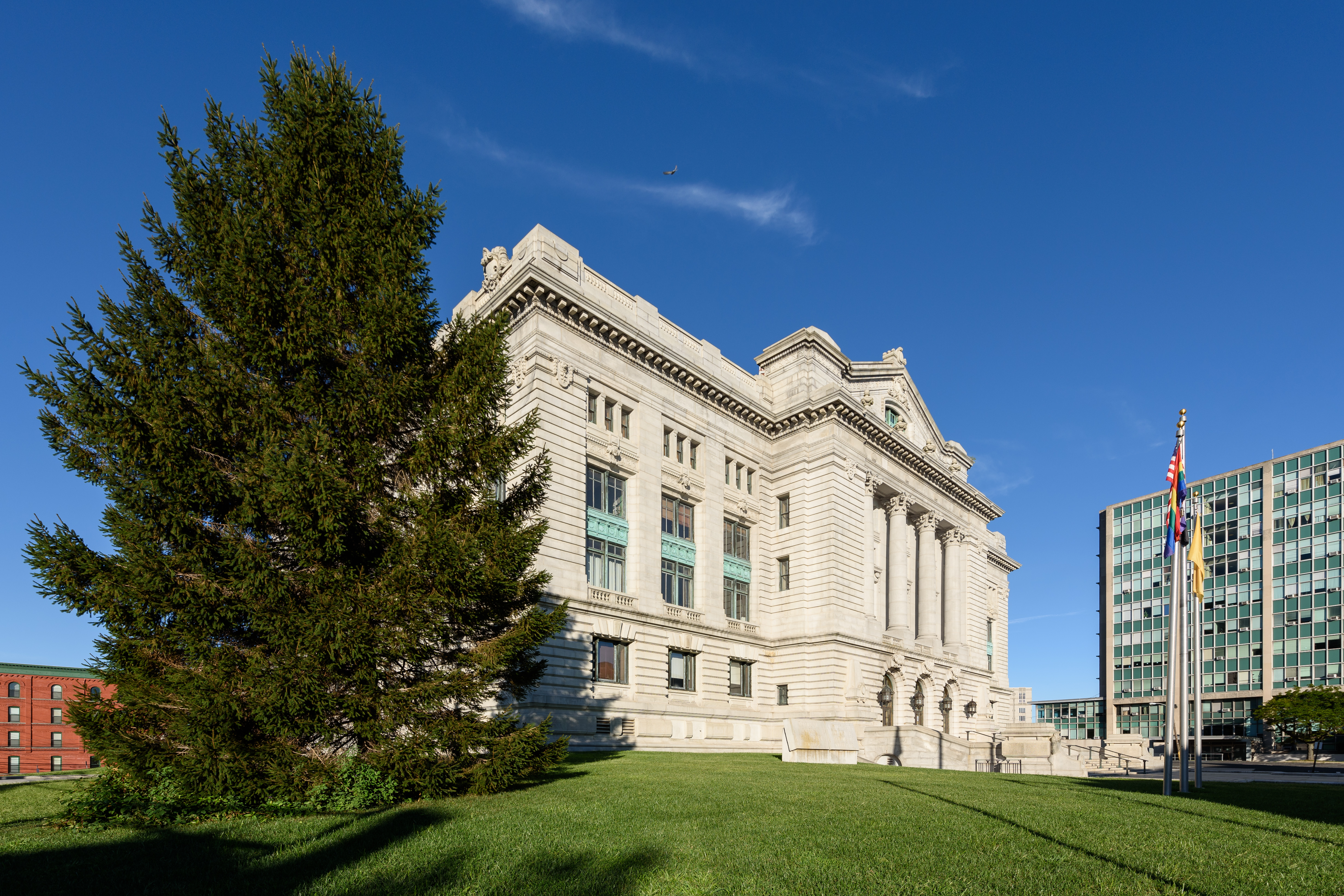
Hudson County Courthouse and Administration Building

Prior the creation of the office of executive, the Board of Chosen Freeholders chose a Director from among themselves.

In 1972, New Jersey passed the Optional County Charter Law, which provides for four different manners in which a county could be governed: by an executive, an administrator, a board president or a county supervisor. Hudson is one of five New Jersey counties with a popularly-elected county executive, the others being Atlantic, Bergen, Essex, and Mercer.

There have been four elected and one appointed county executives since the establishment of the office in 1977, which replaced the county supervisor.

== County executives ==
=== Edward F. Clark Jr. (1975–87) ===
Edward F. Clark Jr. (born Bayonne - d. December 3, 2011 Monmouth Beach) was elected after the form of county government was changed, becoming the county's first county executive in 1977.

Clark was the son of Edward F. Clark Sr., who was once Mayor of Bayonne. He was graduate of George Washington University, Clark served in the Navy during World War II.

Clark served as Hudson County Freeholder from 1962 to 1970. He was director of the board from 1970 to 1972 and county supervisor from 1972 to 1975. After 12 years in the post, he was defeated in a Democratic primary for the office in 1987.

=== Robert Janiszewski (1988–2001) ===
Robert C. Janiszewski (b. September 18, 1945 in Jersey City) was elected County Executive in 1987 after having won the Democratic primary against incumbent Edward F. Clark Jr.

He attended St. Joseph's School in Jersey City and St. Michael's High School in Union City. He graduated Jersey City State College with a B.A. degree in 1967 and an M.A. degree in sociology in 1975. He taught social sciences at Westwood High School and Hudson County Community College.

In 1977, Janiszewski was elected to the New Jersey General Assembly, serving from 1978 to 1984. He also served as a commissioner of the Port Authority of New York and New Jersey and chairman of the North Jersey Transportation Planning Authority. He entered the race for the Democratic gubernatorial primary in 1997 but withdrew before the election.

On September 6, 2001, Janiszewski resigned from his position as county executive due to corruption charges. He would later be sentenced to 41 months in prison for tax evasion and accepting more than $100,000 in bribes.

=== Bernard M. Hartnett Jr. (2001–02; interim) ===
Bernard M. Hartnett Jr., is a lawyer and former executive at New Jersey Bell. He was the former Hudson County Democratic chairman when appointed by county Democratic leaders as interim county executive on October 14, 2001, after the resignation of Janiszewski.

Hartnett was a pro-reform candidate. He had been considered for as an interim Mayor of Jersey City after the seat became vacant February 7, 1992, when Gerald McCann was removed from office after his conviction on fraud charges.

=== Thomas DeGise (2002–23) ===
Democrat Thomas DeGise was born, raised, and lives in Jersey City. He earned his bachelor's degree in Political Science from Saint Peter's College in 1973. He worked as teacher and administrator in the Jersey City Public Schools from 1975, and served as a job placement counselor at Henry Snyder High School before retiring.

DeGise entered public life as a community leader during the 1980s, founding the New #28 School Neighborhood Association and eventually chairing the Heights Coalition of Neighborhood Associations (HCNA) in the Heights section of Jersey City. DeGise was Jersey City's longest-serving Municipal Council President, holding that office from 1993 to 2001. In 2001, DeGise ran for Mayor of Jersey City in an election won by Glenn Cunningham.

Following the resignation of Janiszewski in September 2001, DeGise took office as county executive after winning a special election in November 2002 with 77 percent of the vote. On his first day in office, he submitted legislation to the Board of Chosen Freeholders to create the first-ever Ethics Oversight Board for the Hudson County government. He was re-elected in 2003, 2007 and 2011 2015. DeGise served as the Chairman of the North Jersey Transportation Planning Authority for a two-year term that ended in January 2016.

He sought re-election in 2019 and won with 83% of the vote. for a term which ended December 31, 2023, after which he retired.

=== Craig Guy (2024–) ===
As of 2024, Hudson County's Executive is Craig Guy (D, Jersey City), whose term of office expires December 31, 2027. Guy won the June 2023 primary with about 75% of the vote and was unopposed in the November general election.

== See also ==
- Atlantic County Executive
- Bergen County Executive
- Essex County Executive
- Mercer County Executive
- Borough president
