= Elizabeth Calabrese =

American Democratic Party politician

Elizabeth Calabrese is an American Democratic Party politician, who has served on the Bergen County Board of Chosen Freeholders in New Jersey from 2004 to 2010. On January 2, 2007, Calabrese was chosen to serve as freeholder vice-chairman. In 2010, her constituents voted her out of office when the Republicans regained the majority on the Bergen County freeholder board.

She has served as chairwoman of the education committee as well as chairwoman to the Special Services School Board of Estimate. Calabrese is a member of the Cultural and Historic Affairs, Organization and Internal Affairs, and Personnel Committees.

Calabrese has served as a councilwoman in Wallington, New Jersey since 2000, where she worked as the first chairwoman of the Recreation Committee, as well as chairwoman of the Welfare & Aging Committee. She also serves on the DPW Committee as well as the Health, Environment and Senior Services Committee. She is currently chairperson of Public Buildings and Grounds.

Calabrese and her family immigrated to the United States during the 1956 Hungarian Revolution. Calabrese and her husband Charles have been residents of Wallington for 28 years. They have three daughters: Lauren, Christina, and Julianna.
