= Doris Mahalick =

American politician

Doris Meyer Mahalick (October 23, 1924 – October 17, 2008) was an American Democratic Party official who served on the Bergen County, New Jersey Board of Chosen Freeholders. She served as the mayor of Wallington, New Jersey and as the first woman to serve as the Bergen County Police Commissioner when she was appointed in 1965.

She was elected Freeholder in 1975, and was re-elected in 1978, 1981 and 1984. She lost a bid for the New Jersey General Assembly in 1967. In 1986, she sought the Democratic nomination for Bergen County Executive after voters changed the form of government; party leaders instead picked State Senator Matthew Feldman as their candidate. She declined to seek re-election as Freeholder, and in the general election she endorsed Feldman's Republican opponent, William D. McDowell. After McDowell won, Mahalick joined his administration.

She retired to Wildwood Crest, New Jersey and Palm Beach, Florida, and died in 2008 at age 83 after battles with Alzheimer's and Parkinson's diseases.
