= 1985 New Jersey gubernatorial election =

- November 5, 1985
- Turnout: 52% (▼12pp)
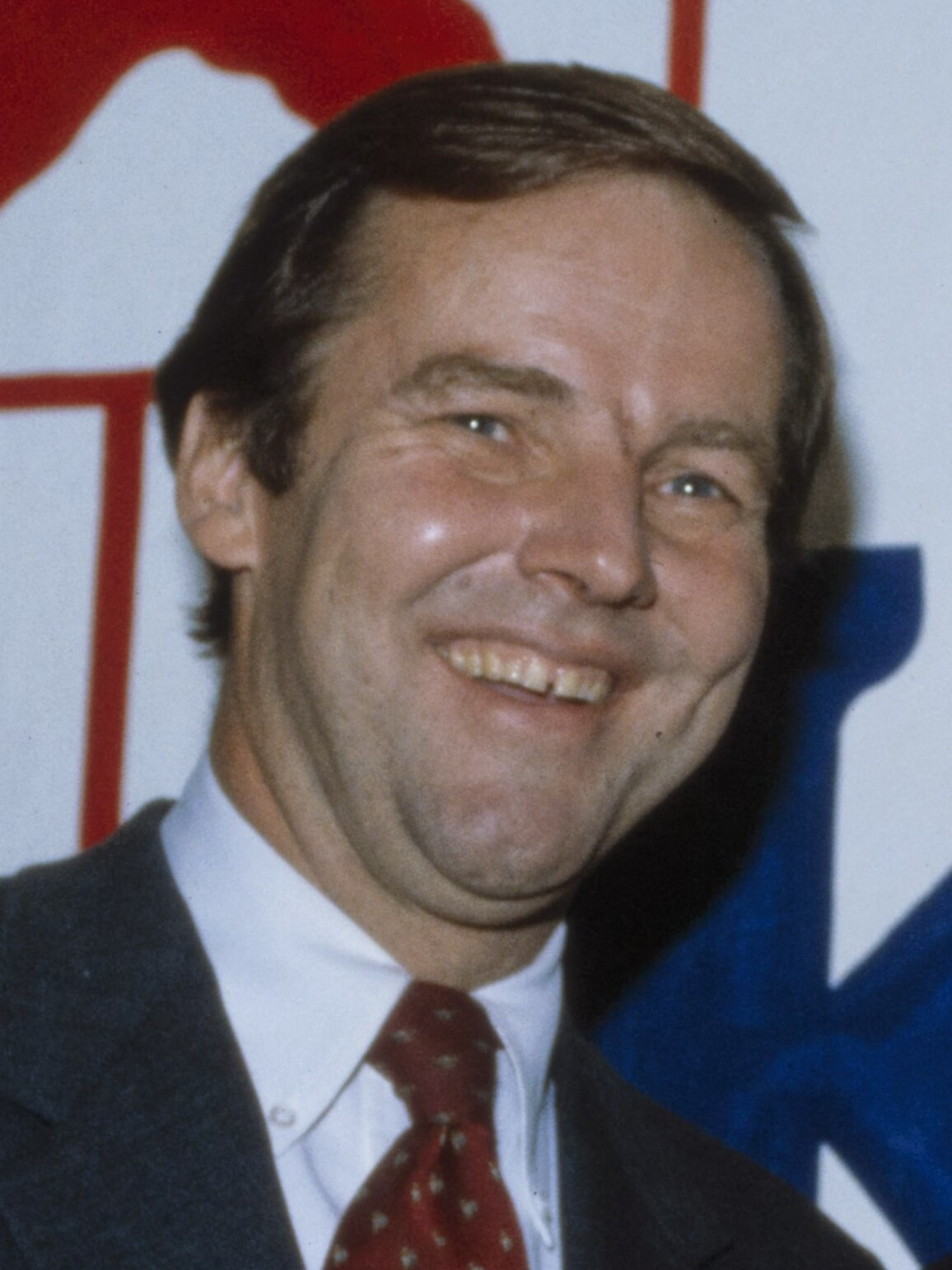

Nominee	Thomas Kean	Peter Shapiro
Party	Republican	Democratic
Popular vote	1,372,631	578,402
Percentage	69.58%	29.32%
- Kean: 50–60% 60–70% 70–80%
Governor before election
Thomas Kean
Republican
Elected Governor
Thomas Kean
Republican

The 1985 New Jersey gubernatorial election was held on November 5, 1985. Incumbent Republican Governor Thomas Kean won a landslide re-election against the Democratic candidate, Essex County Executive Peter Shapiro. Until 2025, Kean had the largest margin in raw votes, but still holds the record for the largest percentage margin and largest vote share in all New Jersey gubernatorial elections to date. Kean was the first Republican to be re-elected governor since 1949, and the first Republican to ever win two four-year terms.

Primary elections were held on June 4. Kean was unopposed for the Republican nomination. In the Democratic primary, Shapiro prevailed over strong competition from Senate President John F. Russo and Newark mayor Kenneth A. Gibson. Stephen B. Wiley and Robert Del Tufo ran competitive campaigns but finished well behind the top three.

The general election was a foregone conclusion in favor of the popular incumbent. Kean won 564 out of 567 municipalities (all except Audubon Park, Chesilhurst, and Roosevelt) and a 62% majority among African-American voters, a remarkable margin for a modern Republican candidate. Kean's coattails led the Republicans to win the General Assembly for the first time since the 1971 elections. To date, Kean is the last Republican to win Essex and Hudson counties in a statewide election and the last candidate of any party to carry every county. Until 2021, this was the last election where the winning candidate was of the same party as the sitting president.

== Republican primary ==
=== Candidates ===
- Thomas Kean, incumbent governor since 1982

=== Campaign finance ===
Primary campaign finance activity
Candidate	Spent
Tom Kean	$1,144,244
Source: New Jersey Election Law Enforcement Commission

=== Results ===
Incumbent Governor Thomas Kean was unopposed in the Republican primary election.

Republican primary results
Party	Candidate	Votes	%
Republican	Thomas Kean (incumbent)	151,259	100.00
Total votes		151,259	100.00

== Democratic primary ==
=== Candidates ===
- Robert Del Tufo, former U.S. attorney for the District of New Jersey
- Kenneth A. Gibson, mayor of Newark
- Elliot Greenspan, president of the New Jersey chapter of the National Democratic Policy Committee
- John F. Russo, state senator from Toms River and Senate majority leader
- Peter Shapiro, Essex County executive and former assemblyman
- Stephen B. Wiley, former state senator from Morris Township

==== Declined ====
- James Florio, U.S. Representative from Camden and nominee for Governor in 1981

=== Campaign finance ===
Primary campaign finance activity
Candidate	Spent
Peter Shapiro	$1,161,161
John Russo	$1,134,504
Stephen B. Wiley	$1,058,851
Kenneth Gibson	$987,835
Robert Del Tufo	$737,094
Elliot Greenspan	$600
Source: New Jersey Election Law Enforcement Commission

=== Results ===
Democratic Party primary results
Party	Candidate	Votes	%
Democratic	Peter Shapiro	101,243	31.02
Democratic	John F. Russo	86,827	26.60
Democratic	Kenneth A. Gibson	85,293	26.13
Democratic	Stephen B. Wiley	27,914	8.55
Democratic	Robert Del Tufo	19,742	6.05
Democratic	Elliot Greenspan	5,834	1.65
Total votes		326,403	100.00

== General election ==
=== Candidates ===
- George M. Fishman, retired social studies teacher (Communist)
- Virginia Flynn, word processor and Universal Life Church minister (Libertarian)
- Rodger Headrick, real estate salesman (The True Light)
- Julius Levin, apartment manager (Socialist Labor)
- Thomas Kean, incumbent Governor since 1982 (Republican)
- Mark Satinoff, sheet metal worker (Socialist Workers)
- Peter Shapiro, Essex County Executive and former Assemblyman (Democratic)

=== Campaign ===
Kean was riding on high popularity ratings from voters on account of the good economic situation of the state in the 1980s including a surplus in the state budget.

His efforts to aid depressed cities through Urban Enterprise Zones and reaching out to groups not typically associated with the Republicans including African Americans and labor unions led to endorsements from black ministers, Coretta Scott King, the AFL–CIO, and The New York Times.

Shapiro ran on a platform of reducing car insurance rates, the state's high property taxes, and improvement of the environment but his struggles of fundraising due to New Jersey being located in two expensive media markets (New York City and Philadelphia) and Kean's momentum left his campaign little-received.

=== Polling ===
Poll source	Date(s) administered	Sample size	Margin of error	Peter Shapiro (D)	Tom Kean (R)	Undecided
Star-Ledger/Eagleton	August 15–25, 1985	586 RV	±4.1%	13%	68%	19%
Star-Ledger/Eagleton	Sept. 29–Oct. 8, 1985	982 LV	±3.2%	16%	67%	17%

=== Campaign finance ===
General election campaign finance activity
Candidate	Spent
Tom Kean	$2,254,971
Peter Shapiro	$1,980,213
Source: New Jersey Election Law Enforcement Commission

=== Results ===
New Jersey Gubernatorial Election, 1985
Party	Candidate	Votes	%	±%
Republican	Thomas Kean (incumbent)	1,372,631	69.58%	▲20.12
Democratic	Peter Shapiro	578,402	29.32%	▼20.06
Independent	Rodger Headrick	8,537	0.43%	N/A
Libertarian	Virginia Flynn	4,710	0.24%	▲0.14
Socialist Workers	Mark Satinoff	3,703	0.19%	▲0.12
Socialist Labor	Julius Levin	2,740	0.14%	▲0.05
Communist	George M. Fishman	1,901	0.10%	N/A
Majority		794,402	40.26%	
Turnout		1,972,624		
Republican hold		Swing		

==== By county ====
County	Kean %	Kean #	Shapiro %	Shapiro vo##	Other %	Other #
Atlantic	69.1%	38,477	29.8%	16,611	1.1%	608
Bergen	71.5%	181,238	27.8%	70,525	0.6%	1,554
Burlington	68.7%	56,573	30.5%	25,078	0.9%	696
Camden	60.9%	70,374	38.1%	43,960	0.9%	1,173
Cape May	74.7%	23,331	24.5%	7,665	0.8%	239
Cumberland	66.4%	21,017	31.8%	10,065	1.8%	570
Essex	66.9%	121,685	31.2%	56,694	1.8%	3,383
Gloucester	63.6%	35,424	35.3%	19,662	1.2%	640
Hudson	65.1%	88,165	34.1%	46,195	0.8%	1,160
Hunterdon	75.4%	17,875	22.7%	5,388	1.9%	453
Mercer	63.2%	53,562	35.6%	30,212	1.2%	994
Middlesex	65.8%	113,020	33.1%	56,815	1.0%	1,804
Monmouth	72.9%	109,238	26.4%	39,529	0.7%	1,084
Morris	78.4%	85,189	21.0%	22,847	0.4%	566
Ocean	73.7%	90,670	25.1%	30,948	1.2%	1,455
Passaic	69.8%	70,896	28.8%	29,263	1.4%	1,429
Salem	64.9%	12,376	33.7%	6,417	1.4%	270
Somerset	75.6%	44,502	23.1%	13,601	1.3%	761
Sussex	77.7%	22,109	21.1%	5,998	1.2%	346
Union	73.3%	102,411	25.1%	35,060	1.5%	2,187
Warren	70.4%	14,499	28.5%	5,869	1.0%	219

Counties that flipped from Democratic to Republican

- Burlington
- Camden
- Cumberland
- Essex
- Gloucester
- Hudson
- Mercer
- Middlesex
- Salem
