= Nicholas R. Amato =

American politician

2nd Essex County Executive
- In office 1987–1991
- Preceded by: Peter Shapiro
- Succeeded by: Thomas D'Allesio

Essex County Surrogate
- In office 1971–1987
- Preceded by: Thomas R. Farley

Personal details
- Born: September 1, 1940 (age 84)
- Political party: Democratic (before 1986); Republican (after 1986)

Nicholas Raymond Amato (born September 1, 1940) is an American politician who served as Essex County Executive from 1987 to 1991. He was the executive director of the New Jersey Casino Reinvestment Development Authority and later served as the president of the Casino Association of New Jersey. By 2008 he was the general counsel of Resorts International.

== Biography ==
He was born on September 1, 1940.

He was elected Essex County Surrogate as a Democrat in 1971, defeating Republican incumbent Thomas R. Farley, and was re-elected in 1976 and 1981.

In 1986, Amato was dumped from the Essex County Democratic organization line by the incumbent County Executive, Peter Shapiro. In 1986 Amato switched parties and became the Republican candidate for Surrogate. After the primary, Amato switched to the Essex County Executive race and ran against Shapiro. He won by over 12,000 votes.

He was elected as the Essex County, New Jersey Executive in 1987 and he worked to block payments of around $500,000 that were to awarded as bonuses to the outgoing aides of former executive Peter Shapiro. Once in office Amato dismissed five section chiefs from the Essex County Counsel's office. The dismissed employees filed a lawsuit declaring that they were illegally fired. They asked the court for reinstatement, back pay, accrued vacation time, and the payment of a year-end bonus of around $3,000.

He appointed Robert J. Jackson to the Essex County Department of Public Works. In 1989 as Essex County, New Jersey Executive, and as part of a bipartisan team of Essex County legislators he introduced "model legislation that would pool rental security deposits to create funds at below-market rates for building low-income housing ... The proposed legislation would establish a tenant-landlord bank for the millions of dollars in rental security deposits held on apartments throughout Essex County."

In 1991 he became the executive director of the New Jersey Casino Reinvestment Development Authority. By 1995 he was serving as the President of the Casino Association of New Jersey where he lobbied to keep the Atlantic City Line, which runs from Philadelphia, running.

In 2008 he resigned as general counsel of Resorts International.
