= Atlantic County Executive =

Head of Atlantic County, New Jersey's executive branch

County Executive of Atlantic County
- Incumbent; Dennis Levinson since January 2000
- Term length: Four years; renewable
- Inaugural holder: Charles D. Worthington
- Formation: 1974
- Salary: $141,930 (2017)
- Website: www.atlantic-county.org/county-executive/

The County Executive of Atlantic County, New Jersey, United States, is the chief officer of the county's executive branch and manages the county business, including implementing policy, administering county services, and directing the executive staff. Executives have overseen the administration of county government since the county adopted the form in 1974. The executive offices are located in Atlantic City.

The executive is elected to a four-year term. Since its first county executive took office in 1975, three individuals have served as the county executive, two of whom have been elected to five or more consecutive terms of office.

As of 2026, Atlantic County's executive is Republican Dennis Levinson, who was sworn into office for his seventh term in January 2024.

== History ==
Starting in 1967, the county had been governed by a seven-member Board of Chosen Freeholders, all elected at large, having been reduced from a maximum of 35 members reached in 1966 under a form in which a freeholder represented each municipality. Under the pre-1967 system, each municipality had freeholders, but in a manner that gave disproportionate representation to smaller municipalities. Corbin City's 238 residents had two representatives, while Atlantic City, with over 60,000 residents, had four freeholders.

In 1972, the state passed the Optional County Charter Law, which provided for four different manners in which a county could be governed, including by an executive, an administrator, a board president or a county supervisor.

The county established a Charter Study Commission in 1973, recommending the ultimately accepted changes. In November 1974, Atlantic County voters changed the county governmental form under the Optional County Charter Law to the county executive form. The charter provided for an executive directly by the voters and a nine-member Board of County Commissioners, responsible for legislation. The executive is elected to a four-year term, and the commissioners are elected to staggered three-year terms, of which four are elected from the county on an at-large basis, and five commissioners represent equally populated districts.

Atlantic County joins Bergen, Essex, Hudson, and Mercer counties as one of the five of 21 New Jersey counties with an elected executive.

== County executives ==
=== Charles D. Worthington: 1975–1979 ===
Democrat Charles D. Worthington, the first county executive, took office in 1975 while serving his only term in the New Jersey General Assembly. The incoming freeholder board was dominated by Republicans, who held a 7-2 majority, flipping the 5-2 majority that Democrats had held on the freeholder board in place under the previous form of government.

=== Dick Squires: 1980–1999 ===
Richard "Dick" Squires was born in 1932 in Atlantic City and was raised in Egg Harbor Township.

A former Freeholder, Republican Squires defeated Worthington in the 1979 general election. Squires served in office as county executive for 20 years until deciding in 1999 that he would not run for re-election. Squires won re-election in 1987, defeating Democrat Mary Haynie in an election focused on plans for the expansion of Atlantic City International Airport.

=== Dennis Levinson: 2000–present ===
Republican Dennis Levinson was raised in Ventnor City and graduated from Atlantic City High School before earning a bachelor's degree at Glassboro State College (now Rowan University). He taught history for three decades at the Northfield Community Schools.

Before his election to the Board of Freeholders, he served as a Councilmember in Northfield from 1982 to 1986. First elected as a freeholder in an upset over Joe Messick, Levinson was chosen by his peers as Freeholder Chairman six times.

Levinson was first elected Atlantic County Executive in 1999, winning 53% of the vote and spending $111,000 to defeat Democrat Tom Foley. He was re-elected in 2003 with 83% of the vote and no Republican opposition. In 2007, Levinson won with 65% of the vote, defeating Sheriff Jim McGeittigan, a Republican who changed parties to run for election. In 2011, Levinson again won reelection with two-thirds of the vote, defeating Democrat Clifton Sudler, who had never previously run for elective office. In 2015, Democratic challenger Jim Schroeder dropped out of the race in September, weeks before the election, citing health concerns. Schroeder's name stayed on the ballot, and Levinson won with 63% of the vote, from 28,431 to 16,542.

== See also ==
- Bergen County Executive
- Essex County Executive
- Hudson County Executive
- Mercer County Executive
