= Ed Sanicki =

American baseball player (1923–1998)

- Outfielder
- Born: July 7, 1923; Wallington, New Jersey, U.S.
- Died: July 6, 1998 (aged 74); Old Bridge Township, New Jersey, U.S.
- Batted: Right Threw: Right

MLB debut
- September 14, 1949, for the Philadelphia Phillies

Last MLB appearance
- May 12, 1951, for the Philadelphia Phillies

MLB statistics
- Batting average: .294
- Home runs: 3
- Runs batted in: 8
- Stats at Baseball Reference

Teams
- Philadelphia Phillies (1949, 1951)

Edward Robert "Butch" Sanicki (July 7, 1923 – July 6, 1998) was an American professional baseball player. An outfielder, he appeared in 20 Major League games for the 1949 and 1951 Philadelphia Phillies. Born in Wallington, New Jersey, he attended Clifton High School, and threw and batted right-handed; he stood 5 feet 9 inches (1.75 m) tall and weighed 175 pounds (79 kg).

Sanicki signed with the Phillies after serving in the U.S. Navy in World War II. On September 14, 1949 — in his first at-bat in the Major Leagues — he hit a three-run home run off Rip Sewell of the Pittsburgh Pirates. In 1950, during spring training, he injured his knee. Although he made the Phils in 1951, his final major-league game was on May 12. During his two MLB trials, Sanicki registered only 17 at bats — but of his five hits, three were home runs and one was a double.

After leaving baseball in 1952, Sanicki graduated from Seton Hall University and became a special-education teacher in New Jersey.

He died on July 6, 1998, in Old Bridge Township, New Jersey, and is buried at Holy Cross Burial Park in East Brunswick.

== See also ==
- Home run in first Major League at-bat
