= Bergen County Executive =

County Executive of Bergen County
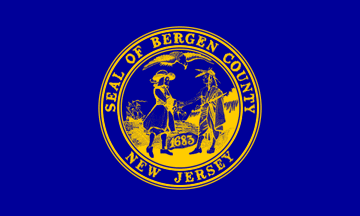

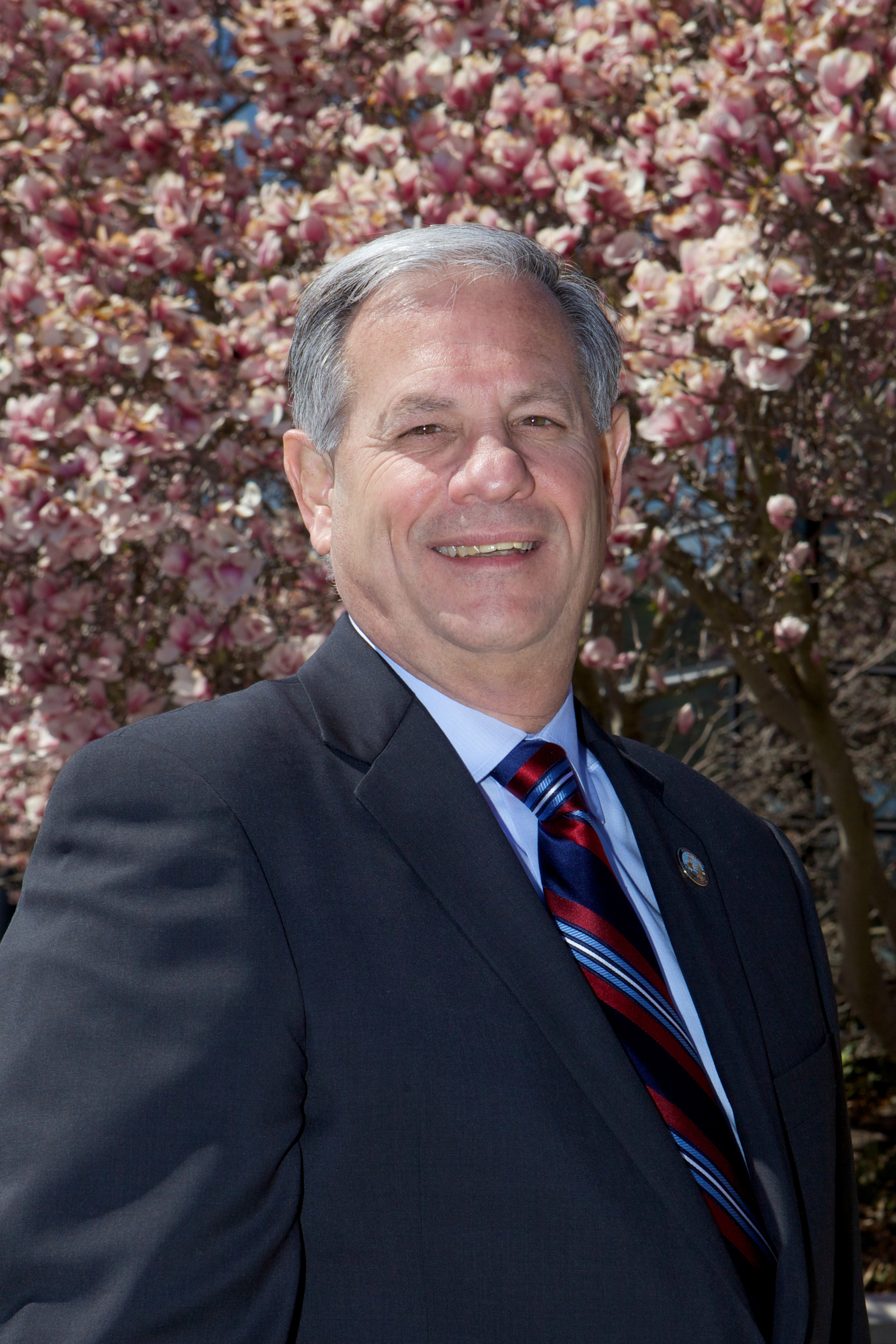
- Incumbent; Jim Tedesco since January 2015
- Term length: Four years; renewable
- Inaugural holder: William D. McDowell
- Formation: 1986
- Website: http://www.co.bergen.nj.us/461/Bergen-County-Executive

The Bergen County Executive is county executive of Bergen County, New Jersey, United States who, as the chief officer of the county's executive branch, oversees the administration of county government. The office was inaugurated in 1986 at the same time the Board of Chosen Freeholders, which plays a legislative role, was reconfigured. The New Jersey Superior Court had subsumed and replaced county courts in 1983. The executive offices are located in the county seat, Hackensack.

The executive is directly elected at-large to a four-year term on a partisan basis. Since the first county executive took office, five individuals have served in the position. In 2014, incumbent James J. "Jim" Tedesco III was elected to his first term, being re-elected in 2018. As of Election Day 2017 there were 593,454 registered voters in the county, which in 2016 had estimated an estimated population of 939,151.

== History ==
In 1972, the State of New Jersey passed the Optional County Charter Law, which provides for four different manners in which a county could be governed: by an executive, an administrator, a board president or a county supervisor.

A referendum to change the Bergen County form of government was held in 1974 and was rejected by a margin of 132,168 to 123,106, making Bergen one of four counties to reject proposals modifying the structure of county government, while four other counties passed changes. The measure was supported by the League of Women Voters and other groups as a method of improving the management of the county, while the loss of "home rule" in the county's 70 municipalities was one of the issues driving opposition to the referendum.

In 1985, a second referendum was held. The proposal to create an executive branch was approved by a high margin: of the 490,437 registered voters, 116,031 voted for and 70,331 against. The change also reduced the number of members of the legislative branch, Board of County Commissioners, from nine to seven. The judicial branch, namely the county court, had been subsumed and replaced by the New Jersey Superior Court Law Division in 1983.

The executive has power to appoint a County Administrator as well as department heads (with approval of the Board). Responsibilities include preparation/submission of operating and capital budgets, introduction of legislation, the hiring and dismissal of personnel, and approval or veto Freeholder ordinances. The Board of Commissioners board has the power to investigate administrative actions of the executive, approve ordinances and resolutions, initiate service contracts with municipalities, and adopt an administrative code.

Bergen is one of five counties in New Jersey with a county executive, the others being Atlantic, Essex, Hudson and Mercer.

== County executives ==
=== William D. McDowell: 1987–1991 ===
William D. McDowell served one term. McDowell had earlier served on board of the New Jersey Meadowlands Commission.

McDowell, who at the time was County Sheriff, faced Democrat Matthew Feldman, a five-term member of the New Jersey Senate and former Senate President in the race. McDowell was endorsed by Doris Mahalick, Feldman's rival for the Democratic nomination. McDowell beat Feldman by a margin of nearly 20,000, capturing 112,619 votes (55% of ballots cast) to 92,649 (45%) for Feldman.

=== Pat Schuber: 1991–2003 ===
William "Pat" Schuber, a Republican, served 12 years as the County Executive. Schuber had previously served both as a councilman and mayor of Bogota, New Jersey and was elected to five successive terms in the New Jersey General Assembly In 2011, he was appointed to a six-year term on the board of commissioners of the Port Authority of New York and New Jersey (PANYNJ).

=== Dennis McNerney: 2003–2011 ===
Dennis McNerney, who served from 2003 to 2011, was the first Democrat to serve as County Executive.

McNerney defeated Republican Henry McNamara in the 2002 general election and took office in January 2003 after being elected to the Bergen County Board of Chosen Freeholders in 1998 and 2001 McNerney was reelected to his second term of office as county executive in 2006, defeating former Freeholder Todd Caliguire, after outspending the Republican by a 6-1 margin. He lost reelection in 2010 to County Clerk Kathleen Donovan, in a race in which the Republicans captured all three open seats on the Board of Chosen Freeholders to regain control on the board.

In his February 2008 State of the County address, McNerney called for Bergen County municipalities with populations less than 10,000 to merge, saying "The surest way to significantly lower homeowners' property taxes is to merge small towns and reduce administrative overhead." Half of Bergen County's municipalities (35/70) had fewer than 10,000 residents each then.

=== Kathleen Donovan: 2011–2015 ===
Kathleen A. Donovan is a Republican who served one term as county executive.

Donovan was a part-time public defender of her hometown, Lyndhurst, from 1983 to 1988. From 1986 to 1988, she represented the 36th Legislative District in the New Jersey General Assembly. She was first elected County Clerk in 1988 and was reelected in 1993, 1998, 2003, and 2008. As County Clerk, she also functioned as Recorder of Deeds for Bergen County.

In 1994, Donovan was appointed by Gov. Christine Todd Whitman to the Board of Commissioners of the Port Authority of New York and New Jersey; she later became the chairwoman. Donovan stepped down as Port Authority Chairwoman in December 1995, in order to unsuccessfully run for Congress in the 1996 election, but retained her seat on the Port Authority's Board of Commissioners. Donovan remained a Port Authority Commissioner until 2002, when she was replaced by Gov. James McGreevey, as her term expired.

Donovan unsuccessfully sought support to run for Bergen County executive in the 2002 Republican primary, and lost her campaign for the 2006 Republican nomination for county executive. Donovan ran for county executive in 2010, and was swept into office with her three Freeholder running mates, in an election in which perceived corruption by the Democratic incumbents, rising spending, and tax rates were the major issues. Donovan won with 53% of the vote (117,100), while McNerney received 47% (104,367).

=== James Tedesco: 2015–present ===
James J. Tedesco III was sworn as county executive just hours into 2015, later being publicly sworn in on January 4, 2015, at Bergen Community College. Before being elected as county executive, Tedesco served as a councilman in Paramus from 2000 through 2002, and served two terms as mayor there, from 2003 through 2010.

Tedesco was elected to the Bergen County Board of Chosen Freeholders on November 5, 2013 and took office in January 2014. Before beginning his term as Freeholder, he testified on the citizens' behalf at a Port Authority Board meeting on the Fort Lee lane closure scandal in November 2013.

After winning the Democratic nomination, Tedesco challenged incumbent county executive Kathleen Donovan. in an election in which the major issues were the county budget, consolidation of the county police and sheriff, and issues regarding lawsuits filed between the different branches of government. Tedesco won with 54.2% of the vote (107,958), ahead of Donovan with 45.8% (91,300), in a race in which Tedesco's campaign had spent nearly $1 million, outspending Donovan by a 2-1 margin.

On his first day in office, Tedesco approved an arrangement merging the Bergen County Police Department and Bergen County Sheriff's Office. The deal went through following the approval of the freeholders.

In 2017, Tedesco signed an executive order raising the minimum wage for county employees to $15 per hour.

Tedesco successfully ran for re-election in 2018, handily beating then Bergenfield Mayor Norman Schmelz with a final tally of 204,816 votes to 121,654. He was sworn in on January 1, 2019 in front of a capacity crowd at the Bergen County Academies.

On June 10, 2021, Tedesco announced that he would be running for a third term in 2022, looking to become the second three-term county-executive in Bergen County history; he would successfully do so, defeating Midland Park business/legal consultant, former Freeholder, and frequent candidate since then, Todd Caliguire, 55.7%-44.3%.

== See also ==
- Atlantic County Executive
- Essex County Executive
- Hudson County Executive
- Mercer County Executive
- Borough president
