= Rocco Neri =

American politician

Rococo Neri

Member of the New Jersey General Assembly from the 28th Legislative District
- In office January 8, 1974 – January 13, 1976 Serving with Philip Keegan
- Preceded by: District created
- Succeeded by: Patrick Scanlon and Peter Shapiro

Personal details
- Born: September 26, 1919 Newark, New Jersey
- Died: October 6, 2011 (aged 92)
- Party: Democratic

Rococo Neri (September 26, 1919 – October 6, 2011) was an American Democratic Party politician who represented the 28th Legislative District in the New Jersey General Assembly from 1974 to 1976.

Born in Newark, Neri attended West Side High School. He served in the New Jersey National Guard for nine years following his five years of service during World War II in the United States Army.

A resident of Irvington, Neri was the Essex County Undersheriff from 1972 to 1980, serving under Sheriff John F. Cryan, and owned Stuyvesant Auto Body for three decades. He was elected to the State Assembly in 1973, representing the 28th district that included Irvington, South Orange and parts of Newark. He and running mate Philip Keegan won the Democratic primary without opposition and defeated Republicans Joseph T. DeVizio and Charles C. Deubal Jr. by a margin of more than 2–1 in the general election. Neri sought re-election to a second term in 1975 together with Patrick Scanlon, but was unsuccessful. Scanlon won, but despite the support of the powerful Essex County Democratic Committee, Neri lost the Democratic primary by 183 votes to 23-year-old Peter Shapiro, who mounted a grass roots campaign that included personal visits from his Harvard classmate, Robert F. Kennedy, Jr.

In August 1979, Neri was indicted together with Sheriff John F. Cryan as part of an alleged conspiracy in which employees in the sheriff's department were given raises and other benefits in exchange for bribes. Neri and his co-defendants faced up to 40 years in jail. Due to defects in the manner in which the charges had been drawn, the case against all four was dismissed in May 1980.

A resident of Toms River, New Jersey since 1985, Neri died in Lakewood Township on October 6, 1991.
