= City manager =

Administrative manager of an American city

A city manager is an official appointed as the administrative manager of a city in the council–manager form of city government. Local officials serving in this position are referred to as the chief executive officer (CEO) or chief administrative officer (CAO) in some municipalities.

== Responsibilities ==
In a technical sense, the term "city manager", in contrast to "chief administrative officer" (CAO), implies more discretion and independent authority than is set forth in a charter or some other body of codified law, as opposed to duties being assigned on a varying basis by a single superior, such as a mayor.

As the top appointed official in the city, the city manager is typically responsible for most if not all of the day-to-day administrative operations of the municipality, in addition to other expectations.

Some of the basic roles, responsibilities, and powers of a city manager include:

- Supervision of day-to-day operations of all city departments and staff through department heads;
- Oversight of all recruitment, dismissal, disciplining and suspensions;
- Preparation, monitoring, and execution of the city budget, which includes submitting each year to the council a proposed budget package with options and recommendations for its consideration and possible approval;
- Main technical advisor to the council on overall governmental operations;
- Public relations, such as meeting with citizens, citizen groups, businesses, and other stakeholders (the presence of a mayor may alter this function somewhat);
- Operating the city with a professional understanding of how all city functions operate together to their best effect;
- Attends all council meetings, but does not have any voting rights
- Additional duties that may be assigned by the council

The responsibilities may vary depending upon charter provisions and other local or state laws, rules, and regulations. In addition, many states, such as the states of New Hampshire and Missouri, have codified in law the minimum functions a local "manager" must perform. The City Manager position focuses on efficiency and providing a certain level of service for the lowest possible cost. The competence of a city manager can be assessed using composite indicators.

Manager members of the International City/County Management Association (ICMA) are bound by a rather rigid and strongly enforced code of ethics that was originally established in 1924. Since that time the code had been up-dated/revised on seven occasions, the latest taking place in 1998. The updates have taken into account the evolving duties, responsibilities, and expectations of the profession; However the core dictate of the body of the code--"to integrity; public service; seek no favor; exemplary conduct in both personal and professional matters; respect the role and contributions of elected officials; exercise the independence to do what is right; political neutrality; serve the public equitably and governing body members equally; keep the community informed about local government matters; and support and lead our employ-ees"—have not changed since the first edition.

== History ==
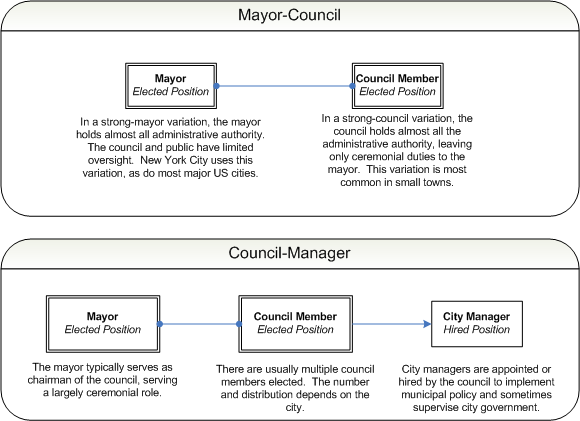
Municipal government diagram.

Most sources trace the first city manager to Staunton, Virginia in 1908. Some of the other cities that were among the first to employ a manager were Sumter, South Carolina (1912) and Dayton, Ohio (1914); Dayton was featured in the national media, and became a national standard. The first "City Manager's Association" meeting of eight city managers was in December 1914. The city manager, operating under the council-manager government form, was created in part to remove city government from the power of the political parties, and place management of the city into the hands of an outside expert who was usually a business manager or engineer, with the expectation that the city manager would remain neutral to city politics. By 1930, two hundred American cities used a city manager form of government.

In 1913, the city of Dayton, Ohio suffered a great flood, and responded with the innovation of a paid, non-political city manager, hired by the commissioners to run the bureaucracy; civil engineers were especially preferred. Other small or middle-sized American cities, especially in the West, adopted the idea.

In Europe, smaller cities in the Netherlands were specially attracted by the plan.

By 1940, there were small American cities with city managers that would grow enormously by the end of the century: Austin, Texas; Charlotte, North Carolina; Dallas, Texas; Dayton, Ohio; Rochester, New York; and San Diego, California.

== Profile ==
In the early years of the profession, most managers came from the ranks of the engineering professions. Today, the typical and preferred background and education for the beginning municipal manager is a master's degree in Public Administration (MPA), and at least several years' experience as a department head in local government, or as an assistant city manager. As of 2005, more than 60% of those in the profession had a MPA, MBA, or other related higher-level degree.

The average tenure of a manager is now 7–8 years, and has risen gradually over the years. Tenures tend to be less in smaller communities and higher in larger ones, and they tend to vary as well, depending on the region of the country.

Educational Level of Local Government Managers (MYB = Municipal Yearbook; SOP = State of the Profession survey):

	1935	1964	1974	1984	1995	2000	2006	2012
High school or less	42%	14%	6%	2%	4%	2%	4%	1%
Some college, no degree	21%	22%	18%	10%	—	9%	11%	6%
Bachelor's degree	35%	41%	38%	30%	24%	26%	27%	23%
MPA degree	—	18%	—	—	44%	—	37%	43%
Other graduate degree	2%	5%	38%	58%	28%	63%	21%	27%
Source	1940 MYB	1965 MYB	1990 MYB		1996 MYB	2001 MYB	2006 SOP survey	2012 SOP Survey
Sample size	n = 449	n = 1,582	n not reported		n =2 65	n = 3,175	n = 2,752	n = 1,816

== See also ==
- Council-manager government
- Local government in the United States
- County administrator
- Clerk (municipal official)
