= Board of county commissioners (New Jersey) =

New Jersey county government

In New Jersey, a board of county commissioners (until 2020 named the board of chosen freeholders) is the elected county-wide government board in each of the state's 21 counties. In the five counties that have an elected county executive, the board of county commissioners serves as the county legislature. In the remaining counties, the board of county commissioners exercises both executive and legislative functions, often with an appointed county administrator or manager overseeing the day-to-day operations of county government.

As of 2025, 18 of the 21 county commissions are held exclusively by one party; Atlantic, Gloucester, and Cumberland counties are the only ones with both parties represented. Since 2000, 12 counties have only elected members from a single party; Camden, Essex, Hudson, Mercer, Middlesex, and Union counties have chosen only Democrats, and Cape May, Hunterdon, Morris, Ocean, Sussex, and Warren counties have chosen only Republicans; as of 2026, Morris County has had the longest streak of all counties in the state in terms of only electing county commissioners/freeholders from one party, with the most recent Democratic member of that county board having been elected in 1973.

== Origin ==
New Jersey's former system of naming its county legislative bodies "boards of chosen freeholders" was unique in the United States. The origin of the name can be traced back to a law passed by the General Assembly of the Province of New Jersey on February 28, 1713/14, which stated:

That the Inhabitants of each Town and Precinct, within each County, shall assemble and meet together on the second Tuesday in March yearly and every Year, at the most publick Place of each respective Town and Precinct, and, by the Majority of Voices, choose two Freeholders for every such Town and Precinct for the ensuing Year; which county commissioners so chosen, or the major Part of them, together with all the Justices of Peace of each respective County, or any three of them (one whereof being of the Quorum) shall meet together… [for the purpose of taking actions related to the construction and maintenance of county courthouses and jails].

The term "freeholder" as originally used in "Board of Chosen Freeholders" originally referred to individuals who owned land (as opposed to leasing it) in an amount set by law, and was derived from the term freehold. "Chosen" means elected.

The New Jersey State Constitution of 1776, contained the following voter qualification provisions applicable to those voting in New Jersey elections, including county freeholder elections:

That all inhabitants of this Colony, of full age, who are worth fifty pounds proclamation money, clear estate in the same, and have resided within the county in which they claim a vote for twelve months immediately preceding the election, shall be entitled to vote for Representatives in Council and Assembly; and also for all other public officers, that shall be elected by the people of the county at large.

On March 3, 1786, a law was passed that incorporated the justices and chosen freeholders of each county as a body politic for the purpose of owning the county courthouse, jail, and other public buildings. These bodies were styled as the "Board of Justices and chosen Freeholders" of each respective county.

A law that was passed on February 13, 1798, reincorporated the chosen freeholders into bodies that were named "The Board of Chosen Freeholders" of their respective counties. Under the new law, the functions previously performed by the justices and the chosen freeholders together were now performed by the freeholders alone. These included the authority to build and maintain jails, court houses, and bridges. The Chosen freeholders were also now given the authority to build and operate poor houses.

== Current use ==
Current state law specifies that the boards may contain from three to nine seats. Due to the small sizes of the boards and the possibility of electing an exactly split legislature with the inevitably resulting deadlock, an odd-numbered board is required under the same law. The means of election of the county commissioners vary, from all elected in districts, to all elected at large, to various systems in between. Elections are first past the post for single-member districts, as well as at-large elections when only one seat is at stake. For at-large elections with more than one seat, plurality-at-large voting is officially used.

Depending on the county, the executive and legislative functions may be performed by the board, or split between commissioners and other county officials. In some counties, members of the board of county commissioner perform both legislative and executive functions on a commission basis, with each county commissioner assigned responsibility for a department or group of departments. In other counties (Atlantic, Bergen, Essex, Hudson, and Mercer), there is a directly elected county executive who performs the executive functions while the board of county commissioner retains a legislative and oversight role. In counties without an executive, a county administrator (or county manager) may be hired to perform the day-to-day administration of county functions. All of the above attributes may be changed by act of the board, and referendum, or explicit change of the relevant laws by the New Jersey Legislature.

== Controversy and name change ==
The term "freeholder," which is used in no other state, had been criticized as an archaic remitment of the time when only property owners could be elected, which led to white men controlling political power at a time when women and black people were unable to own property on their own.

In early July 2020, New Jersey Governor Phil Murphy reached an agreement with Democratic leaders in both state legislative chambers under which the term "freeholder" would be eliminated and replaced with "county commissioner". On July 14, 2020, Burlington County Freeholder Director Felicia Hopson called for "eliminating an antiquated title from an era when slavery and racism was tolerated" and announced plans for Burlington County to stop using the "freeholder" title on official communications and materials. The board planned to replace the title with "county commissioner" by passing a resolution at its August 20 meeting.

On August 21, 2020, "amid a national reckoning to reexamine vestiges of structural racism," Governor Murphy signed Senate Bill 855, which changed the name of county governing bodies and mandates updates to website, letterhead, stationery, and other materials.Lt. Governor Sheila Oliver, an African-American woman who was once a freeholder herself, said that the term "refers to a time when only white male landowners could hold public office."

The legislation took effect on January 1, 2021, and requires compliance within "one year of the bill's effective date" or January 1, 2022.

== Structure by county ==
All county commissioners are elected to three-year terms, while the Atlantic, Bergen, Essex, Hudson, and Mercer County executives are elected to four-year terms.

County	No. of members	Election frequency	Representation	Notes	References
Atlantic	9	Staggered elections	Five county commissioners represent equally populated districts, four are elected at-large; three seats per three-year cycle	Popularly elected Atlantic County Executive, every four years; currently Republican Dennis Levinson	
Bergen	7	Staggered elections	Elected at-large; generally two or three seats per three-year cycle	Popularly elected Bergen County Executive, every four years; currently Democrat Jim Tedesco	
Burlington	5	Staggered elections	Elected at-large; generally one or two seats per three-year cycle	County commissioner director is elected annually by the board from among its members	
Camden	7	Staggered elections	Elected at-large; generally two or three seats per three-year cycle		
Cape May	5	Staggered elections	Elected at-large; generally one or two seats per three-year cycle	County commissioner director and county commissioner deputy director elected from board at annual reorganization meeting in January	
Cumberland	7	Staggered elections	Elected at-large; generally two or three seats per three-year cycle	County commissioner director and county commissioner deputy director elected from board at annual reorganization meeting in January; appointed county administrator	
Essex	9	Concurrent elections	Five county commissioners represent equally populated districts, four are elected at-large; all nine individual terms end every three years	County commissioner president and vice president serve one-year terms; popularly elected Essex County Executive, every four years; currently Democrat Joseph N. DiVincenzo, Jr.	
Gloucester	7	Staggered elections	Elected at-large; generally two or three seats per three-year cycle	County commissioner director and county commissioner deputy director	
Hudson	9	Concurrent elections	Nine County Commissioners represent equally populated districts; all nine individual terms end every three years	Popularly elected Hudson County Executive, every four years; currently Democrat Craig Guy.	
Hunterdon	5	Staggered elections	Elected at-large; generally one or two seats per three-year cycle	County commissioner director and county commissioner deputy director elected from board at annual reorganization meeting in January	
Mercer	7	Staggered elections	Elected at-large; generally two or three seats per three-year cycle	Board has a chair and vice-chair, these positions are rotated among board members each year; popularly elected Mercer County Executive, every four years; currently Democrat Daniel R. Benson.	
Middlesex	7	Staggered elections	Elected at-large; generally two or three seats per three-year cycle	In January of each year, the board reorganizes, selecting one county commissioner to be commissioner director and another to be county commissioner deputy director; county commissioner director appoints county commissioner to serve as chairpersons and members on the various committees which oversee county departments	
Monmouth	5	Staggered elections	Elected at-large; generally one or two seats per three-year cycle	County Commissioner Director and county commissioner deputy director elected from board at annual reorganization meeting in January	
Morris	7	Staggered elections	Elected at-large; generally two or three seats per three-year cycle	County commissioner director and county commissioner deputy director elected from board at annual reorganization meeting in January	
Ocean	5	Staggered elections	Elected at-large; generally one or two seats per three-year cycle	Appointed county administrator	
Passaic	7	Staggered elections	Elected at-large; generally two or three seats per three-year cycle	County commissioner director and county commissioner deputy director elected from board at annual reorganization meeting in January	
Salem	5	Staggered elections	Elected at-large; generally one or two seats per three-year cycle	In January of each year, the board reorganizes, selecting one county commissioner to be county commissioner director and another to be county commissioner deputy director; eliminated county administrator position at its 2014 reorganization meeting	
Somerset	5	Staggered elections	Elected at-large; generally one or two seats per three-year cycle	Appointed county administrator	
Sussex	5	Staggered elections	Elected at-large; generally one or two seats per three-year cycle		
Union	9	Staggered elections	Elected at-large; three seats per three-year cycle	Appointed county manager	
Warren	3	Staggered elections	Elected at-large; one seat per three-year cycle	County commissioner director and county commissioner deputy director elected from board at annual reorganization meeting in January; appointed county administrator	

== See also ==
- Board of selectmen, New England town government
- Board of supervisors
- Police Jury (Louisiana)
- County council
- County commission
- Sole commissioner
- County government
- Fiscal Court (Kentucky)
- Commissioners' court (Texas and Missouri; known in Arkansas as "Quorum Court")
