= Philip Keegan =

American politician

Chair of the New Jersey Democratic Party
- In office 1990–1992
- Preceded by: Raymond M. Durkin
- Succeeded by: Raymond Lesniak

Member of the New Jersey General Assembly from the 28th district
- In office 1974–1975

Personal details
- Born: Philip M. Keegan; April 20, 1942
- Died: February 23, 1998 (aged 55)
- Party: Democrat

Philip M. Keegan (April 20, 1942 – February 23, 1998) was an American Democratic Party politician who served as a New Jersey Assemblyman and as the New Jersey Democratic State Chairman.

Keegan was a political prodigy, serving as national executive director of the Young Democrats. In 1971, at age 29, he was elected to the Essex County Board of Freeholders.

He was elected to the State Assembly in 1973, representing the 28th district that included South Orange, Irvington and parts of Newark. He won the Democratic primary without opposition, and defeated Republicans Joseph T. DeVizio and Charles C. Deubal, Jr. by a margin of more than 2–1. Keegan was the top vote getter in that race, edging out his running mate, Rocco Neri, by 439 votes. He did not seek re-election to a second term in 1975. Instead, he spent nearly 20 years building his engineering firm, PMK, and working as a public relations executive for Bally's Casino in Atlantic City.

Governor James Florio called Keegan back into service in 1990 to serve as New Jersey's Democratic State Chairman.

Party political offices
Preceded by Raymond M. Durkin	Chair of the New Jersey Democratic Party; 1990–1992	Succeeded by Raymond Lesniak
