= County administrator =

Unelected county official

A county administrator or county manager is an unelected official appointed to be the chief administrative officer of a county in the United States. They are usually nominated by the county executive and appointed by the county council. This position is analogous to a city manager at the county-level.

In some counties, the equivalent position is the county executive (although this term is sometimes used to refer to a directly or indirectly elected official, and not a hired employee) or county chief administrative officer (CAO) in some counties, and county judge in others. The term "county manager," as opposed to CAO, implies more discretion and independent authority that is set forth in a charter or some other body of codified law, as opposed to duties being assigned on a varying basis to a single superior such as a county commissioner.

The International City/County Management Association (ICMA) is the professional association for county administrators.

== History ==
The county administrator/manager, operating under the council-manager government form, was created in part to remove county government from the power of the political parties, and place management of the county into the hands of an outside expert who was usually a business manager or engineer, with the hope that the county manager would remain neutral to county politics.

== Responsibilities ==
As the top appointed official in the county, the county administrator/manager is typically responsible for most if not all of the day-to-day administrative operations of the county, in addition to other expectations.

Some of the basic roles, responsibilities, and powers of a county administrator/manager include:

- Supervision of day-to-day operations of all county departments and staff, directly and through department heads;
- Oversight of hiring, firing, disciplining and suspensions of all county employees;
- Preparation, monitoring, and execution of the county budget, which includes submitting each year to the council a proposed budget package with options and recommendations for its consideration and possible approval;
- Main technical advisor to the council on overall governmental operations;
- Public relations, such as meeting with citizens, citizen groups, businesses, and other stakeholders (the presence of a county commissioner may alter this function somewhat);
- Operating the county with a professional understanding of how all county functions operate together to their best effect;
- Attends all council meetings, but does not have any voting rights
- Additional duties that may be assigned by the council

The responsibilities may vary depending upon charter provisions and other local or state laws, rules, and regulations.

== Profile ==
Today the typical and preferred background and education for the beginning county manager is a Master of Public Administration (MPA) or other master's degree in public administration and at least several years’ experience as a department head in local government or as an assistant county manager. The average tenure of a manager is now 7–8 years and has risen gradually over the years. Tenures tend to be less in smaller communities and higher in larger ones, and they tend to vary as well depending on the region of the country.

== See also ==
- City manager
- Local government
- Council–manager government
