= County executive =

Head of government of a US county

A county executive is the elected head of government of a county in the United States.

The title for a person holding this position varies depending on the state. Many states with county executives refer to the position as "county executive," but common alternative titles include "county mayor," "county judge," "county judge-executive," "county president", "county chair," "county administrator", "county commissioner", "chief executive officer," or, in New York, "borough president." In consolidated city-counties, the executive may be referred to as the "mayor" of the city. For example, the "Mayor of San Francisco" technically serves as the mayor of the city and county of San Francisco. In some cases, they are referred to as “county mayor” such as in the case of Miami-Dade County or Knox County, Tennessee.

The duties of a county executive vary from state to state, but typically include presiding over the county council, signing bills passed by the county council into ordinance, managing county government agencies, finances, projects, and services; and appointing some county officials such as the sheriff.

The first county executives were established in Cook County, Illinois, in 1893, with the state legislature's creation of the President of the County Board, and in New Jersey with the creation of county executives in 1900, though these offices' powers were more limited. However, the growth of modern county executives began in Westchester County, New York, in 1938. Today, approximately 700 counties have elected executives.

== States with county executives ==
State	Counties	Notes
Alaska	Aleutians East Borough (Borough Mayor), Anchorage (Mayor of Anchorage), Bristol Bay Borough (Borough Mayor), Denali Borough (Borough Mayor), Fairbanks North Star Borough (Borough Mayor), Haines Borough (Borough Mayor), Juneau (Mayor of Juneau), Kenai Peninsula Borough (Borough Mayor), Ketchikan Gateway Borough (Borough Mayor), Kodiak Island Borough (Borough Mayor), Lake and Peninsula Borough (Borough Mayor), Matanuska-Susitna Borough (Borough Mayor), North Slope Borough (Borough Mayor), Northwest Arctic Borough (Borough Mayor), Sitka (Mayor of Sitka), Skagway (Mayor of Skagway), Wrangell (Mayor of Wrangell), Yakutat (Mayor of Yakutat)	All organized boroughs in Alaska have elected borough mayors. The Unorganized Borough does not have a county- or borough-level government.
Arkansas	All counties in Arkansas have an elected county executive, called a "county judge."	
California	Los Angeles (County Executive beginning in 2028), San Francisco (Mayor of San Francisco)	
Colorado	Denver (Mayor of Denver)	
Delaware	New Castle (County Executive)	
Florida	Duval County (Mayor of Jacksonville), Miami-Dade County (Mayor), Orange County (Mayor), Volusia County (Chair)	
Georgia	Athens–Clarke County (Mayor of Athens), Augusta–Richmond County (Mayor of Augusta) DeKalb County (Chief Executive Officer), Macon–Bibb County (Mayor of Macon)	Bartow, Bleckley, Chattooga, Murray, Pulaski, Towns, and Union counties also have sole commissioners who exercise both legislative and executive power.
Hawaii	Hawaiʻi County (Mayor), Honolulu (Mayor of Honolulu), Kauaʻi County (Mayor), Maui County (Mayor)	Kalawao County lacks self-government and is administered by the Hawaii Department of Health.
Illinois	Champaign County (County Executive), Cook County (President of the County Board of Commissioners), Will County (County Executive)	
Indiana	Marion County (Mayor of Indianapolis)	
Kansas	Wyandotte County (Mayor of Kansas City)	
Kentucky	All counties in Kentucky have an elected county executive, called a "county judge-executive."	
Louisiana	Ascension Parish (Parish President), East Baton Rouge Parish (Mayor-President of Baton Rouge), Iberia Parish (Parish President), Iberville Parish (Parish President), Jefferson Parish (Parish President), Lafayette Parish (Mayor-President of Lafayette), Lafourche Parish (Parish President), Livingston Parish (Parish President), Natchitoches Parish (Parish President), Orleans Parish (Mayor of New Orleans), Plaquemines Parish (Parish President), Pointe Coupee Parish (Parish President), St. Bernard Parish (Parish President), St. Charles Parish (Parish President), St. James Parish (Parish President), St. John the Baptist Parish (Parish President), St. Landry Parish (Parish President), St. Martin Parish (Parish President), St. Mary Parish (Parish President), St. Tammany Parish (Parish President), Tangipahoa Parish (Parish President), Terrebonne Parish (Parish President), Washington Parish (Parish President), West Baton Rouge Parish (Parish President), West Feliciana Parish (Parish President)	
Maryland	Anne Arundel County (County Executive), Baltimore County (County Executive), Cecil County (County Executive), Frederick County (County Executive), Harford County (County Executive), Howard County (County Executive), Montgomery County (County Executive), Prince George's County (County Executive), Wicomico County (County Executive)	
Michigan	Bay County (County Executive), Macomb County (County Executive), Oakland County (County Executive), Wayne County (County Executive)	
Missouri	Jefferson County (County Executive), Jackson County (County Executive), St. Charles County (County Executive), St. Louis County (County Executive),	
Montana	Deer Lodge County (Anaconda–Deer Lodge County Chief Executive Officer), Silver Bow County (Butte–Silver Bow Chief Executive)	
New Jersey	Atlantic County (County Executive), Bergen County (County Executive), Essex County (County Executive), Hudson County (County Executive), Mercer County (County Executive)	
New York	Albany County (County Executive), Broome County (County Executive), Chautauqua County (County Executive), Chemung County (County Executive), Dutchess County (County Executive), Erie County (County Executive), Kings County (Brooklyn Borough President), New York County (Manhattan Borough President), Monroe County (County Executive), Montgomery County (County Executive), Nassau County (County Executive), Oneida County (County Executive), Onondaga County (County Executive), Orange County (County Executive), Putnam County (County Executive), Queens County (Queens Borough President), Rensselaer County (County Executive), Rockland County (County Executive), Richmond County (Staten Island Borough President), Suffolk County (County Executive), Ulster County (County Executive), Westchester County (County Executive)	The elected borough presidents of New York City's five boroughs historically held significant executive authority. However, their powers were substantially reduced following the 1989 amendments to the New York City Charter, enacted in response to the United States Supreme Court’s decision in Board of Estimate of City of New York v. Morris, which found the composition of the New York City Board of Estimate unconstitutional.
Ohio	Cuyahoga County (County Executive), Summit County (County Executive)	
Pennsylvania	Allegheny County (County Executive), Erie County (County Executive), Lehigh County (County Executive), Northampton County (County Executive).	
Tennessee	All counties in Tennessee have an elected county executive, usually referred to as a "county mayor."	In 2003, the Tennessee General Assembly passed a law changing the name of "county executives" to "county mayors," though the General Assembly can maintain the title of "county executive" by passing a private law that the voters of the county ratify. Three counties have a consolidated city-county governments. In Davidson County, which is consolidated with Nashville, the mayor is titled the Mayor of the Metropolitan Government of Nashville and Davidson County. Moore County is consolidated with Lynchburg and the mayor is titled the Mayor of Metropolitan Lynchburg and Moore County. Trousdale County is consolidated with Hartsville and the mayor is titled the Hartsville/Trousdale County Mayor.
Texas	All counties in Texas have an elected county executive, called a "county judge."	
Utah	Cache County (County Executive), Salt Lake County (Mayor)	
Washington	King County (County Executive), Pierce County (County Executive), Snohomish County (County Executive), Whatcom County (County Executive)	
Wisconsin	Brown County (County Executive), Dane County (County Executive), Fond du Lac County (County Executive), Kenosha County (County Executive), Manitowoc County (County Executive), Milwaukee County (County Executive), Outagamie County (County Executive), Portage County (County Executive), Racine County (County Executive), Washington County (County Executive), Waukesha County (County Executive), Winnebago County (County Executive)	The first county executive was created in Milwaukee County. In 1959, the Wisconsin Legislature created the County Executive position, with the first election taking place in 1960. In 1962, voters ratified an amendment to the Wisconsin Constitution that established the office and clarified its powers in any county in which it was created. In 1969, the state legislature allowed any county to establish a county executive. All county executive elections are nonpartisan and take place in the statewide spring election.

== Notable county executives ==
- Spiro Agnew, Vice President of the United States (1969-1973); Governor of Maryland (1967-1969); Baltimore County Executive (1962-1966)
- Angela Alsobrooks, U.S. Senator from Maryland (2025–present); Prince George's County Executive (2018–2024)
- Chris Coons, U.S. Senator from Delaware (2010–present); New Castle County Executive (2005–2010)
- Booth Gardner, Governor of Washington (1985–1993); Pierce County Executive (1981–1985)
- Parris Glendening, Governor of Maryland (1995–2003); Prince George's County Executive (1982–1994)
- Gary Locke, U.S. Secretary of Commerce (2009–2011); Governor of Washington (1997–2005); King County Executive (1994–1997)
- Linda Lingle, Governor of Hawaii (2002–2010); Mayor of Maui County (1991–1999)
- Mel Martínez, U.S. Senator from Florida (2005–2009); U.S. Secretary of Housing and Urban Development (2001–2004); Orange County Chairman (1999–2001)
- John Spellman, Governor of Washington (1981–1985); King County Executive (1969–1981)
- Harry S. Truman, President of the United States (1945–1953); Presiding Judge of Jackson County (1927–1935)
- Scott Walker, Governor of Wisconsin (2011–2019); Milwaukee County Executive (2002–2010)

== See also ==
- County commission
- Borough president
