= Rosy Bagolie =

Dominican-American politician

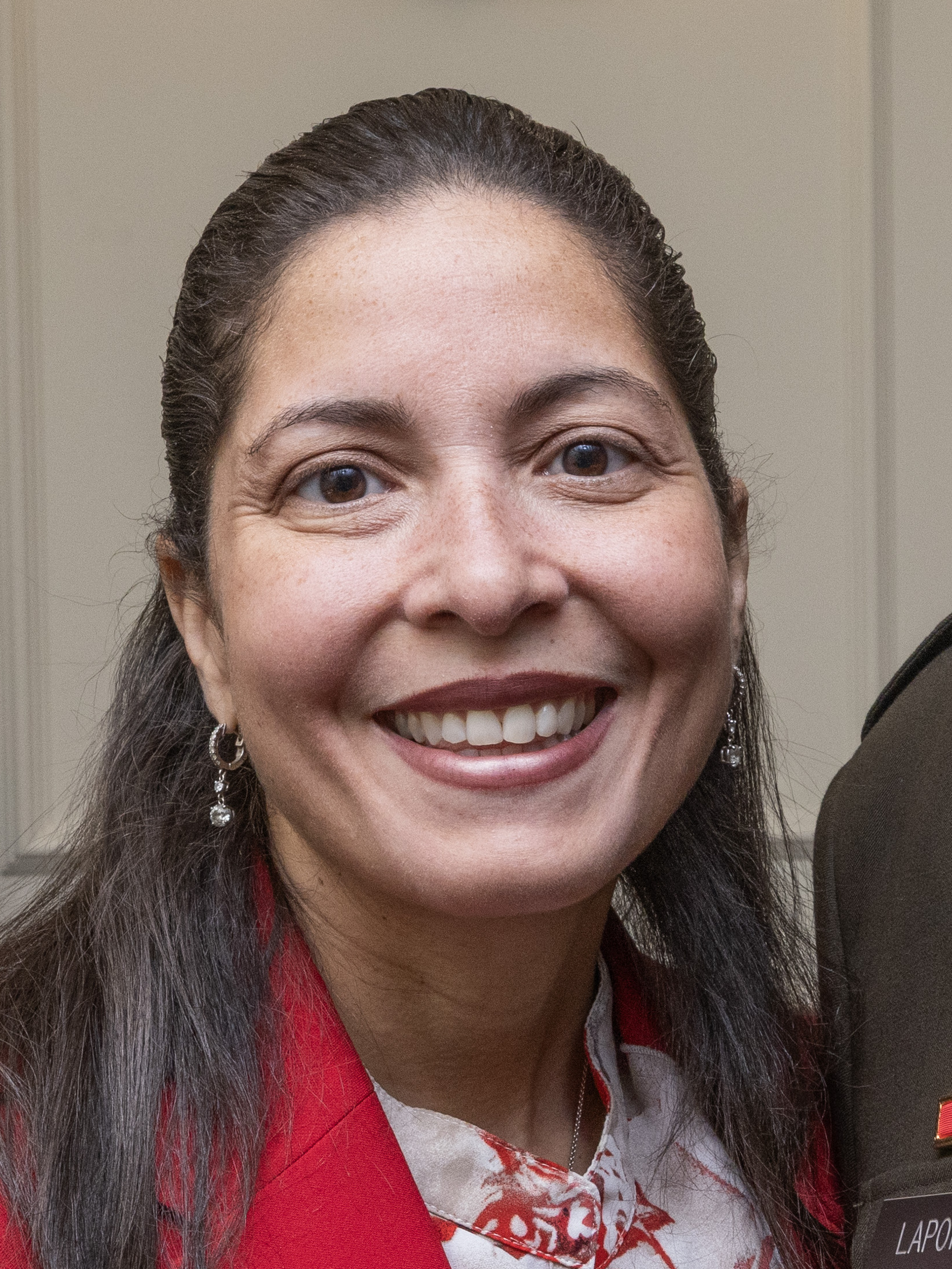
- Bagolie in 2025

Member of the New Jersey General Assembly from the 27th district
- Incumbent
- Assumed office January 9, 2024 Serving with Alixon Collazos-Gill
- Preceded by: Mila Jasey; John F. McKeon

Personal details
- Born: June 14, 1980 (age 46) Dominican Republic
- Party: Democratic
- Education: Seton Hall University (BA, MA, EdD); Rutgers University, New Brunswick (MEd)
- Website: State Assembly website

Rosaura "Rosy" Bagolie is an American school administrator and Democratic Party politician serving as a member of the New Jersey General Assembly for the 27th legislative district, having taken office on January 9, 2024.

== Biography ==
Bagolie emigrated from the Dominican Republic and settled with her family in Elizabeth, New Jersey, where she graduated from Elizabeth High School. She earned graduate degrees in education at Seton Hall University and Rutgers University. She is employed as both the principal and superintendent of the East Newark School District.

Her husband, Ricky, is a lawyer working for the joint venture Bagolie–Friedman Injury Lawyers. He graduated from Rutgers Law School in 1993. They have three children. She is Jewish.

== Elective office ==
Bagolie was elected to the Livingston Township Council in 2022.

Following the 2021 reapportionment, all of the municipalities in Morris County were removed from the district, while the Passaic County municipality of Clifton was shifted from its longtime home in the 34th district. In the June 2023 Democratic primary, the first held under the 2021 reapportionment, incumbent Senator Richard Codey defeated incumbent 34th district Senator Nia Gill, though Codey announced in August that he would retire at the end of the term. McKeon was selected to replace Codey on the November ballot for Senate while Mila Jasey retired after her hometown was moved out of the district, with newcomers Bagolie and Alixon Collazos-Gill ultimately chosen to be the two Democratic Assembly candidates.

Bagolie and Collazos-Gill defeated Republicans Irene DeVita and Michael G. Mecca Jr. in the 2023 New Jersey General Assembly election. Bagolie was one of 27 members elected for the first time to serve in the General Assembly in 2024, more than one-third of the 80 seats.

In 2025, Bagolie and Collazos-Gill defeated primary challengers Rohit Dave and Blake Michael. In the 2025 General Election, Bagolie defeated republicans Adam Kraemer and Robert Iommazzo, as well as receiving more votes than her running mate Collazos-Gill, earning reelection to the New Jersey General Assembly.

=== Committees ===
Committee assignments for the 2024—2025 Legislative Session are:

- Education
- Financial Institutions and Insurance

=== District 27 ===
Each of the 40 districts in the New Jersey Legislature has one representative in the New Jersey Senate and two members in the New Jersey General Assembly. The representatives from the 27th District for the 2024—2025 Legislative Session are:

- Senator John F. McKeon (D)
- Assemblywoman Rosy Bagolie (D)
- Assemblywoman Alixon Collazos-Gill (D)

== Electoral history ==
27th Legislative District General Election, 2023
Party	Candidate	Votes	%
Democratic	Rosaura Bagolie	27,303	34.9
Democratic	Alixon Collazos-Gill	27,245	34.8
Republican	Irene DeVita	11,916	15.2
Republican	Michael Mecca Jr.	11,732	15.0
Total votes		78,196	100.0
Democratic hold			
Democratic hold			
