= Alixon Collazos-Gill =

American politician (born 1977)

Member of the New Jersey General Assembly from the 27th district
- Incumbent
- Assumed office January 9, 2024 Serving with Rosy Bagolie
- Preceded by: Mila Jasey; John F. McKeon

Personal details
- Born: January 27, 1977 (age 49)
- Party: Democratic
- Education: Rutgers University–Newark
- Website: Legislative webpage

Alixon Collazos-Gill (born January 27, 1977) is an American Democratic Party politician serving as a member of the New Jersey General Assembly for the 27th legislative district, having taken office on January 9, 2024.

== Biography ==
A resident of Montclair, New Jersey, Collazos-Gill emigrated from Colombia and settled with her family in New Jersey, graduating from Long Branch High School and then Rutgers University–Newark. She worked for New Jersey Network, in the office of Congressman Steve Rothman and on Phil Murphy's campaign for governor. She and her husband established a government affairs firm, where she focuses on cannabis-related issues.

== New Jersey General Assembly ==
Following the 2021 reapportionment, all of the municipalities in Morris County were removed from the district, while the Passaic County municipality of Clifton was shifted from its longtime home in the 34th district. In the June 2023 Democratic primary, the first held under the 2021 reapportionment, incumbent Senator Richard Codey defeated incumbent 34th district Senator Nia Gill, though Codey announced in August that he would retire at the end of the term. McKeon was selected to replace Codey on the November ballot for Senate while Mila Jasey retired after her hometown was moved out of the district, with newcomers Rosy Bagolie and Collazos-Gill ultimately chosen to be the two Democratic Assembly candidates.

Bagolie and Collazos-Gill defeated Republicans Irene DeVita and Michael G. Mecca Jr. in the 2023 New Jersey General Assembly election Collazos-Gill was one of 27 members elected for the first time in 2023 to serve in the General Assembly, more than one-third of the seats.

=== Committees ===
Committee assignments for the 2024—2025 Legislative Session are:

- Children, Families and Food Security
- Environment, Natural Resources, and Solid Waste
- Regulated Professions

=== District 27 ===
Each of the 40 districts in the New Jersey Legislature has one representative in the New Jersey Senate and two members in the New Jersey General Assembly. The representatives from the 27th District for the 2024—2025 Legislative Session are:

- Senator John F. McKeon (D)
- Assemblyman Rosy Bagolie (D)
- Assemblywoman Alixon Collazos-Gill (D)

== Electoral history ==
27th Legislative District General Election, 2023
Party	Candidate	Votes	%
Democratic	Rosaura Bagolie	27,303	34.9
Democratic	Alixon Collazos-Gill	27,245	34.8
Republican	Irene DeVita	11,916	15.2
Republican	Michael Mecca Jr.	11,732	15.0
Total votes		78,196	100.0
Democratic hold			
Democratic hold			
