= Eldridge Hawkins Jr. =

American politician

Mayor of Orange, New Jersey
- In office July 1, 2008 – July 1, 2012
- Preceded by: Mims Hackett
- Succeeded by: Dwayne D. Warren

Personal details
- Born: July 25, 1979 (age 47) Livingston, New Jersey, U.S.
- Parent: Eldridge Hawkins (father)
- Education: Rider University (BA)
- Occupation: Politician

Eldridge Hawkins, Jr. (born July 25, 1979) was Mayor of Orange, New Jersey, a city of 33,000 residents in Essex County, New Jersey with an annual $53 million operating budget. As Chair of the Management Reform Committee of the N.J. League of Municipalities, Hawkins was a leader in the campaign to reform the state's civil service and arbitration laws to give cities more power in collective bargaining with public employee unions. His adversarial managing style and combative relations with the workers of Orange received national attention. After leaving municipal office, Mr. Hawkins spent several years working for the New Jersey Department of State in a Community Outreach capacity and as Director of Policy, Operations & Governmental Affairs/Legislative Liaison. Hawkins served as President of the New Jersey United States Junior Chamber of Commerce (Jaycees) and is also a law enforcement professional and businessman. In addition, he is a martial arts expert with over 30 years of experience and a member of the USA Unified Martial Arts Hall of Fame. Accordingly, Shihan Eldridge Hawkins, Jr has earned the rank of 5th Degree Black Belt in United States Ju-Jitsu, Fusion Kenpo, and 7th Degree Black Belt in American Style Nunchaku. As such, Hawkins has been recognized as a national leader in the martial arts by the United States Ju-Jitsu Federation.

== Early years ==
Eldridge Hawkins, Jr. was born in 1979 in Livingston, New Jersey, the son of Eldridge Hawkins, Civil Rights lawyer and former Assemblyman (D-Essex) and Linda Cofer Hawkins, businesswoman and civic leader. He grew up in West Orange, New Jersey attending Seton Hall Preparatory School. He then attended Rider University and received his B.A. in Business Administration in 2001. After college, he pursued dual careers in business and law enforcement. He served as Director of Operations for the Carl Lewis Fund, Inc and as a Licensed Realtor Associate. He also worked as a Private Investigator and in 2002 began his career with the West Orange Police Department. After receiving two commendations, the Essex County P.B.A. Distinguished Service Award and suffering a line of duty or service related injury, he retired as a Police Officer. He moved on to secure an additional undergraduate degree in Criminal Justice from Thomas Edison State College and a Masters of Business Administration (MBA) with a Management concentration from Seton Hall University. Additionally, he also obtained a Juris Doctor (JD) degree with a certificate in Health Care Compliance from Mitchell Hamline School of Law, formerly known as William Mitchell College of Law.

== Campaign for mayor ==
Having moved to Orange, he was preparing to run for the City Council in the May 2008 municipal elections when the incumbent mayor, Mims Hackett was indicted for bribery in a federal corruption probe. After Hackett withdrew from his re-election campaign, Hawkins decided to run for mayor instead of city council. Entering a field of candidates with much more experience in politics, municipal government and business than himself, the novice candidate promised to make Orange safer, assure honesty and integrity, and intensify redevelopment. In a city concerned about crime, his law enforcement credentials proved a big plus. Hawkins’ reform campaign won the support of State Senator and former Governor Richard Codey, Newark Mayor Cory Booker, Assemblywoman Mila Jasey and two members of the Orange City Council. On May 13, 2008, he was narrowly elected Mayor at the age of 28. The vote totals were: Eldridge Hawkins, Jr.- 1,061, Councilman Donald Page – 942, Councilwoman Tency Eason – 564, Zoning Board Chair Janice Morrell – 417, Community Activist Betty Brown – 285, and Planning Board Chair Dwight Holmes – 212.

== Governing Orange ==
Hawkins assumed office on July 1, 2008, just as the U.S. economy was entering the worst economic recession since the 1930s. His initial acts as mayor involved major improvements to the Orange Police Department. He appointed a new police director, instituted community policing, conducted gun buyback events, upgraded police technology, and established Special Police Officers. In the process, he reduced crime and restored the confidence of federal and state law enforcement agencies in the Orange Police Department. Hawkins’ second major initiative was to spur redevelopment and strengthen the city's tax base. He upgraded the city's water supply so that the state would permit increased development. He demolished the Walter G. Alexander Houses, a deteriorated high rise housing project and received state and federal funding to replace it with a neighborhood of low rise homes.

Hawkins successfully sought designation as a “Transit village”, triggering state technical and financial help for transit-oriented development around Orange's two train stations. To promote Orange as a destination for shopping, dining, and entertainment, Hawkins secured funding for the city's Valley Arts district, designated the historic Italian neighborhood as “Little Italy,” and developed a plan for the revitalization of the city's commercial corridors. To increase citizen involvement, Hawkins initiated televising and streaming video of City Council meetings, sponsored regular public forums, initiated a “Call to Service” initiative to enable ordinary citizens and not just the politically connected to serve on boards and commissions, and redesigned the city website to make it easier for citizens to communicate their concerns and get fast action.

== Public/private partnerships ==
Having promised an ambitious agenda but faced with declining revenues, Hawkins created public/private partnerships to stretch the city's tax dollars. He partnered with the St. Barnabas Health Care System to provide health care services to residents of senior citizens’ housing; recruited the Heinz Foundations to develop and finance a program of low cost prescription drugs, and created a partnership with the Profeta Urban Investment Foundation, Seton Hall University Business School and the Intersect Fund to provide technical assistance and loans to Orange entrepreneurs.

== Coping with the financial crisis ==
In the aftermath of a $3 million-dollar reduction in state aid to Orange, Hawkins sought to increase the ability of New Jersey cities to cut spending through pension and health benefit changes, civil service and collective bargaining reforms, and relief from unfunded mandates. He spoke out against Governor Chris Christie's cuts in New Jersey's Urban Enterprise Zone program. He was named as Chairman of the Management Reform Committee of the NJ League of Municipalities and led his fellow mayors in lobbying for changes in state laws. To avoid a twenty percent increase in property taxes, he was forced to lay off firefighters, police, and other city workers.

The layoffs and difficult negotiations with public employee unions received national attention as emblematic of the plight of U.S. cities and states. Fox Financial News Network focused on the implications for city and state budgets, while CNN highlighted the plight of the laid off workers. In March 2011, Orange was awarded a federal grant which helped Hawkins to negotiate an agreement with the firefighters union. The grant combined with work rule changes and other givebacks enabled the city to rehire its twelve laid-off firefighters and hire an additional twelve. This precedent-setting settlement also received national coverage.

== Losing the 2012 election ==
Hawkins faced a tough road to reelection in 2012. Challengers included sitting Councilman Edward Marable, 2008 Mayoral Candidate Janice Morrell and attorney Dwayne Warren Hawkins was narrowly beaten by Warren in what some observers called an "election shocker." Critics pointed to Hawkins' management style as being one reason for his loss. Another major factor was a $100,000 campaign of mailings, television commercials and paid canvassers by several public employee unions, who opposed Hawkins' advocacy of higher pension and health benefit payments by government workers. After the 2012 election, Hawkins founded Black Belt Security & Investigations, LLC, a private security firm located in East Orange, NJ. As a former Mayor and security expert, Hawkins participated in television and radio discussions of school violence and gun control in January 2013. Appearing on New York City's Fox5 TV and WWOR TV as well as radio station WGHT Hot 97, Hawkins advocated for the controversial position of placing armed guards in schools and urged a "moderate" approach to gun control.

== Martial Arts Background ==
Eldridge Hawkins, Jr. began his training in Chinese Kenpo-Kung Fu as a youth and made Black Belt in June 2001 under now Professor Harry Baker, 10th Dan. Under Professors Baker & Ibrahim Sharif, Hawkins holds Black Belt rank in Fusion Kenpo, and Chinese Kenpo Kung Fu. Here, Hawkins’ martial arts lineage runs through his teachers to Grand Masters Ed Parker & Kalaii Kano Griffin, as well as Professors Moses Powell & Ronald Duncan. Hawkins also has recognized rank in Kenpo-Jujitsu and United States Ju-Jitsu under the United States Ju-Jitsu Federation (USJJF). Hawkins specializes in various martial arts weapons and is a 7th Degree Black Belt in the tournament system American Style Nunchaku (ASN) founded by Grandmaster Michael Burke. See https://www.asnfederation.com/ Accordingly, Hawkins, is a certified rank instructor for the “American Style Nunchaku Federation” (ASNF) and Is also certified by the United States Martial Arts Federation (USMAF). Hawkins is also founder of the Ken-Fu Nunchaku Jutsu self-defense system and teaches ASNF tournament forms/katas Nunchaku through an online platform www.VirtualNunchaku.com. In 2022 Hawkins was inducted as member of the USA Unified Martial Arts Hall of Fame. A more complete martial arts biography for Shihan Eldridge Hawkins, Jr can be found at https://www.usjjf.org/eldridge-hawkins.html .

== Honors and affiliations ==
- World Martial Arts Federation Hall of Fame Member - 2026 Inductee
- United States Martial Arts Federation Hall of Fame Member - National Kobudo Sensei
- United States Ju Jitsu Federation Hall of Fame Member - National Ju Jitsu Sensei
- Senior Instructor - Baker's Red Iron Dragon Fusion Kenpo Academy
- Vice President - United States Martial Arts Federation
- Vice President (US Operations) - American Style Nunchaku Federation
- 1st Place Champion – Adult Division, Black Belt Weapons; Upland Martial Arts (Open Tournament).
- 2nd Place Winner – Free Fighting Division, Black Belt Men Over 200 Lbs.; Challenge of Champions XII (Open Tournament).
- Life Member – New Jersey Police Honor Legion
- President of the New Jersey Junior Chamber of Commerce (Jaycees) and founder of the Orange-Essex Jaycees, the first chapter in a New Jersey urban community
- Member, 2012 Congressional Redistricting Commission (Hawkins was appointed but then removed before redistricting began).
- Selected by Ebony Magazine in 2009 as an “Outstanding Young American Leader.”
- Member, Phi Beta Sigma fraternity
- Chairman, Orange Democratic Committee.
- Member, Maplewood & Oranges Chapter, NAACP.
- Master Mason, Bethel Lodge No. 10, F & AM - PHA Orange, NJ
- Youth Role Model Award – National Association of Negro Business & Professional Women's Clubs, Inc.

== Articles and publications ==
- . Official Municipal Accomplishments of Eldridge Hawkins, Jr.
- “Orange attracting shoppers and keeping businesses downtown”. NJ Municipalities. NJ League of Municipalities January 2010. Accessed March 25, 2011
- “New development turns Orange into green”. Enterprise Magazine, NJ Chamber of Commerce, October 2010. Accessed March 25, 2011
- “The towns need more powers on arbitration and civil service”. Orange Transcript November 2, 2010. Accessed March 25, 2011
- "Innovation continues in Orange”. NJ Municipalities NJ League of Municipalities December 2010. Accessed March 25, 2011
- . Election shocker in Orange: Mayor ousted after first term despite fierce re-election campaign
- . Orange Mayor Eldridge Hawkins fighting crime, but also battling critics and lawsuits
- . Essex County election results: Montclair, Orange get new mayors
- . Winners and Losers: Municipal Elections Edition
- . "Official Website of Eldridge Hawkins, Jr.
