= Cavicchia =

Cavicchia is a surname. Notable people with the surname include:

- Dominic A. Cavicchia (1901–1983), American politician, brother of Peter
- Peter A. Cavicchia (1879–1967), American politician
- Mark Cavicchia, American entrepreneur, founder of WhereverTV
