= Orechio =

Orechio is a surname. Notable people with the surname include:

- Carl Orechio (1914–1991), American politician
- Carmen A. Orechio (1926–2018), American politician
