= Mayor of Orange, New Jersey =

Orange, New Jersey is governed within the Faulkner Act, formally known as the Optional Municipal Charter Law, under the Mayor-Council form of municipal government, with a directly elected mayor and a City Council consisting of four ward representatives and three at-large representatives. Councilmembers are elected to serve four-year terms of office in non-partisan elections on a staggered basis with the four ward seats and the three at-large seats coming up for election on an alternating cycle every two years.

== Mayors ==
- Dwayne D. Warren, 2012 to Present
- Eldridge Hawkins Jr. 2008 to 2012
- Mims Hackett 1996 to 2008
- Robert L. Brown 1988 to 1996, the city's first African-American mayor
- Paul Monacelli (1984–88).
- Joel L. Shain (1970–1974; 1980–84)
- Russell A. Riley
- Joseph Promollo
- William Howe Davis, 1942 to 1954.
- Ovid C. Bianchi (July 1, 1938 - June 30, 1942).
- Daniel Francis Minahan .
- Arthur Browne Seymour, 1908 to 1912
- George Huntington Hartford, 1878 to 1890.
