= A. J. Sabath =

American politician

Commissioner of Labor and Workforce Development in New Jersey
- In office October 2005 – January 2006

A.J. Sabath is the former Commissioner of Labor and Workforce Development in New Jersey. He served in the position from October 2005 to January 2006.

Commissioner Sabath was a longtime political aide and labor policy advisor to Democrats in the New Jersey Senate. In November 2004, former Gov. Richard Codey named Sabath as the Deputy Commissioner of Labor and Workforce Development, before promoting him to commissioner.

After leaving the Governor's Office and returning to being the full-time President of the New Jersey Senate, Codey named Sabath as Chief of Staff to the Senate President. Sabath announced in February 2009 that he would leave the chief of staff job on March 1, 2009, to form his own government affairs firm.

Sabath serves as the Vice Chairman of the Board of Trustees of Ramapo College and as a member of the State Board of Examiners for Master Plumbers.
