= James Davy =

American politician (born 1953)

Commissioner of Human Services in New Jersey

Personal details
- Born: May 6, 1953 (age 73) Philadelphia, Pennsylvania, U.S.

James Davy (born May 6, 1953) is the former Commissioner of Human Services in New Jersey, holding the position under former Governors James McGreevey and Jon Corzine. He previously served on McGreevey's staff in the governor's office and while McGreevey was Mayor of Woodbridge Township.

Born May 6, 1953, in Philadelphia, he was raised in Pittsburgh and graduated in 1971 from North Allegheny Senior High School. He earned an undergraduate degree from Thiel College and a master's in public administration from the Maxwell School of Citizenship and Public Affairs.

On September 9, 2005, then Governor of New Jersey Richard Codey named his wife, Lucille Davy, as Acting Commissioner of Education. In doing so, they became the first husband and wife to serve in a state cabinet together in the country. They reside in Pennington, New Jersey.
