= William Howe Davis =

American politician

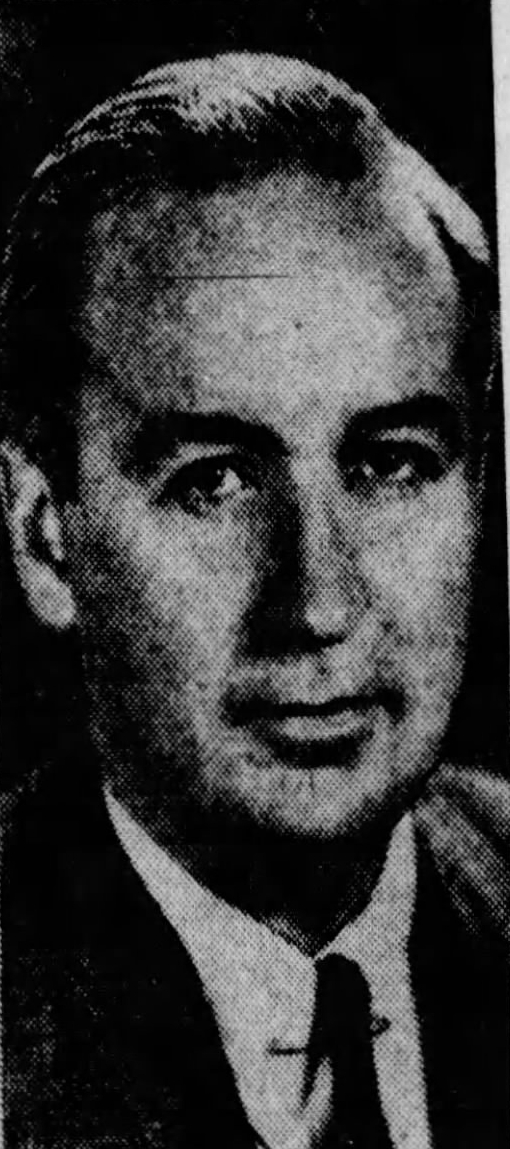
- Davis in 1954

1st Mayor of Orange, New Jersey
- In office July 1942 – March 1954
- Preceded by: Ovid C. Bianchi
- Succeeded by: Russell A. Riley

Director of the New Jersey Division of Alcoholic Beverage Control
- In office February 1954 – January 1963
- Preceded by: Dominic A. Cavicchia
- Succeeded by: Joseph P. Lordi

Personal details
- Born: March 8, 1904 Orange, New Jersey, U.S.
- Died: August 18, 1982 (aged 81) Newark, New Jersey, U.S.
- Party: Democratic
- Spouse: Ruth Shanley
- Relations: Bernard M. Shanley (brother-in-law)
- Parent: Judge Thomas A. Davis
- Education: New Jersey Law School

William Howe Davis (March 8, 1904 – August 18, 1982) was an American Democratic Party politician who served as Mayor of Orange, New Jersey, for 12 years. He was the Director of the New Jersey Division of Alcoholic Beverage Control beginning in 1954 during the Administration of Governor Robert B. Meyner and as the first head of the state's Amusement Games Commission, starting in 1960.

== Early life ==
Davis was born in Orange on March 8, 1904. He was the son of Thomas A. Davis, who served as an Orange City Councilman, as South Orange Village Attorney, and as a Judge of the Essex County Court. His grandfather, Michael Davis (1833–1908) served as an Alderman in Orange and on the Essex County Board of Chosen Freeholders. Davis was a graduate of Carteret Academy, Seton Hall College (now known as Seton Hall University) and New Jersey Law School (now Rutgers School of Law – Newark) in 1928, the same year that he was admitted to the state bar.

== Political career ==
Davis was elected Mayor of Orange in 1942, and was re-elected in 1946 and 1950. He resigned in 1954 after Governor Robert B. Meyner appointed him to serve as the Director of the New Jersey Division of Alcoholic Beverage Control. In response to a request from a bar owner in Atlantic City, New Jersey, who was asking to be able to open a "self-service tavern", Davis issued an opinion in 1954 forbidding the sale of alcoholic beverages using a vending machine, arguing that "I have not yet heard of a machine that can say 'no' to a minor or a drunk or any other who should not be served."

In December 1959, Davis made clear that he was looking to take on the role of regulating the state's amusement games, after being nominated for the position by Governor of New Jersey Robert B. Meyner, even though he would see no additional compensation beyond the $18,000 he already earned; David emphasized that the Alcoholic Beverage Control division had field offices in Asbury Park and Atlantic City, two of New Jersey's major seaside resorts, where most of the gaming machines were located, and that handling both jobs would result in a significant savings to the state. Confirmed by the New Jersey Senate in February 1960 to become the first head of the state's Amusement Games Commission, Howe was given what Billboard magazine described as a "powerful" role to "lay down any rulings he sees fit" in a market that was at the time one of the nation's largest for coin-operated amusement games as the country's major summertime seashore resort area. He held the post heading the Division of Alcoholic Beverage Control until 1963. In 1961, Governor Meyner nominated Davis to be a judge in the New Jersey Superior Court, but the state senate refused to confirm Davis, with several senators stating that Davis was too strict. Davis had announced in December 1962 that he was resigning from both positions, which had been combined into one by the state, due to financial concerns and would be joining the law firm of Shanley & Fisher, which would absorb his former firm and make it into the new firm's Orange office.

He died on August 18, 1982, in Newark, New Jersey.

== Family ==
He was married in June 1937 to the former Ruth Bayley Shanley (1913–2004), the brother of Bernard M. Shanley, the Deputy White House Chief of Staff under President Dwight Eisenhower. They had five sons.
