= Mary Jo Codey =

American healthcare activist and First Lady of New Jersey

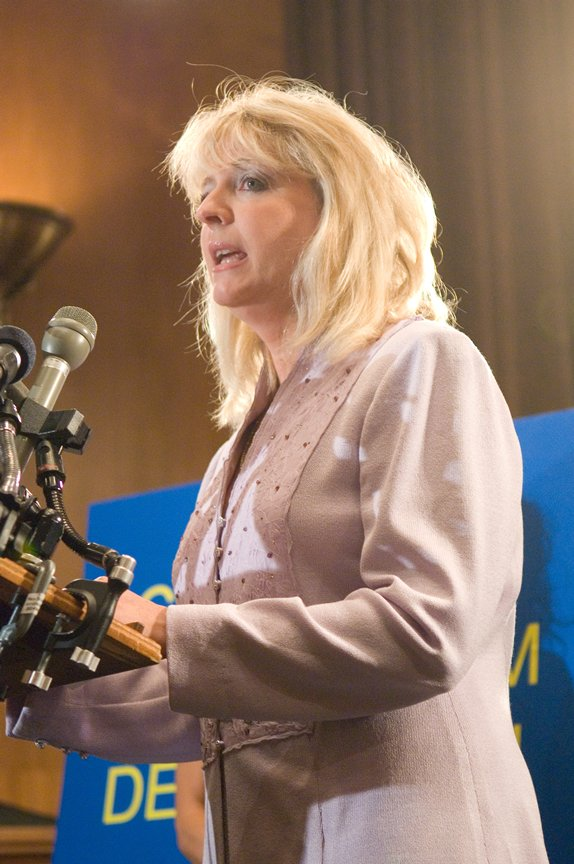
- Codey in 2007

First Lady of New Jersey
- In role November 15, 2004 – January 17, 2006
- Governor: Richard Codey
- Preceded by: Dina Matos
- Succeeded by: Mary Pat Christie (2010)
- Acted in role January 12, 2002 – January 15, 2002
- Preceded by: Peg Bennett
- Succeeded by: Dina Matos

Personal details
- Born: Mary Jo Rolli; August 14, 1955 (age 70) Glen Ridge, New Jersey, U.S.
- Spouse: Richard Codey (m. 1981; died 2026)
- Occupation: Teacher

Mary Jo Codey (née Rolli; born August 14, 1955) is an American healthcare activist and former First Lady of New Jersey. She served her tenure as First Lady while her husband, Governor Richard Codey, served from November 16, 2004 to January 17, 2006.

== Early life ==
Codey was born Mary Jo Rolli in Glen Ridge, New Jersey, she grew up in West Orange. She attended Caldwell College, where she received a Bachelor of Arts degree in elementary education. She then earned a Master of Arts degree in elementary education, with certification as a Learning Disabilities Teacher Consultant (LDTC), from Seton Hall University.

== Career ==
Codey became First Lady upon her husband's succession to the governors office, after former Governor Jim McGreevey resigned. She continued teaching school part time during her service. As First Lady, she was known for her work in mental health, postpartum depression and breast cancer.

== Personal life ==
She married Richard Codey in 1981.

She suffered from postpartum depression following the birth of her oldest son. She said she did not get over it until a year after her son's birth. She controlled the illness with medication, which she stopped using during her second pregnancy. To combat the depression during her pregnancy she underwent electroshock therapy. She received electroshock again while suffering from breast cancer.

Codey and her family live in Roseland, New Jersey and she currently teaches at a private elementary school. She has said that while she enjoyed the opportunity to be First Lady and to advocate for causes she believed in, she was looking forward to her husband leaving office in order to return to being a private citizen.

Preceded by Peg Bennett	Acting First Lady of New Jersey; January 12, 2002 – January 15, 2002	Succeeded by Dina Matos McGreevey
Preceded by Dina Matos	First Lady of New Jersey; November 15, 2004 – January 17, 2006	Succeeded by Mary Pat Christie
