= Stephanie R. Bush =

American politician

Commissioner of the New Jersey Department of Community Affairs
- In office September 22, 1992 – January 18, 1994
- Governor: James Florio
- Preceded by: Randy Primas
- Succeeded by: Harriet E. Derman

Member of the New Jersey General Assembly from the 27th district
- In office January 12, 1988 – September 21, 1992
- Preceded by: Mildred Barry Garvin
- Succeeded by: Quilla E. Talmadge

Personal details
- Born: March 16, 1953 (age 73) East Orange, New Jersey
- Party: Democratic
- Education: Cornell University; American University; Rutgers University
- Occupation: Lawyer

Stephanie Regina Bush-Baskette (born March 16, 1953), also known as Stephanie R. Bush, is an American attorney and Democratic Party politician from New Jersey who served in the New Jersey General Assembly representing the 27th district from 1988 to 1992.

== Biography ==
Bush was born in East Orange in 1953. She graduated from East Orange High School and received a baccalaureate degree in psychology from Cornell University. She later received a J.D. degree from American University and became a principal at a firm in East Orange. She had also been the president of the New Jersey Association of Black Women Lawyers and served on the East Orange Zoning Board of Adjustment.

In 1987, the Essex County Democratic Party Organization selected Bush to have the Organization line in that year's General Assembly primary ballot alongside Harry A. McEnroe after dropping incumbent Mildred Barry Garvin. They won in the primary and went onto win the general election. While in the Assembly, Bush sponsored the state's Family Leave Act and a raise in the state's minimum wage. She subsequently won reelection to the Assembly in 1989 and 1991. On September 21, 1992, Governor James Florio named Bush to be the Commissioner of the New Jersey Department of Community Affairs.

After leaving the Department of Community Affairs, Bush earned a PhD from Rutgers University in criminal justice. She later taught at Rutgers University–Newark as a professor in metropolitan studies. As of 2019, she is the business administrator for the City of Bridgeton.
