= Dina Matos =

Former First Lady of New Jersey (born 1966)

First Lady of New Jersey
- In role January 15, 2002 – November 15, 2004
- Governor: Jim McGreevey
- Preceded by: Diane DiFrancesco
- Succeeded by: Mary Jo Codey

Personal details
- Born: November 5, 1966 (age 60) Cantanhede, Portugal
- Spouse(s): Jim McGreevey (m. 2000; div. 2008) Paul Zuccarino (m. 2018)
- Children: 1
- Education: Rutgers University–Newark (attended)

Dina Matos (born November 5, 1966) is a former First Lady of New Jersey. She served as first lady during the administration of her then-husband, New Jersey Governor Jim McGreevey. McGreevey was elected governor of New Jersey in 2001. At an August 2004 press conference, McGreevey—with Matos at his side—stated that he was gay, that he had engaged in an affair with a man, and that he was resigning from office. Matos and McGreevey began living apart in November 2004, the same month McGreevey left office. A divorce was granted on August 8, 2008. Matos published a book entitled Silent Partner: A Memoir of My Marriage in 2007.

== Early life and education ==
Matos is the daughter of Maria and Ricardo Matos. They moved to the United States from Portugal when she was still young and settled in the heavily Portuguese Ironbound section of Newark. Maria worked in a gift shop, and Ricardo worked for the railroad.

After graduating from East Side High School, Matos enrolled at the Newark campus of Rutgers University in 1984. She majored in political science and also worked as a secretary while in college. Matos was enrolled in college until 1991. As of 2004, she had not received a degree.

== Personal life ==
Matos met Jim McGreevey in 1996 when he was mayor of Woodbridge Township, New Jersey. Matos began dating McGreevey the following year, shortly after he lost his first bid for governor to Christine Todd Whitman. McGreevey had separated from his first wife, Kari Schutz, in 1995 and was divorced in 1997. Matos married McGreevey in 2000, and McGreevey was elected governor of New Jersey in 2001. Together, Matos and McGreevey have a daughter, Jacqueline, who was born in 2001.

McGreevey was accompanied by Matos at a nationally televised August 2004 press conference in which he identified himself as a gay man, stated that he had engaged in an affair with another man, and announced that he would resign from office. McGreevey left office in November 2004. Matos and McGreevey began living apart that same month. The couple legally separated on January 12, 2007, and McGreevey filed for divorce in July 2007. The Matos–McGreevey divorce and custody battle gained much media attention in New Jersey. Both parents sought full custody of their daughter, and Matos sought alimony. The divorce was finalized on August 8, 2008, and Matos received joint custody and child support.

Matos announced in January 2007 that she was writing a book to end media speculation on her life. In the book, Matos wrote that she would never have married McGreevey or had a child with him if she had known he was gay. Her book, Silent Partner: A Memoir of My Marriage, was published on May 1, 2007. That day, Matos broke her silence and spoke on The Oprah Winfrey Show. In that interview, recalling the day when McGreevey announced his alleged affair at a press conference, Matos said: "I smiled because I didn't want to break down" and added that McGreevey had told her that she had to "be Jackie Kennedy". Matos said, "I'm thinking, Jackie Kennedy? Her husband was murdered. You cheated on me and I have to be Jackie Kennedy"?

On May 2, 2007, Matos appeared on ABC's Good Morning America with Diane Sawyer and stated:

I thought I had it all, I thought it was the American dream, and it turned out to be a nightmare. ... You know he had the entire day [that he resigned] scripted. His entire life had been choreographed, and even as his world was falling apart, he was still trying to script everything and making sure that day went as he wanted it.

Matos married Paul Zuccarino in 2018.

== Career ==
Matos was the first lady of New Jersey during McGreevey's tenure in office, from 2002 to 2004. She has previously served as executive director of the Columbus Hospital Foundation in Newark, New Jersey. Since 2009, she has served as executive director of CARES Foundation, an organization for individuals with congenital adrenal hyperplasia.

== Other endeavors ==
Matos speaks fluent Portuguese and has worked to obtain green cards and naturalization for Portuguese immigrants. In June 2004, she was grand marshal of the Portugal Day parade in Newark.

Matos's book, Silent Partner: A Memoir of My Marriage, was published on May 1, 2007.

Preceded by Diane DiFrancesco	First Lady of New Jersey; January 2002 – November 2004	Succeeded by Mary Jo Codey
