= LeRoy J. Jones Jr. =

American politician (born 1957)

LeRoy Jones

Chair of the New Jersey Democratic Party
- Incumbent
- Assumed office June 17, 2021
- Preceded by: John Currie

Member of the New Jersey General Assembly from the 27th district
- In office January 11, 1994 – January 8, 2002
- Preceded by: Robert Brown; Quilla Talmadge
- Succeeded by: Mims Hackett; John F. McKeon

Personal details
- Born: September 5, 1957 (age 69) Orange, New Jersey, U.S.
- Party: Democratic
- Education: Seton Hall University (BS); New Jersey Institute of Technology (MBA)

LeRoy J. Jones Jr. (born September 5, 1957) is an American politician who served four terms in the New Jersey General Assembly, where he represented the 27th Legislative District. He currently serves as Chair of the New Jersey Democratic Party, as well as the Democratic Party chair for both East Orange and Essex County, New Jersey. He is also a partner at 1868 Public Affairs, a government and public affairs consultancy.

== Early life and education ==
Jones received his undergraduate degree from Seton Hall University, with a major in accounting. He earned a master's degree in business management from the New Jersey Institute of Technology.

== Career ==
=== Early career ===
Jones served as the City Administrator of East Orange, New Jersey for seven years, where he was responsible for developing the city's $100 million operating budget. Jones also served in various positions at Public Service Electric and Gas, including Business Development Manager, Director of Workforce Diversity and Public Affairs Manager.

Jones is currently a founding partner of 1868 Public Affairs a full-service government and public affairs consultancy with offices in Trenton, New Jersey

Jones served two terms on the Board of Chosen Freeholders for Essex County from 1988 to 1993. and four-terms in the New Jersey General Assembly, where he represented the 27th Legislative District from 1994 to 2000. As a member of the New Jersey General Assembly, Jones served on the Solid and Hazardous Waste Committee and was Deputy Minority Leader from 1996 to 1998. He was first elected in 1993 along with Nia Gill, and the pair won re-election in 1995, 1997 and 1999.

Seeking to make the unavailable as a weapon by youths, Jones proposed legislation in the Assembly in 1995 that would ban the sale of box cutters to those under 18 years old, with a fine of up to $7,000 and 18 months in jail imposed on those violating the ban. In 1998, Jones proposed legislation that would require children up to the age of 14 to wear ski helmets and would require ski areas to make them available for use by all underage skiers.

=== Politics ===
In May 1998, Jones and Senator Shirley Turner requested Senate President Donald DiFrancesco and Assembly Speaker Jack Collins to impanel a bicameral legislative task force to review the issue of racial profiling. Their request was denied. Later that month, Assemblyman Jones and Senator Turner introduced legislation to create a joint legislative task force to hold public hearings to investigate racial profiling and minority employment discrimination within the New Jersey State Police. Jones said, "If you know something is wrong... you are duty bound to challenge that procedure, particularly when you know it is wrong," he said.

In August 1999, LeRoy Jones Jr. was one of fifteen Assembly members and five state senators who made up the "New Jersey Legislative Black and Latino Caucus". On April 13, 20 and 27, 1999, the Caucus held regional public hearings - in Trenton, Newark and Blackwood and in August 1999 produce a report titled, "A Report on Discriminatory Practices Within the New Jersey State Police". In preparation for the hearings, the Caucus established a toll-free telephone number to enable the public to report incidents of abuse of power by the State Police. Hundreds of telephone calls were received from persons who were either victims of, or witnesses to racial profiling.

Redistricting following the 2000 United States census put both Gill and Jones in the 34th Legislative District. In 2001, Jones unsuccessfully ran for Mayor of East Orange. In the 2003 primaries for the district's seat in the New Jersey Senate, Jones was given the party line opposing Gill. Despite outspending Gill in the heavily Democratic district, Gill won with 55% of the vote.

Jones is the Democratic Chairman of both East Orange and Essex County. In 2002, Jones was elected to serve as the East Orange Democratic Municipal Committee Chairman which is a position he still holds today. In October 2013, Jones was elected as Essex County Democratic Chairman, following the death of Phil Thigpen. Jones served as the Essex County Campaign Director for Governor Jon Corzine's 2009 re-election campaign, where he helped lead Governor Corzine to one the largest Democratic vote pluralities in the history of New Jersey. He also served as Co-Campaign Chairman for Essex County Executive Joseph DiVincenzo.

In 2012, Jones was appointed by New Jersey Assembly Speaker Sheila Oliver as a Commissioner of the New Jersey Sports and Exposition Authority.

In June 2021, Jones was elected Chair of the New Jersey Democratic State Committee, replacing John Currie. He was re-elected to serve a full two-year term in January 2022.

==== Controversy ====
In June 2015, Jones was charged with misdemeanor simple assault after allegedly punching a poll worker on primary election day in June, in an incident that was recorded on video. Jones stated that he had come down to the polling place to confront the poll worker, who had been in an argument with Jones' wife, who was also there as a poll worker at that location. But Jones had an explanation. 'This man threatened my wife,' Jones said. 'This man assaulted my wife. This man charged at my wife.'"

== Personal life ==
Jones lives in East Orange with his wife, Jacqueline and their children.

Party political offices
Preceded by John Currie	Chair of the New Jersey Democratic Party; 2021–present	Incumbent
