= New Jersey's 27th legislative district =

American legislative district

- Senator: John F. McKeon (D)
- Assembly members: Rosy Bagolie (D); Alixon Collazos-Gill (D)
- Registration: 43.7% Democratic; 20.4% Republican; 35.4% unaffiliated
- Demographics: 61.7% White; 12.9% Black/African American; 0.2% Native American; 13.1% Asian; 0.0% Hawaiian/Pacific Islander; 4.1% Other race; 8.0% Two or more races; 10.0% Hispanic
- Population: 233,779
- Voting-age population: 180,070
- Registered voters: 189,871

New Jersey's 27th legislative district is one of 40 in the New Jersey Legislature. The district includes the Essex municipalities of Livingston, Millburn, Roseland, Montclair, and West Orange; and the Passaic County municipality of Clifton.

== Demographic characteristics ==
As of the 2020 United States census, the district had a population of 233,779, of whom 180,070 (77.0%) were of voting age. The racial makeup of the district was 144,266 (61.7%) White, 30,118 (12.9%) African American, 521 (0.2%) Native American, 30,448 (13.0%) Asian, 76 (0.0%) Pacific Islander, 9,681 (4.1%) from some other race, and 18,669 (8.0%) from two or more races. Hispanic or Latino of any race were 23,424 (10.0%) of the population.

The 27th district had 189,871 registered voters as of December 1, 2021, of whom 67,129 (35.4%) were registered as unaffiliated, 82,983 (43.7%) were registered as Democrats, 38,706 (20.4%) were registered as Republicans, and 1,053 (0.6%) were registered to other parties.

The district includes a number of comparatively wealthy communities in Western Essex County, as well as a number of relatively poor areas close to Newark. The 27th district had one of the lowest percentages in the state of registered Republicans, with Democrats outnumbering Republicans by a more than 2–1 margin.

== Political representation ==
For the 2026–2027 session, the 27th legislative district of the New Jersey Legislature is represented in the State Senate by John F. McKeon (D, West Orange) and in the General Assembly by Rosy Bagolie (D, Livingston) and Alixon Collazos-Gill (D, Montclair).

The legislative district overlaps with 10th and 11th congressional districts.

== Apportionment history ==
In the original creation of the 40-district legislative map in 1973, the 27th district consisted of the northern Essex County municipalities of Nutley, Bloomfield, Glen Ridge, Montclair, Cedar Grove, Verona, Caldwell, and Essex Fells. For the 1981 redistricting, the 27th consisted of the four municipalities of The Oranges: South Orange, West Orange, Orange, and East Orange and a small sliver of the North Ward of Newark. In the next redistricting in 1991, Montclair was added to the district and some Newark wards were removed. With declining population through western Essex County, most of that side of the county made up the 27th district following the 2001 redistricting including Maplewood, Livingston, Fairfield Township, and The Caldwells. East Orange and the portions of the North Ward of Newark were removed but a small portion of Upper Vailsburg, Newark was included in the district this decade.

Changes to the district made as part of the New Jersey Legislative reapportionment in 2011 removed the district's share of Newark while adding Millburn in Essex County, and the Republican-leaning Morris County municipalities of Chatham Township, East Hanover, Florham Park, Hanover Township, Harding Township and Madison. This made the district slightly more Republican than its predecessor. Shifted out of the district were Fairfield Township, North Caldwell and West Caldwell (to the 26th district) and Orange (to the 34th district).

Following the reapportionment in 2021, all of the municipalities in Morris County were removed from the district, while the Passaic County municipality of Clifton was shifted from its longtime home in the 34th district. Montclair was shifted to the district for the first time since 2001. In the 2023 elections, the first held under the 2021 reapportionment, incumbent Senator Richard Codey defeated incumbent 34th district Senator Nia Gill in the Democratic primary. However in August, Codey announced his retirement at the end of the term. Assemblyman John McKeon was selected to replace Codey on the November ballot while Livingston councilwoman Rosy Bagolie replaced McKeon as a Democratic nominee for Assembly. Original primary winner Alixon Collazos-Gill planned to drop out as well in August with her husband, Essex County Commissioner Brendan Gill, expected to replace her, but she reversed her decision later that month. Both women won the general election.

== Election history ==
Session	Senate	General Assembly	
1974–1975	Carmen A. Orechio (D)	Robert M. Ruane (D)	Carl Orechio (R)
1976–1977	Carmen A. Orechio (D)	John N. Dennis (R)	Carl Orechio (R)
1978–1979	Carmen A. Orechio (D)	Buddy Fortunato (D)	Carl Orechio (R)
1980–1981	Carmen A. Orechio (D)	Buddy Fortunato (D)	Carl Orechio (R)
1982–1983	Richard Codey (D)	Mildred Barry Garvin (D)	Harry A. McEnroe (D)
1984–1985	Richard Codey (D)	Mildred Barry Garvin (D)	Harry A. McEnroe (D)
1986–1987	Richard Codey (D)	Mildred Barry Garvin (D)	Harry A. McEnroe (D)
1988–1989	Richard Codey (D)	Stephanie R. Bush (D)	Harry A. McEnroe (D)
1990–1991	Richard Codey (D)	Stephanie R. Bush (D)	Harry A. McEnroe (D)
1992–1993	Richard Codey (D)	Stephanie R. Bush (D) (Note: Resigned September 21, 1992 to become a Department of Community Affairs commissioner)	Robert L. Brown (D)
1992–1993	Richard Codey (D)	Quilla E. Talmadge (D) (Note: Appointed to the Assembly on October 15, 1992)	Robert L. Brown (D)
1994–1995	Richard Codey (D)	Nia Gill (D)	LeRoy J. Jones Jr. (D)
1996–1997	Richard Codey (D)	Nia Gill (D)	LeRoy J. Jones Jr. (D)
1998–1999	Richard Codey (D)	Nia Gill (D)	LeRoy J. Jones Jr. (D)
2000–2001	Richard Codey (D)	Nia Gill (D)	LeRoy J. Jones Jr. (D)
2002–2003	Richard Codey (D)	Mims Hackett (D)	John F. McKeon (D)
2004–2005	Richard Codey (D)	Mims Hackett (D)	John F. McKeon (D)
2006–2007	Richard Codey (D)	Mims Hackett (D) (Note: Resigned September 10, 2007)	John F. McKeon (D)
2006–2007	Richard Codey (D)	Mila Jasey (D) (Note: Appointed to the Assembly on November 8, 2007)	John F. McKeon (D)
2008–2009	Richard Codey (D)	Mila Jasey (D)	John F. McKeon (D)
2010–2011	Richard Codey (D)	Mila Jasey (D)	John F. McKeon (D)
2012–2013	Richard Codey (D)	Mila Jasey (D)	John F. McKeon (D)
2014–2015	Richard Codey (D)	Mila Jasey (D)	John F. McKeon (D)
2016–2017	Richard Codey (D)	Mila Jasey (D)	John F. McKeon (D)
2018–2019	Richard Codey (D)	Mila Jasey (D)	John F. McKeon (D)
2020–2021	Richard Codey (D)	Mila Jasey (D)	John F. McKeon (D)
2022–2023	Richard Codey (D)	Mila Jasey (D)	John F. McKeon (D)
2024–2025	John F. McKeon (D)	Rosy Bagolie (D)	Alixon Collazos-Gill (D)
2026–2027	John F. McKeon (D)	Rosy Bagolie (D)	Alixon Collazos-Gill (D)

== Election results ==
=== Senate ===
2021 New Jersey general election
Party	Candidate	Votes	%	±%
Democratic	Richard Codey	50,604	64.9	▼4.8
Republican	Adam Kraemer	27,409	35.1	▲4.8
Total votes		78,013	100.0	

New Jersey general election, 2017
Party	Candidate	Votes	%	±%
Democratic	Richard Codey	43,066	69.7	▲10.4
Republican	Pasquale Capozzoli	18,720	30.3	▼10.4
Total votes		61,786	100.0	

New Jersey general election, 2013
Party	Candidate	Votes	%	±%
Democratic	Richard Codey	34,291	59.3	▼2.5
Republican	Lee S. Holtzman	23,581	40.7	▲2.5
Total votes		57,872	100.0	

2011 New Jersey general election
Party	Candidate	Votes	%
Democratic	Richard Codey	27,089	61.8
Republican	William H. Eames	16,741	38.2
Total votes		43,830	100.0

2007 New Jersey general election
Party	Candidate	Votes	%	±%
Democratic	Richard Codey	23,631	78.8	▲13.0
Republican	Joseph A. Fischer	6,368	21.2	▼13.0
Total votes		29,999	100.0	

2003 New Jersey general election
Party	Candidate	Votes	%	±%
Democratic	Richard Codey	17,220	65.8	▲1.1
Republican	Bobbi Joan Bennett	8,958	34.2	▲1.4
Total votes		26,178	100.0	

2001 New Jersey general election
Party	Candidate	Votes	%
Democratic	Richard Codey	35,237	64.7
Republican	Jared Silverman	17,871	32.8
African-Americans For Justice	Donald Page	1,359	2.5
Total votes		54,467	100.0

1997 New Jersey general election
Party	Candidate	Votes	%	±%
Democratic	Richard Codey	35,770	79.5	▲4.4
Republican	Richard R. Klattenberg	9,250	20.5	▼4.4
Total votes		45,020	100.0	

1993 New Jersey general election
Party	Candidate	Votes	%	±%
Democratic	Richard Codey	33,138	75.1	▲7.0
Republican	Dr. Zal Velez	10,979	24.9	▼7.0
Total votes		44,117	100.0	

1991 New Jersey general election
Party	Candidate	Votes	%
Democratic	Richard Codey	19,677	68.1
Republican	Eugene J. Byrne	9,202	31.9
Total votes		28,879	100.0

1987 New Jersey general election
Party	Candidate	Votes	%	±%
Democratic	Richard Codey	17,064	76.4	▲1.2
Republican	Felix (Phil) Graziano	5,270	23.6	▼1.2
Total votes		22,334	100.0	

1983 New Jersey general election
Party	Candidate	Votes	%	±%
Democratic	Richard Codey	18,943	75.2	▲1.3
Republican	James J. Brown	6,255	24.8	▼1.3
Total votes		25,198	100.0	

1981 New Jersey general election
Party	Candidate	Votes	%
Democratic	Richard Codey	30,403	73.9
Republican	Richard E. Koehler	10,737	26.1
Total votes		41,140	100.0

1977 New Jersey general election
Party	Candidate	Votes	%	±%
Democratic	Carmen A. Orechio	25,773	50.9	▼2.2
Republican	John N. Dennis	24,855	49.1	▲2.2
Total votes		50,628	100.0	

1973 New Jersey general election
Party	Candidate	Votes	%
Democratic	Carmen Orechio	29,878	53.1
Republican	Michael A. Giuliano	26,395	46.9
Total votes		56,273	100.0

=== General Assembly ===
2021 New Jersey general election
Party	Candidate	Votes	%	±%
Democratic	John F. McKeon	48,489	31.6	▼1.4
Democratic	Mila M. Jasey	47,461	30.9	▼1.1
Republican	Kevin Ryan	28,983	18.9	▲1.3
Republican	Jonathan Sym	28,419	18.5	▲1.1
Total votes		153,352	100.0	

2019 New Jersey general election
Party	Candidate	Votes	%	±%
Democratic	John F. McKeon	27,787	33.0	▼0.4
Democratic	Mila M. Jasey	26,987	32.0	▼0.2
Republican	Michael Dailey	14,816	17.6	▲0.3
Republican	Mauro G. Tucci Jr.	14,706	17.4	▲0.2
Total votes		84,296	100.0	

New Jersey general election, 2017
Party	Candidate	Votes	%	±%
Democratic	John F. McKeon	39,742	33.4	▲4.0
Democratic	Mila M. Jasey	38,311	32.2	▲4.6
Republican	Ronald DeRose	20,625	17.3	▼4.0
Republican	Angelo Tedesco Jr.	20,451	17.2	▼2.7
Total votes		119,129	100.0	

New Jersey general election, 2015
Party	Candidate	Votes	%	±%
Democratic	John F. McKeon	19,128	29.4	▲1.6
Democratic	Mila M. Jasey	17,971	27.6	▲0.9
Republican	Wonkyu “Q” Rim	13,896	21.3	▼1.8
Republican	Tayfun Selen	12,957	19.9	▼2.6
Libertarian	Jeff Hetrick	616	0.9	N/A
Libertarian	Damien Caillault	564	0.9	N/A
Total votes		65,132	100.0	

New Jersey general election, 2013
Party	Candidate	Votes	%	±%
Democratic	John F. McKeon	30,554	27.8	▼0.2
Democratic	Mila M. Jasey	29,345	26.7	▼0.4
Republican	Angelo Tedesco	25,378	23.1	▲0.6
Republican	Laura M. Ali	24,732	22.5	▲0.1
Total votes		110,009	100.0	

New Jersey general election, 2011
Party	Candidate	Votes	%
Democratic	John F. McKeon	23,508	28.0
Democratic	Mila M. Jasey	22,757	27.1
Republican	Lee Holtzman	18,857	22.5
Republican	Nicole Hagner	18,790	22.4
Total votes		83,912	100.0

New Jersey general election, 2009
Party	Candidate	Votes	%	±%
Democratic	John F. McKeon	33,013	32.8	▼7.2
Democratic	Mila M. Jasey	30,399	30.2	▼6.4
Republican	Mark Meyerowitz	18,841	18.7	▲0.7
Republican	Barry Funt	18,409	18.3	N/A
Total votes		100,662	100.0	

New Jersey general election, 2007
Party	Candidate	Votes	%	±%
Democratic	John F. McKeon	19,246	40.0	▲5.4
Democratic	Mila M. Jasey	17,620	36.6	▲4.2
Republican	Mark Meyerowitz	8,644	18.0	▲1.3
Ethical Efficient Government	Edward B. Marable Jr	2,627	5.4	N/A
Total votes		48,137	100.0	

New Jersey general election, 2005
Party	Candidate	Votes	%	±%
Democratic	John F. McKeon	35,651	34.6	▲2.1
Democratic	Mims Hackett Jr.	33,323	32.4	▲1.6
Republican	Michael J. Rizzo	17,227	16.7	▼1.3
Republican	Charles A. Rosen	16,785	16.3	▼1.1
Total votes		102,986	100.0	

New Jersey general election, 2003
Party	Candidate	Votes	%	±%
Democratic	John F. McKeon	16,621	32.5	▲1.1
Democratic	Mims Hackett Jr	15,751	30.8	▲1.9
Republican	Tod Theise	9,207	18.0	▼1.1
Republican	Patience Elliot	8,864	17.4	▼1.2
Libertarian	Jany Sabins	631	1.2	N/A
Total votes		51,074	100.0	

New Jersey general election, 2001
Party	Candidate	Votes	%
Democratic	John F. McKeon	33,866	31.4
Democratic	Mims Hackett Jr	31,179	28.9
Republican	Muriel M. Shore	20,536	19.1
Republican	Joseph Tempesta	20,074	18.6
African-Americans For Justice	Natalie Heard	1,183	1.1
African-Americans For Justice	Tobi Moor	930	0.9
Total votes		107,768	100.0

New Jersey general election, 1999
Party	Candidate	Votes	%	±%
Democratic	LeRoy J. Jones, Jr.	13,001	39.4	▼9.6
Democratic	Nia H. Gill	12,962	39.3	▼9.4
Republican	Patricia Loreto	3,521	10.7	N/A
Republican	Charles Davies	3,506	10.6	N/A
Total votes		32,990	100.0	

New Jersey general election, 1997
Party	Candidate	Votes	%	±%
Democratic	LeRoy J. Jones, Jr.	34,377	49.0	▲14.5
Democratic	Nia H. Gill	34,176	48.7	▲13.1
Socialist	John Winter	1,051	1.5	▲0.4
Natural Law	Jeffrey M. Levine	601	0.9	N/A
Total votes		70,205	100.0	

New Jersey general election, 1995
Party	Candidate	Votes	%	±%
Democratic	Nia H. Gill	15,903	35.6	▲1.1
Democratic	Le Roy J. Jones, Jr.	15,409	34.5	▼0.7
Republican	Jake Shapiro	6,212	13.9	▼0.7
Republican	Barbara A. Dennis	6,167	13.8	▼0.7
Conservative	Richard Schumm	495	1.1	N/A
Socialist	John-Martin Winter	478	1.1	N/A
Total votes		44,664	100.0	

New Jersey general election, 1993
Party	Candidate	Votes	%	±%
Democratic	LeRoy J. Jones, Jr.	28,680	35.2	▼2.8
Democratic	Nia H. Gill	28,143	34.5	▼2.1
Republican	Tod A. Thiese	11,938	14.6	▼6.1
Republican	Everett Jennings	11,809	14.5	N/A
Independent People's Choice	Anthony F. Montanelli	982	1.2	N/A
Total votes		81,552	100.0	

1991 New Jersey general election
Party	Candidate	Votes	%
Democratic	Stephanie R. Bush	18,308	38.0
Democratic	Robert L. Brown	17,614	36.6
Republican	Dorcas O’Neal-Williams	9,976	20.7
Direct Representative	Daniel L. Tindall, Jr.	2,247	4.7
Total votes		48,145	100.0

1989 New Jersey general election
Party	Candidate	Votes	%	±%
Democratic	Stephanie R. Bush	26,536	37.1	▲0.9
Democratic	Harry A. McEnroe	26,512	37.0	▼0.5
Republican	Anthony Benevento	10,531	14.7	▲1.0
Republican	Michael Webb	8,035	11.2	▼1.4
Total votes		71,614	100.0	

1987 New Jersey general election
Party	Candidate	Votes	%	±%
Democratic	Harry A. McEnroe	15,545	37.5	▲6.0
Democratic	Stephanie R. Bush	15,020	36.2	▲4.9
Republican	Lilliana Piccione	5,697	13.7	▼5.0
Republican	James C. Pitchford	5,211	12.6	▼5.8
Total votes		41,473	100.0	

1985 New Jersey general election
Party	Candidate	Votes	%	±%
Democratic	Harry A. McEnroe	20,780	31.5	▼5.4
Democratic	Mildred Barry Garvin	20,680	31.3	▼5.1
Republican	Jean Brozyna	12,345	18.7	▲4.9
Republican	Chandler Dennis	12,167	18.4	▲5.4
Total votes		65,972	100.0	

New Jersey general election, 1983
Party	Candidate	Votes	%	±%
Democratic	Harry A. McEnroe	17,490	36.9	▲3.0
Democratic	Mildred Barry Garvin	17,282	36.4	▲2.2
Republican	Richard Koehler	6,527	13.8	▼2.7
Republican	Larry C. D. Minter	6,149	13.0	▼2.5
Total votes		47,448	100.0	

New Jersey general election, 1981
Party	Candidate	Votes	%
Democratic	Mildred Barry Garvin	27,310	34.2
Democratic	Harry A. McEnroe	27,102	33.9
Republican	William R. Calabrese	13,170	16.5
Republican	Chris Tantleff DeGregorio	12,385	15.5
Total votes		79,967	100.0

New Jersey general election, 1979
Party	Candidate	Votes	%	±%
Democratic	A.J. “Buddy” Fortunato	20,516	26.2	▲0.9
Republican	Carl A. Orechio	19,270	24.6	▼2.5
Republican	Anthony Gallo	18,415	23.5	▼0.1
Democratic	Robert W. Noonan	18,206	23.2	▼0.3
Tenants Taxpayers	Betty Hutchinson	2,046	2.6	N/A
Total votes		78,453	100.0	

New Jersey general election, 1977
Party	Candidate	Votes	%	±%
Republican	Carl A. Orechio	26,943	27.1	▼0.9
Democratic	A. Joseph Fortunato	25,212	25.3	▲0.8
Republican	Roger L. Toner	23,479	23.6	▼4.1
Democratic	Diane L. Horowitz	23,411	23.5	▲3.7
Libertarian	Barry L. Siegel	268	0.3	N/A
Libertarian	Alfred J. Korby	266	0.3	N/A
Total votes		99,579	100.0	

New Jersey general election, 1975
Party	Candidate	Votes	%	±%
Republican	Carl A. Orechio	26,773	28.0	▲3.2
Republican	John N. Dennis	26,471	27.7	▲4.4
Democratic	Robert M. Ruane	23,404	24.5	▼1.3
Democratic	Herbert Lev	18,886	19.8	▼4.5
Total votes		95,534	100.0	

New Jersey general election, 1973
Party	Candidate	Votes	%
Democratic	Robert M. Ruane	28,465	25.8
Republican	Carl A. Orechio	27,395	24.8
Democratic	James J. Mills	26,877	24.3
Republican	John N. Dennis	25,764	23.3
Independent	Lois Gingerelli	2,040	1.8
Total votes		110,541	100.0
