= Lucille Davy =

New Jersey Commissioner of Education from 2005 to 2010

Commissioner of the New Jersey Department of Education
- In office September 9, 2005 – March 11, 2010
- Preceded by: William Librera
- Succeeded by: Bret Schundler

Lucille Davy was the Commissioner of Education in New Jersey. She was named acting commissioner on September 9, 2005, by former Governor of New Jersey Richard Codey. She was named commissioner by Governor Jon Corzine as of July 11, 2006.

When she was named acting commissioner by Codey, she joined her husband, then Human Services Commissioner James Davy, in the cabinet. They are the first husband and wife to serve together in a state cabinet.

She is a former education policy advisor to Codey and former Gov. James McGreevey. When Corzine took office he announced his intention to retain Davy as acting commissioner while he led a national search for a new commissioner, a search which included Davy. When he appointed Davy to the post, he said her work as acting commissioner convinced him to select her for the permanent post.

Davy is a lifelong New Jersey resident and grew up in Livingston, New Jersey where she was a graduate of Livingston High School. She graduated cum laude from Seton Hall University with a bachelor's degree in mathematics, and she received her law degree from the Notre Dame Law School. She and her husband reside in Pennington, New Jersey.
