= John F. McKeon =

Member of the New Jersey General Assembly

John McKeon

Member of the New Jersey Senate from the 27th district
- Incumbent
- Assumed office January 9, 2024
- Preceded by: Richard Codey

Member of the New Jersey General Assembly from the 27th district
- In office January 8, 2002 – January 9, 2024 Serving with: Mims Hackett (2002–2007); Mila Jasey (2007–2024)
- Preceded by: Nia Gill; LeRoy J. Jones Jr.
- Succeeded by: Rosy Bagolie; Alixon Collazos-Gill

Mayor of West Orange
- In office July 1, 1998 – June 30, 2010
- Preceded by: Samuel Spina
- Succeeded by: Robert Parisi

Personal details
- Born: June 3, 1958 (age 68) Montclair, New Jersey, U.S.
- Party: Democratic
- Spouse: Ann Mader
- Children: 3
- Education: West Orange Mountain High School
- Alma mater: Muhlenberg College (BA); Seton Hall University (JD)
- Website: Legislative website

John F. McKeon (born June 3, 1958) is an American Democratic Party politician who represents the 27th Legislative District in the New Jersey Senate, which primarily covers the western portion of Essex County. McKeon previously served in the New Jersey General Assembly from 2002 to 2024, where he was Assistant Majority Whip (2004–05), Assistant Majority Leader (2006–07), Majority Whip (2008–09), Deputy Speaker (2010–11) and was the Parliamentarian from 2022 to 2024. He is also a former mayor of West Orange.

== Early life and education ==
McKeon was born June 3, 1958, in Montclair, New Jersey, the oldest of four children, born to John F. McKeon Jr. (1925–2002) and Anita (née Monzo). He is of Irish and Italian descent. McKeon was raised in Orange and West Orange, New Jersey. He is a graduate of West Orange Mountain High School.

McKeon received a B.A. in 1980 from Muhlenberg College, cum laude, in history and was awarded a J.D. in 1983 from the Seton Hall University School of Law. At graduation, he was the recipient of the Peter Rodino Law Society Outstanding Student Award.

== Career ==
He then served as judicial clerk to Joseph M. Thuring, Superior Court of New Jersey in Hudson County, and as a legislative aide to Representative Joseph Minish. McKeon is a former legislative counsel to Senator Richard Codey and counsel to the West Orange Board of Adjustment.

He is a senior partner at Hardin, Kundla, McKeon, Poletto and Polifroni, a law firm in Springfield Township. He is married to Ann Mader McKeon, also an attorney at the same firm, and has three daughters.

== Political career ==
McKeon had served on the Township of West Orange Council from 1992 to 1998 as the Mayor of West Orange from 1998 to 2010. From the time that he took office in the Assembly in 2002 until he left his position as mayor in June 2010, he simultaneously held a seat in the New Jersey General Assembly and was West Orange Mayor. This dual position, often called double dipping, was allowed under a grandfather clause in the state law enacted by the New Jersey Legislature and signed into law by Governor of New Jersey Jon Corzine in September 2007 that prevents dual-office-holding but allows those who had held both positions as of February 1, 2008, to retain both posts. On July 1, 2010, Robert Parisi took over the mayoral position.

On August 14, 2023 State Senator and former New Jersey Governor Richard Codey announced he would be retiring from the New Jersey State Senate at the end of his current term. McKeon was subsequently chosen as the new Democratic State Senate nominee for the newly redrawn state legislative district 27; he ultimately won the general election.

== New Jersey General Assembly ==
During his first term in the Legislature, McKeon was the prime sponsor of the Assembly version of the laws requiring school districts to adopt anti-harassment policies, strengthening school bus driver background checks and revising the State's laws concerning the release of wild animals, and was a prime sponsor of the Patients First Medical Malpractice Insurance reform legislation.

Other leadership positions McKeon has held during his tenure in the Assembly include Assistant Majority Whip from 2004 to 2005, Assistant Majority Leader from 2006 to 2007, Majority Whip in 2008 and 2009, and Deputy Speaker from 2010 to 2011. John McKeon was one of the 11 sponsors of the "New Jersey Insurance Marketplace Preservation Act" also known as bill A3380 which enacts the shared responsibility penalty in state income tax.

== New Jersey Senate ==
Following the 2021 reapportionment, all of the municipalities in Morris County were removed from the district, while the Passaic County municipality of Clifton was shifted from its longtime home in the 34th district. In the June 2023 Democratic primary, the first held under the 2021 reapportionment, incumbent Senator Richard Codey defeated incumbent 34th district Senator Nia Gill, though Codey announced in August that he would retire at the end of the term. McKeon was selected to replace Codey on the November ballot. McKeon defeated Republican Michael D. Byrne in the 2023 New Jersey Senate election.

=== Committees ===
Committee assignments for the 2024—2025 Legislative Session are:

- State Government, Wagering, Tourism & Historic Preservation (as vice-chair)
- Environment and Energy

=== District 27 ===
Each of the 40 districts in the New Jersey Legislature has one representative in the New Jersey Senate and two members in the New Jersey General Assembly. The representatives from the 27th District for the 2024—2025 Legislative Session are:

- Senator John F. McKeon (D)
- Assemblyman Rosy Bagolie (D)
- Assemblywoman Alixon Collazos-Gill (D)

== Electoral history ==
=== Senate ===
27th Legislative District General Election, 2023
Party	Candidate	Votes	%
Democratic	John F. McKeon	28,499	71.1
Republican	Michael D. Byrne	11,566	28.9
Total votes		40,065	100.0
Democratic hold			

=== General Assembly ===
27th legislative district general election, 2021
Party	Candidate	Votes	%
Democratic	John F. McKeon (incumbent)	48,489	31.62%
Democratic	Mila M. Jasey (incumbent)	47,461	30.95%
Republican	Kevin Ryan	28,983	18.90%
Republican	Jonathan Sym	28,419	18.53%
Total votes		153,352	100.0
Democratic hold			

27th Legislative District General Election, 2019
Party	Candidate	Votes	%
Democratic	John McKeon (incumbent)	26,062	32.6%
Democratic	Mila Jasey (incumbent)	25,282	31.63%
Republican	Michael Dailey	14,353	17.96%
Republican	Mauro Tucci	14,236	17.81%
Total votes		79,933	100%
Democratic hold			

== Personal life ==
McKeon is married and has three children. He is a resident of West Orange, New Jersey.

New Jersey General Assembly
Preceded by Nia Gill; LeRoy J. Jones Jr.	Member of the New Jersey General Assembly from the 27th district 2002–present Served alongside: Mims Hackett, Mila Jasey	Incumbent
