= Mims Hackett =

American politician (born 1941)

Member of the New Jersey General Assembly from the 27th Legislative District
- In office January 8, 2002 – September 10, 2007 Serving with John F. McKeon
- Preceded by: Nia Gill; LeRoy J. Jones Jr.
- Succeeded by: Mila Jasey

Mayor of Orange, New Jersey
- In office 1996 – May 27, 2008
- Preceded by: Robert L. Brown
- Succeeded by: Eldridge Hawkins Jr.

Personal details
- Born: September 28, 1941 (age 84) Birmingham, Alabama
- Party: Democratic

Mims Hackett Jr. (born September 28, 1941) is an American Democratic Party politician, who served in the New Jersey General Assembly from 2002 to 2007, where he represented the 27th Legislative District, which covers the western portion of Essex County.

== Biography ==
He was born on September 28, 1941, in Birmingham, Alabama. Hackett received a B.S. in 1963 from Paul Quinn College in biology and physical science and received an M.S. in 1976 from Seton Hall University in administration and supervision.

Hackett served in the Assembly on the State Government Committee (as Chair), the Appropriations Committee and the Military and Veterans' Affairs Committee.

Hackett served as the Mayor of Orange, New Jersey from 1996 to 2008. He served on its City Council from 1988 to 1996. He spent thirty-two years as a science teacher in the Union City School District.

== 2007 corruption charges ==
Hackett was arrested by the FBI on September 6, 2007, in a Federal corruption probe that also included the arrests of Assemblymen Alfred E. Steele and Passaic Mayor Samuel Rivera. The indictment alleges that Hackett accepted $5,000 in bribes for his efforts to steer insurance business from the City of Orange, with an additional $25,000 to be accepted if the firm received the insurance business it sought. On September 7, 2007, Governor of New Jersey Jon Corzine called on both Hackett and Steele to resign from their seats in the New Jersey Legislature.

Hackett submitted his letter of resignation from his Assembly seat on September 10, 2007; Steele followed with his resignation submitted that same day. In resigning before September 17, 2007, the Democratic Party was able to put an alternate on the November ballot in lieu of Hackett. He resigned as mayor of Orange on May 27, 2008.

Hackett was convicted on a charge of falsifying expense receipts and was sentenced to a five-year prison term beginning in January 2009. In December of that year, he was accepted into a state early-release program and was allowed to return home.

He currently resides in Orange.
