= Portugal Day Festival in Newark =

Street festival

Coordinates: 40.72955°N 74.15943°W

Portugal Day Festival
- Genre: Cultural
- Dates: June 8th, 9th and 10th, Portugal Day
- Location: (United States) Ferry Street in Newark, New Jersey
- Years active: 47 years
- Founded: 1979
- Patron: Luís de Camões

The Portugal Day Festival in Newark, New Jersey is a street festival celebrating the Portuguese people, language, and their culture. First organized in 1979 by the Bernardino Coutinho Foundation, since 2010 the Festival has been organized by the Union of Portuguese American Clubs of New Jersey (União de Clubes Luso-Americanos de New Jersey), or UCLANJ. Although various events occur the week prior, the actual street festival typically takes place on the weekend closest to June 10, the official Portugal Day. As of 2015 the festival has been run by its official Portugal Day Newark a 501c (3) non-profit organization. The festival is known to attract over 750,000 event goers to Ferry Street in the Ironbound.

The festival went on hiatus from 2020 to 2021, and was scaled back in 2022.

Facts about Portugal: The cultural festival takes months of planning. Plans include inviting guests to be grand marshal, honorary grand marshal, or any of the prized people in attendance over the Portugal Day weekend. There are also many events prior to the big weekend, such as the Friendship Night Gala, that bring out the Portuguese community.

== Television broadcast ==
The festivities are often telecast, live or recorded, to stations not only in New Jersey, but also in Portugal and Portuguese-speaking countries in Africa and South America.

== Portugal Day Races ==
The Portugal Day Races take place every year on the Sunday morning of Portugal Day weekend prior to the parade. Every year runners and walkers, Portuguese or not, gather and race in the historic Ironbound section, celebrating Portuguese-American culture.

The race was founded in 1979 by the late Manuel Parente and was directed for many years by the late Domingos Cravo. The races have always been organized by Lar Dos Leos (Den of Lions). In honor of Parente's and Cravo's contributions to the Portuguese community, the "Cravo Kid Dash" and the "Parente Mile" have been named in their honor. The 5k race has also been renamed as the "Jack Casimiro 5k" in honor of a longtime sponsor of the Portugal Day Races, the late Jack Casimiro. Today, the race is still organized by Lar Dos Leos (Den of Lions) and by longtime race director Carlos Martins.

== Parade ==
On the Sunday of that weekend, there is a parade with many floats representing various organizations from throughout the state, both Portuguese and non-Portuguese. Every year there is an Honorary Grand Marshal, a Grand Marshal, as well as many other prized personalities.

Awards change from year to year, for example in 2025, there was a student of the year Bruna Demetrio and a business of the year, Manny Lopes of Lopes Hardware.

Year	Honorary Grand Marshal	Grand Marshal	Prestigious Award	Man of the Year	Luso American of the Year	Woman of the Year	Artist of the Year	Athlete of the Year	Medal of Honor	Fado Singer of the Year
2025	Mayor Anthony Vazand posthumous Jitu Jiteshkumar	Phil Neto		Jose Carlos Adao		Katherine Soares				
2023	Mayor Ras Baraka	Antonio “Tony” Pereira		Fernando Silva	Eliana Pintor Marin	Helena Vinhas	-	-	-	-
2017	-	-	-	-	–	-	-	-	-	-
2016	-	Sr. Nobre	-	-	–	-	-	-	-	-
2015	-	-	-	-	–	-	-	-	-	-
2014	-	-	-	-	–	-	-	-	-	-
2013	-	-	-	-	–	-	-	-	-	-
2012	-	-	-	-	–	-	-	-	-	-
2011	-	-	-	-	–	-	-	-	-	-
2010	-	-	-	-	–	-	-	-	-	-
2009	Jon S. Corzine	José Luís Pereira Carneiro	Louis LaSalle	José Paulino Conde Teixeira	–	Olga Gonçalves Rodrigues	Mena Leandro	José Rebimbas	Manuel Grova; João Machado; Luciana Abreu	Emília Silva
2008	António Matinho	Fátima Campos Ferreira	–	Mário Santos	–	Ana Gonçalves	Maria Conceição Simões Silva	Carlos Rasoilo	Jorge Lacão	–
2007	Cory A. Booker	João de Vallera	–	José Casimiro	–	Maria Manuela Cardielos	Manuel Joaquim da Silva	Tony Nogueira	Luís Filipe Menezes; Joseph Vas; Jack Martins	–
2006	Dr. Zachary Yamba	Pedro J. Belo	–	Tony Gomes	–	Linda Maria Rodrigues	Cora D' Abreu	José Manuel Gonçalves	Luís Pires; Francisco Carlos Azevedo	–
2005	Joseph N. DiVincenzo, Jr.	Francisco Knopfli	–	Joaquim (Jack)Casmiro	–	Manuela da Luz Chaplin	Fernando Araújo	Carlos Martins	José Rendeiro; João Alberto Gouveia	–
2004	Dina Matos	Dr. Pedro Catarino	–	José Rebimbas	–	Domitília M. dos Santos	Jorge Quaresma	João M. Soares	Jack Maia	–
2003	Eduardo Cruz	Dr. José de Almeida Cesário	–	Manuel Nata	–	Céu Cirne-Neves	Zeca Santos	Jorge Oliveira	Tony Nobre	–
2002	Jim McGreevey	Dr. Manuela Aguiar	–	José Martins	–	Beatriz Santos	Fátima Molina	Francisco L. Barra Abreu	Dina Matos; Inês Simões	–
2001	Augusto Amador	Dr. Ferro Rodrigues	–	Vitor Alves	–	Isabel Costa	–	José Manso	Alberto G. Santos; Father Peter Uhde	–
2000	James Treffinger	Dr. Fernando Nobre	–	Jorge Ventura	–	Maria João Ávila	–	Manuel Parente	Assistência Médica Internacional	–
1999	Bob Menendez	Dr. José Gama	–	António Novo	–	Odete Cardoso	–	Francisco Marcos	Dr. Aníbal Cavaco Silva; Dr. Durão Barroso	–
1998	António Seabra	Amália Rodrigues	–	José Luís Pereira Almeida	–	Glória de Melo	–	Carlos Pais	Father José Manuel R. Fernandes; Dr. Maria José Rita	–
1997	Henry Martinez	José Ramos Horta	–	Alfredo Rendeiro	–	Emestina Cascaes	–	Edmundo Moraes	Dr. Ramos Horta; Dr. José Gama	–
1996	Kenneth A. Gibson	Avelino Ferreira Torres	–	Domingos Cravo	–	Maria Amélia Costa	–	Carlos Rocha	José Martins	–
1995	Christine Todd Whitman	Luís Sousa Macedo	–	Agostinho Barbosa	–	Maria Fernanda A. Morais	–	–	Avelino Ferreira Torres	–
1994	–	João Antão	–	–	–	–	–	–	–	–
1993	–	Jim Flório	–	–	–	–	–	–	–	–
1992	–	Armando Fontoura	–	–	–	–	–	–	–	–
1991	–	Rui V. Lourenço	–	–	–	–	–	–	–	–
1990	–	Jorge Cardielos	–	–	–	–	–	–	–	–
1989	–	Sharpe James	–	–	–	–	–	–	–	–
