= New Jersey legislative districts, 2021 apportionment =

New Jersey Legislature
- 220th through 224th Legislatures

Type
- Type: Bicameral
- Houses: Senate; General Assembly

History
- Founded: January 9, 2024
- Disbanded: January 12, 2032
- Preceded by: 2011 apportionment
- Succeeded by: 2031 apportionment

Structure
- Seats: 120
- Political groups: Democratic Party; Republican Party

Meeting place
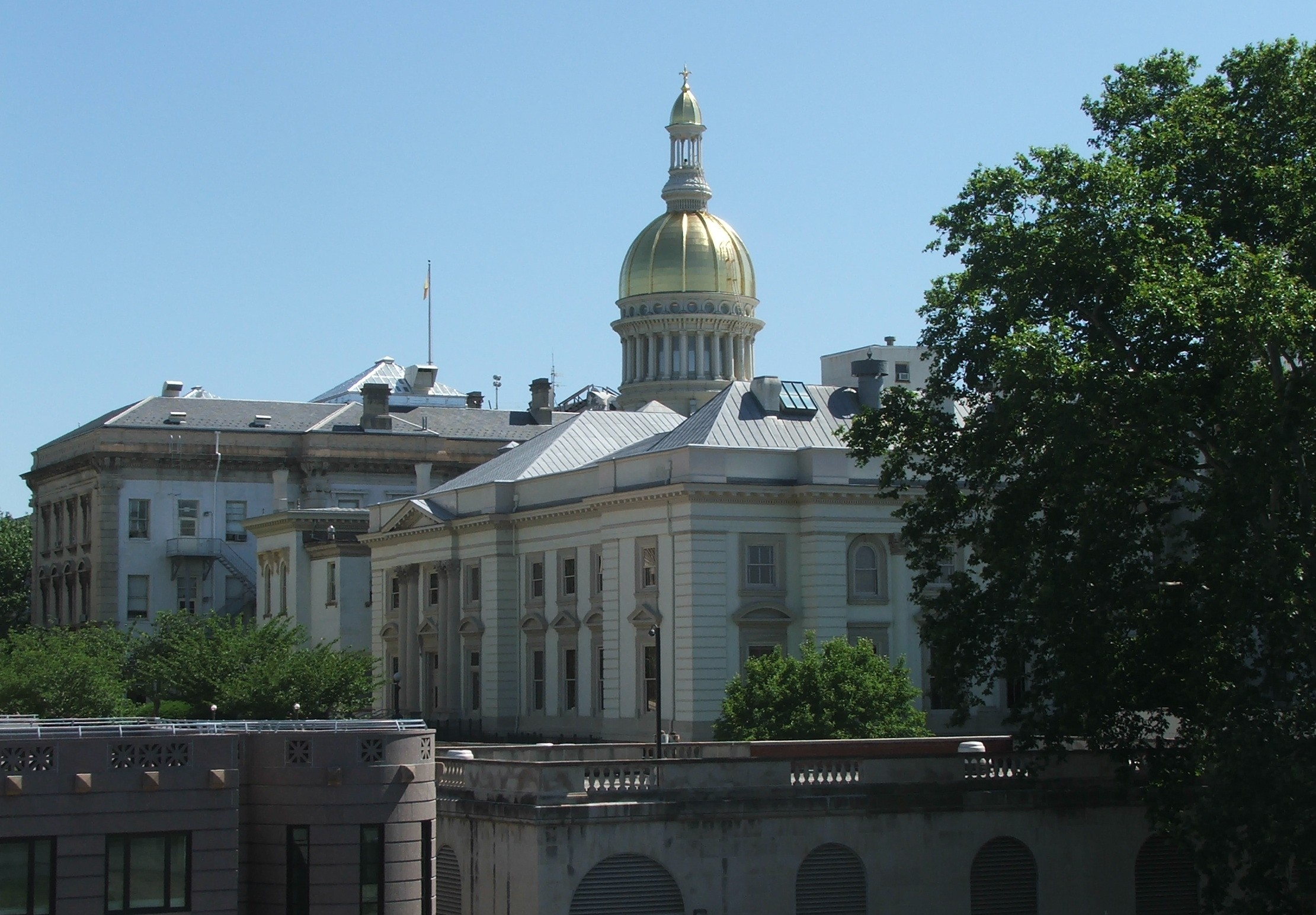
- New Jersey State House, Trenton, New Jersey

Website
- njleg.state.nj.us

As per 2021 redistricting

The members of the New Jersey Legislature are chosen from 40 electoral districts. Each district elects one senator and two assemblymen.

New Jersey is one of only seven states with nested state legislative districts, in which the lower house's districts are coextensive with a single state Senate seat. In New Jersey, each district elects one Senator and two Assembly members. (States which have similar practices are Arizona, Idaho, Maryland, North Dakota, South Dakota and Washington).

Districts are reapportioned decennially by the New Jersey Apportionment Commission following each United States census, as provided by Article IV, Section III of the state Constitution.

The legislative districts listed below went into effect with the swearing-in of the 221st Legislature in 2024 and will be used for regular elections from 2023 through 2031 following the 2020 United States census. The districts were supposed to go into effect with the 2021 elections, however, this was delayed due to the census information being postponed due to the COVID-19 pandemic. The districts are as follows:

== District 1 ==
For the 2026–2027 session, the 1st legislative district of the New Jersey Legislature is represented in the State Senate by Mike Testa (R, Vineland) and in the General Assembly by Antwan McClellan (R, Ocean City) and Erik K. Simonsen (R, Lower Township).

Avalon, Cape May, Cape May Point, Commercial Township, Corbin City, Dennis Township, Downe, Estell Manor, Fairfield, Lawerence, Lower Township, Maurice River Township, Middle Township, Millville, North Wildwood, Ocean City, Sea Isle City, Somers Point, Stone Harbor, Upper Township, Vineland, Weymouth, West Cape May, West Wildwood, Wildwood, Wildwood Crest, Woodbine

== District 2 ==
For the 2026–2027 session, the 2nd legislative district of the New Jersey Legislature is represented in the New Jersey Senate by Vincent J. Polistina (R, Egg Harbor Township) and in the General Assembly by Don Guardian (R, Atlantic City) and Maureen Rowan (D, Atlantic City).

Absecon, Atlantic City, Brigantine, Egg Harbor Township, Galloway, Hamilton Township, Linwood, Longport, Margate City, Northfield, Pleasantville, Port Republic, Somers Point, Ventnor City

== District 3 ==
For the 2026–2027 session, the 3rd legislative district of the New Jersey Legislature is represented in the State Senate by John Burzichelli (D, Paulsboro) and in the General Assembly by David Bailey (D, Woodstown) and Heather Simmons (D, Glassboro).

Alloway Township, Carneys Point Township, Clayton, Deerfield East Greenwich Township, Elk Township, Elmer, Elsinboro Township, Glassboro, Greenwich Township (Cumberland), Greenwich Township (Gloucester), Harrison Township, Hopewell Township, Logan Township, Lower Alloways Creek Township, Mannington Township, Mantua Township, National Park, Newfield, Oldmans Township, Paulsboro, Penns Grove, Pennsville Township, Pilesgrove Township, Pitman, Pittsgrove Township, Quinton Township, Salem, Shiloh, South Harrison Township, Stow Creek Township, Swedesboro, Upper Deerfield Township, Upper Pittsgrove Township, Wenonah, West Deptford Township, Westville, Woodstown, Woolwich Township

== District 4 ==
For the 2026–2027 session, the 4th legislative district of the New Jersey Legislature is represented in the State Senate by Paul D. Moriarty (D, Washington Township) and in the General Assembly by Dan Hutchison (D, Gloucester Township) and Cody Miller (D, Monroe Township).

Buena, Buena Vista, Chesilhurst, Franklin Township, Gloucester Township, Monroe Township, Newfield, Washington Township, Waterford, Winslow

== District 5 ==
For the 2026–2027 session, the 5th legislative district of the New Jersey Legislature is represented in the State Senate by Nilsa Cruz-Perez (D, Barrington) and in the General Assembly by Bill Moen (D, Camden) and William Spearman (D, Camden).

Audubon, Barrington, Bellmawr, Brooklawn, Camden, Collingswood, Deptford Township, Gloucester City, Haddon Heights, Merchantville, Mount Ephraim, Pennsauken, Runnemede, Woodbury, Woodbury Heights, Woodlynne

== District 6 ==
For the 2026–2027 session, the 6th legislative district of the New Jersey Legislature is represented in the State Senate by James Beach (D, Voorhees Township) and in the General Assembly by Louis Greenwald (D, Voorhees Township) and Melinda Kane (D, Cherry Hill).

Audubon Park, Berlin Borough, Berlin Township, Cherry Hill Township, Clementon, Gibbsboro, Haddon Township, Haddonfield, Hi-Nella, Laurel Springs, Lawnside, Lindenwold, Magnolia, Maple Shade, Oaklyn, Pine Hill, Somerdale, Stratford, Tavistock, Voorhees Township

== District 7 ==
For the 2026–2027 session, the 7th legislative district of the New Jersey Legislature is represented in the State Senate by Troy Singleton (D, Palmyra) and in the General Assembly by Carol A. Murphy (D, Mount Laurel) and Balvir Singh (D, Burlington Township).

Beverly City, Bordentown, Bordentown Township, Burlington City, Burlington Township, Cinnaminson Township, Delanco Township, Delran Township, Edgewater Park Township, Fieldsboro, Florence Township, Moorestown, Mount Laurel, Palmyra, Riverside Township, Riverton, Willingboro Township

== District 8 ==
For the 2026–2027 session, the 8th legislative district of the New Jersey Legislature is represented in the New Jersey Senate by Latham Tiver (R, Southampton Township) and in the General Assembly by Anthony Angelozzi (D, Hammonton) and Andrea Katz (D, Chesterfield Township).

Bass River Township, Chesterfield Township, Eastampton Township, Egg Harbor City, New Jersey, Evesham Township, Folsom, Hainesport Township, Hammonton, Lumberton Township, Mansfield Township, Medford Lakes, Medford Township, Mount Holly, Mullica, New Hanover, Pemberton, Pemberton Township, Shamong Township, Southampton Township, Springfield Township, Tabernacle Township, Washington Township, Westampton, Woodland Township, Wrightstown

== District 9 ==
For the 2026–2027 session, the 9th legislative district of the New Jersey Legislature is represented in the State Senate by Carmen Amato (R, Berkeley Township) and in the General Assembly by Greg Myhre (R, Stafford Township) and Brian E. Rumpf (R, Little Egg Harbor Township).

Barnegat Light, Barnegat Township, Beach Haven, Beachwood, Berkeley Township, Eagleswood Township, Harvey Cedars, Lacey Township, Lakehurst, Little Egg Harbor Township, Long Beach Township, Manchester Township, Ocean Gate, Ocean Township, Pine Beach, Ship Bottom, Stafford Township, Surf City, Tuckerton

== District 10 ==
For the 2026–2027 session, the 10th legislative district of the New Jersey Legislature is represented in the State Senate by James W. Holzapfel (R, Toms River) and in the General Assembly by Paul Kanitra (R, Point Pleasant Beach) and Gregory P. McGuckin (R, Toms River).

Bay Head, Brielle, Brick Township, Island Heights, Lavallette, Manasquan, Mantoloking, Point Pleasant Beach, Point Pleasant, Sea Girt, Seaside Heights, Seaside Park, Spring Lake, Spring Lake Heights, South Toms River, Toms River

== District 11 ==
For the 2026–2027 session, the 11th legislative district of the New Jersey Legislature is represented in the New Jersey Senate by Vin Gopal (D, Long Branch) and in the General Assembly by Margie Donlon (D, Ocean Township) and Luanne Peterpaul (D, Long Branch).

Allenhurst, Asbury Park, Bradley Beach, Colts Neck, Deal, Eatontown, Fairhaven, Freehold Borough, Freehold Township, Interlaken, Loch Arbour, Long Branch, Neptune City, Neptune Township, Ocean Township, Red Bank, Shrewsbury, Shrewsbury Township, Tinton Falls

== District 12 ==
For the 2026–2027 session, the 12th legislative district of the New Jersey Legislature is represented in the State Senate by Owen Henry (R, Old Bridge Township) and in the General Assembly by Robert D. Clifton (R, Matawan) and Alex Sauickie (R, Jackson Township).

Allentown, Englishtown, Helmetta, Jackson Township, Manalapan Township, Matawan, Millstone Township, North Hanover, Old Bridge, Plumsted Township, Roosevelt, Spotswood, Upper Freehold

== District 13 ==
For the 2026–2027 session, the 13th legislative district of the New Jersey Legislature is represented in the New Jersey Senate by Declan O'Scanlon (R, Little Silver) and in the General Assembly by Vicky Flynn (R, Holmdel Township) and Gerard Scharfenberger (R, Middletown Township).

Aberdeen Township, Atlantic Highlands, Hazlet Township, Highlands, Holmdel Township, Keansburg, Keyport, Little Silver, Marlboro Township, Middletown Township, Monmouth Beach, Oceanport, Rumson, Sea Bright, Union Beach, West Long Branch

== District 14 ==
For the 2026–2027 session, the 14th legislative district of the New Jersey Legislature is represented in the State Senate by Linda R. Greenstein (D, Plainsboro Township) and in the General Assembly by Wayne DeAngelo (D, Hamilton Township) and Tennille McCoy (D, Hamilton Township).

Cranbury Township, East Windsor, Hamilton Township, Hightstown, Jamesburg, Monroe Township, Plainsboro Township, Robbinsville Township

== District 15 ==
For the 2026–2027 session, the 15th legislative district of the New Jersey Legislature is represented in the State Senate by Shirley Turner (D, Lawrence Township) and in the General Assembly by Verlina Reynolds-Jackson (D, Trenton) and Anthony Verrelli (D, Hopewell Township).

Delaware Township, East Amwell, Ewing Township, Frenchtown, Hopewell, Hopewell Township, Kingwood, Lambertville, Lawrence Township, Pennington, Stockton, Trenton, West Amwell, West Windsor

== District 16 ==
For the 2026–2027 session, the 16th legislative district of the New Jersey Legislature is represented in the New Jersey Senate by Andrew Zwicker (D, South Brunswick) and in the General Assembly by Mitchelle Drulis (D, East Amwell Township) and Roy Freiman (D, Hillsborough Township).

Branchburg Township, Clinton, Clinton Township, Flemington, High Bridge, Hillsborough Township, Lebanon, Millstone, Montgomery Township, Princeton, Raritan, Readington, Rocky Hill, Somerville, South Brunswick

== District 17 ==
For the 2026–2027 session, the 17th legislative district of the New Jersey Legislature is represented in the State Senate by Bob Smith (D, Piscataway) and in the General Assembly by Joseph Danielsen (D, Franklin Township) and Kevin Egan (D, New Brunswick).

Franklin Township, New Brunswick City, North Brunswick Township, Piscataway Township South Bound Brook

== District 18 ==
For the 2026–2027 session, the 18th legislative district of the New Jersey Legislature is represented in the State Senate by Patrick J. Diegnan (D, South Plainfield) and in the General Assembly by Robert Karabinchak (D, Edison) and Sterley Stanley (D, East Brunswick).

East Brunswick Township, Edison Township, Highland Park, Metuchen, Milltown, South Plainfield, South River

== District 19 ==
For the 2026–2027 session, the 19th legislative district of the New Jersey Legislature is represented in the State Senate by Joe F. Vitale (D, Woodbridge Township) and in the General Assembly by Craig Coughlin (D, Woodbridge Township) and Yvonne Lopez (D, Perth Amboy).

Carteret, Perth Amboy, Sayreville, South Amboy, Woodbridge Township

== District 20 ==
For the 2026–2027 session, the 20th legislative district of the New Jersey Legislature is represented in the State Senate by Joseph Cryan (D, Union Township) and in the General Assembly by Annette Quijano (D, Elizabeth) and Ed Rodriguez (D, Elizabeth).

Elizabeth, Kenilworth, Roselle, Union Township

== District 21 ==
For the 2026–2027 session, the 21st legislative district of the New Jersey Legislature is represented in the State Senate by Jon Bramnick (R, Westfield) and in the General Assembly by Vincent Kearney (D, Garwood) and Andrew Macurdy (D, Summit).

Berkeley Heights Township, Bernards, Bernardsville, Chatham, Chatham Township, Dunellen, Far Hills, Garwood, Gladstone, Green Brook, Long Hill Township, Middlesex, Mountainside, New Providence, Peapack, Springfield Township, Summit, Warren Township, Watchung, Westfield

== District 22 ==
For the 2026–2027 session, the 22nd legislative district of the New Jersey Legislature is represented in the State Senate by Nicholas Scutari (D, Linden) and in the General Assembly by Linda S. Carter (D, Plainfield) and James J. Kennedy (D, Rahway).

Clark, Cranford, Fanwood, Linden, North Plainfield, Plainfield, Rahway, Roselle Park, Scotch Plains, Winfield Township

== District 23 ==
For the 2026–2027 session, the 23rd legislative district of the New Jersey Legislature is represented in the State Senate by Doug Steinhardt (R, Lopatcong Township) and in the General Assembly by John DiMaio (R, Hackettstown) and Erik Peterson (R, Franklin Township).

Alexandria Township, Alpha, Bedminster, Belvidere, Bethlehem Township, Blairstown Township, Bloomsbury, Bound Brook, Bridgewater Township, Franklin Township (Hunterdon County), Franklin Township (Warren County), Frelinghuysen Township, Glen Gardner, Greenwich Township, Hackettstown, Hampton, Hardwick Township, Harmony Township, Holland Township, Hope Township, Knowlton Township, Lebanon Township, Liberty Township, Lopatcong Township, Mansfield Township, Manville, Milford, Oxford Township, Phillipsburg, Pohatcong Township, Raritan, Somerville, Union Township, Washington Borough, Washington Township, White Township

== District 24 ==
For the 2026–2027 session, the 24th legislative district of the New Jersey Legislature is represented in the State Senate by Parker Space (R, Wantage Township) and in the General Assembly by Dawn Fantasia (R, Franklin) and Mike Inganamort (R, Chester Township).

Allamuchy, Andover, Andover Township, Branchville, Byram Township, Chester, Chester Township, Frankford Township, Franklin, Fredon Township, Green Township, Hamburg, Hampton Township, Hardyston Township, Hopatcong, Independence, Lafayette Township, Montague Township, Mount Olive Township, Netcong, Newton, Ogdensburg, Roxbury, Sandyston Township, Sparta Township, Stanhope, Stillwater Township, Sussex, Vernon Township, Walpack Township, Wantage Township, Washington Township

== District 25 ==
For the 2026–2027 session, the 25th legislative district of the New Jersey Legislature is represented in the State Senate by Anthony M. Bucco (R, Boonton Township) and in the General Assembly by Aura K. Dunn (R, Mendham Borough) and Marisa Sweeney (D, Morristown).

Boonton Township, Butler, Dover, Harding, Jefferson Township, Kinnelon, Madison, Mendham, Mendham Township, Mine Hill Township, Morris Township, Morristown, Mount Arlington, Randolph Township, Rockaway, Rockaway Township, Victory Gardens, West Milford, Wharton

== District 26 ==
For the 2026–2027 session, the 26th legislative district of the New Jersey Legislature is represented in the State Senate by Joseph Pennacchio (R, Rockaway Township) and in the General Assembly by Brian Bergen (R, Denville Township) and Jay Webber (R, Morris Plains).

Bloomingdale, Boonton, Denville Township, East Hanover Township, Florham Park, Hanover Township, Lincoln Park, Montville Township, Morris Plains, Mountain Lakes, Parsippany-Troy Hills, Pequannock Township, Pompton Lakes, Ringwood, Riverdale, Wanaque

== District 27 ==
For the 2026–2027 session, the 27th legislative district of the New Jersey Legislature is represented in the State Senate by John F. McKeon (D, West Orange) and in the General Assembly by Rosy Bagolie (D, Livingston) and Alixon Collazos-Gill (D, Montclair).

Clifton, Livingston, Millburn, Montclair, Roseland, West Orange

== District 28 ==
For the 2026–2027 session, the 28th legislative district of the New Jersey Legislature is represented in the State Senate by Renee Burgess (D, Irvington) and in the General Assembly by Chigozie Onyema (D, Newark) and Cleopatra Tucker (D, Newark).

Hillside, Irvington, Maplewood, Newark (partial), South Orange

== District 29 ==
For the 2026–2027 session, the 29th legislative district of the New Jersey Legislature is represented in the State Senate by Teresa Ruiz (D, Newark) and in the General Assembly by Eliana Pintor Marin (D, Newark) and Shanique Speight (D, Newark).

East Newark, Harrison, Newark (partial)

== District 30 ==
For the 2026–2027 session, the 30th legislative district of the New Jersey Legislature is represented in the State Senate by Robert Singer (R, Lakewood Township) and in the General Assembly by Sean T. Kean (R, Wall Township) and Avi Schnall (D, Lakewood Township).

Avon-by-the-Sea, Belmar, Farmingdale, Howell Township, Lake Como, Lakewood Township, Wall

== District 31 ==
For the 2026–2027 session, the 31st legislative district of the New Jersey Legislature is represented in the State Senate by Angela V. McKnight (D, Jersey City) and in the General Assembly by William Sampson (D, Bayonne) and Jerry Walker (D, Jersey City).

Bayonne, Jersey City (partial), Kearny

== District 32 ==
For the 2026–2027 session, the 32nd legislative district of the New Jersey Legislature is represented in the State Senate by Raj Mukherji (D, Jersey City) and in the General Assembly by Ravinder Bhalla (D, Hoboken) and Katie Brennan (D, Jersey City).

Hoboken, Jersey City (partial)

== District 33 ==
For the 2026–2027 session, the 33rd legislative district of the New Jersey Legislature is represented in the State Senate by Brian P. Stack (D, Union City) and in the General Assembly by Gabe Rodriguez (D, West New York) and Larry Wainstein (D, North Bergen).

Guttenberg, North Bergen, Secaucus, Union City, Weehawken, West New York

== District 34 ==
For the 2026–2027 session, the 34th legislative district of the New Jersey Legislature is represented in the State Senate by Britnee Timberlake (D, East Orange) and in the General Assembly by Carmen Morales (D, Belleville) and Michael Venezia (D, Bloomfield).

Belleville, Bloomfield, East Orange, Glen Ridge, Nutley, Orange

== District 35 ==
For the 2026–2027 session, the 35th legislative district of the New Jersey Legislature is represented in the State Senate by Benjie Wimberly (D, Paterson) and in the General Assembly by Al Abdelaziz (D, Paterson) and Kenyatta Stewart (D, Paterson).

Elmwood Park, Garfield, Haledon, North Haledon, Paterson, Prospect Park

== District 36 ==
For the 2026–2027 session, the 36th legislative district of the New Jersey Legislature is represented in the State Senate by Paul Sarlo (D, Wood-Ridge) and in the General Assembly by Clinton Calabrese (D, Cliffside Park) and Gary Schaer (D, Passaic).

Carlstadt, Cliffside Park, East Rutherford, Edgewater, Fairview, Lyndhurst, North Arlington, Passaic, Ridgefield, Rutherford, Wallington, Wood-Ridge

== District 37 ==
For the 2026–2027 session, the 37th legislative district of the New Jersey Legislature is represented in the New Jersey Senate by Gordon M. Johnson (D, Englewood) and in the General Assembly by Shama Haider (D, Tenafly) and Ellen Park (D, Englewood Cliffs).

Bogota, Englewood, Englewood Cliffs, Fort Lee, Hackensack, Leonia, Palisades Park, Ridgefield Park, Teaneck, Tenafly

== District 38 ==
For the 2026–2027 session, the 38th legislative district of the New Jersey Legislature is represented in the State Senate by Joseph Lagana (D, Paramus) and in the General Assembly by Lisa Swain (D, Fair Lawn) and Chris Tully (D, Bergenfield).

Bergenfield, Fair Lawn, Glen Rock, Hasbrouck Heights, Little Ferry, Lodi, Maywood, Moonachie, New Mildford, Oradell, Paramus, River Edge, Rochelle Park, Saddle Brook, South Hackensack, Teterboro

== District 39 ==
For the 2026–2027 session, the 39th legislative district of the New Jersey Legislature is represented in the State Senate by Holly Schepisi (R, River Vale) and in the General Assembly by Robert Auth (R, Old Tappan) and John V. Azzariti (R, Saddle River).

Allendale, Alpine, Closter, Cresskill, Demarest, Dumont, Emerson, Harrington Park, Haworth, Hillsdale, Ho-Ho-Kus, Mahwah, Midland Park, Montvale, Northvale, Norwood, Oakland, Old Tappan, Park Ridge, Ramsey, River Vale, Rockleigh, Saddle River, Upper Saddle River, Waldwick, Washington Township, Westwood, Woodcliff Lake

== District 40 ==
For the 2026–2027 session, the 40th legislative district of the New Jersey Legislature is represented in the State Senate by Kristin Corrado (R, Totowa) and in the General Assembly by Al Barlas (R, Cedar Grove) and Christopher DePhillips (R, Wyckoff).

Caldwell, Cedar Grove, Essex Fells, Franklin Lakes, Fairfield, Hawthorne, Little Falls Township, North Caldwell, Ridgewood, Totowa, Verona, Wayne, Woodland Park, Wyckoff
