= Carl Orechio =

American politician

Carl A. Orechio (September 12, 1914 – December 28, 1991) was an American Republican Party politician, who served in the New Jersey General Assembly from 1972 to 1982.

== Career ==
Orechio was elected to the State Assembly in 1971, running in Essex County District 11C with the support of the Essex County Republican organization. He received 7,651 votes in the Republican primary, and his running mate, John N. Dennis, got 6,592 votes. They defeated incumbent Republican Assemblyman Ralph R. Caputo (2,098 votes) and his running mate, David B. Ford (1,567 votes) Two years earlier, Fiore had defeated Carl Orechio's brother, Carmen Orechio, a Democrat, for the same Assembly seat. In the general election, Orechio and Dennis easily Democrats Peter A. Torre, Jr. and David Conrad.

He was re-elected to a second term in the Democratic landslide of 1973, running in the newly created 27th district, which included northern Essex County suburbs of Nutley, Montclair, Bloomfield, Glen Ridge, Verona, Caldwell, Essex Fells and Cedar Grove. In the general election, Orechio was narrowly re-elected, 27,395 votes to 26,877 votes, against Democrat James J. Mills of Glen Ridge. The top vote getter in that race was Democrat Robert Ruane with 28,465 votes. Dennis finished fourth with 25,764 votes. His brother, Democrat Carmen Orechio, was elected State Senator from the same district, defeating two-term Republican Senator Michael A. Giuliano.

He won re-election to a third term in 1975, with 26,773 votes. Dennis was again elected, beating Ruane 26,471 to 23,404; Democrat Herbert Lev finished fourth with 18,886 votes.

In 1977, Dennis ran for the Senate against Carmen Orechio. Carl Orechio and his running mate, Roger L. Toner, won the Republican primary, with 8,555 and 7,063 votes, respectively, against 1976 congressional candidate Charles A. Poekel, Jr. (3,752 votes) and Vincent M. Iannuzzelli (2,461 votes). In the general election, Orechio was the top vote getter with 26,943 votes, followed by Democrat A. Joseph "Buddy" Fortunato, the son-in-law of Italian Tribune editor and former White House photographer Ace Alagna, with 25,212. Toner got 23,479 and Diane Horowitz got 23,411.

In June 1977, Orechio was a candidate for Essex County Republican Chairman, but was defeated for the post by John Renna.

Orechio was elected to the State Assembly for a fifth time in 1979, finishing second behind Fortunato. Losing were Republican Anthony Gallo, a Bloomfield councilman, and Democrat Robert W. Noonan of Montclair. He did not seek re-election in 1981.

In 1986, Orechio won the Republican nomination for Essex County Executive. He dropped out of the race after the primary and was replaced by Nicholas R. Amato, who then defeated the incumbent, Peter Shapiro.

New Jersey General Assembly
Preceded by Ralph R. Caputo; C. Richard Fiore	Member of the New Jersey General Assembly from the 11-C district 1972–1974; Served alongside: John N. Dennis	Succeeded by District abolished
Preceded by District created	Member of the New Jersey General Assembly from the 27th district 1974–1982; Served alongside: Robert M. Ruane, John N. Dennis, Buddy Fortunato	Succeeded by Mildred Barry Garvin; Harry A. McEnroe
