= Mildred Barry Garvin =

American politician

- Garvin in 1984

Member of the New Jersey General Assembly
- In office January 10, 1978 – January 12, 1988
- Preceded by: Eldridge Hawkins
- Succeeded by: Stephanie R. Bush
- Constituency: 26th district (1978–82); 27th district (1982–88)

Personal details
- Born: November 29, 1929 Chicago, Illinois
- Died: June 13, 1993 (aged 63)
- Party: Democratic

Mildred Barry Garvin (November 29, 1929 – June 13, 1993) was an American Democratic Party politician who served in the New Jersey General Assembly, from 1978 to 1988, representing the 26th Legislative District until 1982 and the 27th Legislative District thereafter.

== Biography ==
Garvin was born on November 29, 1929, in Chicago, where she attended DuSable High School. She enrolled at the University of Illinois and William Paterson State College. Garvin worked as Director of Special Projects and Internships in the Department of Public Administration at Rutgers University. She was the first African American on the board of education of the East Orange School District, eventually serving as the board's president, and was the first African American to serve on the board of directors of the East Orange Public Library.

Garvin won the June 1977 Democratic Party primary for the Assembly from the 26th District together with Richard Codey after incumbent Eldridge Hawkins unsuccessfully challenged Frank J. Dodd for his seat in the New Jersey Senate. After being elected to the Assembly, Garvin was appointed to serve on the Education Committee, building on her 12 years of service on the East Orange Board of Education. In redistricting following the 1980 United States census, Garvin was shifted to the 27th District, where she served three terms of office. In 1987, Garvin lost the support of the Essex County Democratic Committee resulting in her mounting an outside challenge from her in the June primary of the organization-backed incumbent Harry A. McEnroe and newcomer Stephanie R. Bush. Garvin came in third place in the primary election. Garvin challenged Codey in the 1991 Democratic primary for State Senate, losing to the incumbent by a margin of 60.9%-39.1%.

In 1991, she was selected as President of the NAACP of the Oranges and Maplewood, which had previously honored her with its Community Service Award. She served as coordinating legislator for the National Black Caucus of State Legislators and the National Conference of State Legislatures.

== Honors and awards ==
She received the State Family Planning Legislator's Recognition Award, the Mary Senatore Award from the Essex County Federation of Democratic Women and the Exemplary State Officials Award from the Morris County Chapter of the Association of Black Educators.

== Legacy ==
After her death on June 13, 1993, Governor of New Jersey James Florio issued an executive order recognizing Garvin and ordering that flags of all State departments and offices should be flown at half staff on June 15 and 16 in her memory. The New Jersey Historical Commission established the Mildred Barry Garvin Prize to honor educators in the state for outstanding teaching of African-American history.
