= Dominic A. Cavicchia =

American politician

New Jersey State Assemblyman
- In office January 1939 – January 1945
- Preceded by: Raymond W. Schroeder
- Succeeded by: Minna P. Greenbaum

Assembly Speaker
- In office January 1944 – January 1945
- Preceded by: Manfield G. Amlicke
- Succeeded by: Freas L. Hess

Assembly Majority Leader
- In office January 1943 – January 1944

Director of the New Jersey Division of Alcoholic Beverage Control
- In office July 1, 1952 – February 14, 1954
- Preceded by: Irwin B. Hock
- Succeeded by: William Howe Davis

Essex County Supervisor of Transfer Inheritance Tax (Acting)
- In office January 1931 – January 1937
- Preceded by: Peter A. Cavicchia
- Succeeded by: Peter A. Cavicchia

Personal details
- Born: Dominic Angelo Cavicchia; January 18, 1901 Newark, New Jersey, U.S.
- Died: August 18, 1982 (aged 81) Newark, New Jersey, U.S.
- Party: Republican
- Spouse: Marion D. Holgate
- Relations: Peter A. Cavicchia (Brother)
- Education: New York University; New Jersey Law School

Dominic Angelo Cavicchia (January 18, 1901 – August 18, 1983) was an American Republican Party politician who served as Speaker of the New Jersey General Assembly.

== Early life ==
Cavicchia was born January 18, 1901, in Newark, New Jersey. He was a 1919 graduate of East Side High School in Newark. He was a graduate of New York University and New Jersey Law School. His brother, Peter Angelo Cavicchia (1879-1967), served in the U.S. House of Representatives from 1931 to 1937 and was the first Italian American to represent New Jersey in Congress. During Peter Cavicchia's six years as a Congressman, Dominic Cavicchia took over his job as Essex County Supervisor of Transfer Inheritance Tax. Peter Cavicchia resumed his old job after his defeat in the 1936 election.

== Political career ==
In 1938, Cavicchia was elected to the New Jersey State Assembly, representing Essex County. He was re-elected in 1939, 1940, 1941, 1942, and 1943. He served as Assembly Majority Leader in 1943 and as Assembly Speaker in 1944. He spent four years as the leader of the Essex County delegation. He was a member of the New Jersey State Commission on Post War Economic Welfare. In 1939, he was a member of the Legislature's Joint Committee to Investigate the Administration of Emergency Relief. He was a member of the Joint Legislative Committee to Study New Jersey's Potable Water Problem in 1940, and in 1941 and 1942, he was a member of the Joint Legislative Committee on Railroad Taxation. He served on the Joint Legislative Committee to hold public hearings on the revision of the New Jersey Constitution. He was not a candidate for re-election in 1945. Among the Democrats Cavicchia defeated in the 1940 Assembly race was Peter W. Rodino, who would later serve 40 years in Congress.

In 1952, Governor Alfred Driscoll appointed Cavicchia to serve as Director of the New Jersey Division of Alcoholic Beverages. He held that post until 1954 when the newly elected Democratic Governor, Robert B. Meyner, replaced him with William Howe Davis.

== Family and Retirement ==
Cavicchia was married to Marion D. Holgate (1902-1994) and had three children. Cavicchia was living in Berkeley Heights, New Jersey, at the time of his death on August 18, 1983.

Preceded by Manfield G. Amlicke	Speaker of the New Jersey General Assembly; 1950– 1950	Succeeded by Freas L. Hess
