= Nia Gill =

Member of the New Jersey Senate

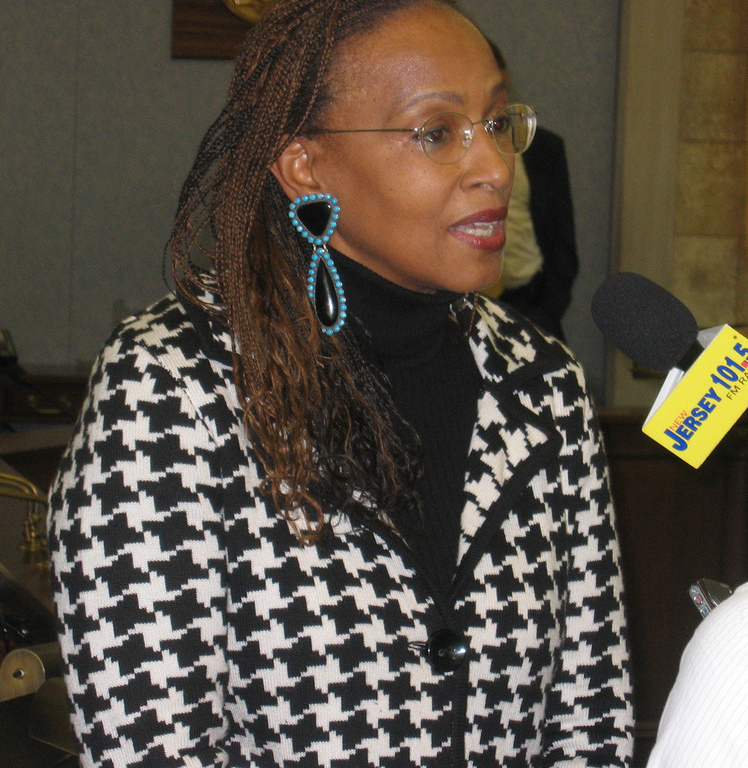

Member of the New Jersey Senate from the 34th district
- In office January 8, 2002 – January 9, 2024
- Preceded by: Norman M. Robertson
- Succeeded by: Britnee Timberlake

President pro tempore of the New Jersey Senate
- In office January 12, 2010 – January 9, 2018
- Preceded by: Shirley Turner
- Succeeded by: Teresa Ruiz

Member of the New Jersey General Assembly from the 27th district
- In office January 11, 1994 – January 8, 2002
- Preceded by: Robert Brown; Quilla Talmadge
- Succeeded by: Mims Hackett; John F. McKeon

Personal details
- Born: March 15, 1948 (age 78) Glen Ridge, New Jersey, U.S.
- Party: Democratic
- Education: Upsala College (BA); Rutgers University, Newark (JD)
- Website: State Senate website

Nia H. Gill (born March 15, 1948) is an American attorney and Democratic Party politician, who represented the 34th Legislative District in the New Jersey Senate from 2002 to 2024. She ran unsuccessfully as a candidate in the June 2012 primary election to fill the seat in Congress left vacant by the death of Donald M. Payne, the former U.S. Representative for New Jersey's 10th congressional district. Gill was the State Senate President pro Tempore from 2010 to 2018, succeeded by Teresa Ruiz.

== Early life ==
Gill was born on March 15, 1948, in Glen Ridge, New Jersey. She graduated from Montclair High School. She attended Upsala College, receiving a B.A. in history and political history. She was awarded a J.D. from the Rutgers Law School.

== Career ==
Gill was a law clerk for Essex County Superior Court Judge Harry Hazelwood, Jr. and as a public defender in Essex and Passaic counties. She is an attorney with the firm of Gill & Cohen, P.C. together with former Assembly member Neil M. Cohen of the 20th Legislative District.

Gill served in the lower house of the New Jersey Legislature, the General Assembly, from 1994 to 2002, where she was Minority Whip from 1996 to 2001. She also served in the Assembly on the Speaker's Education Funding Task Force and several committees including, the Assembly Democratic Senior Citizen Task Force (as co-chair) and the Assembly Advisory Committee on the Arts, History and Humanities.

Gill became a candidate for State Senate in District 34 after some of the municipalities she had represented in the Assembly were shifted into the district. Most of the communities added to District 34, which at the time was a Republican stronghold and had been for nearly two decades prior, were heavily Democratic and contributed to Gill's landslide victory over first-time incumbent Norman M. Robertson. In the 2003 primaries, LeRoy J. Jones, Jr. was given the party line opposing Gill. Despite being outspent by Jones in the heavily Democratic district, Gill won with 55% of the vote. Senator Gill has been re-elected six times, winning elections in 2003, 2007, 2011, 2013, 2017, and 2021. Gill, along with the other 39 state senators, was required to run for her seat after two years due to the election cycle outlined in the New Jersey Constitution requiring a two-year Senate term after decennial redistricting.

She was the Senate President Pro Tempore from 2010 to 2017.

Gill is a sponsor of the measure recently signed into law to criminalize the deprivation of civil rights by public officials, making racial profiling a state crime. She has also sponsored the New Jersey Civil Rights Act, which would give individuals a remedy whenever one person deprives another person of any rights, privileges, or immunities or interferes with another's civil rights. Additionally, she sponsored a resolution to formally rescind an 1868 effort by the New Jersey Legislature to withdraw New Jersey's support for the Fourteenth Amendment to the United States Constitution and its due process and equal protection provisions.

Gill sponsored legislation that provides a $3,000 income tax deduction for certain families providing home care for an elderly relative, legislation that abolishes the death penalty in New Jersey and has also sponsored legislation allowing PAAD recipients freedom of choice in selecting a pharmacy and prohibits the imposition of a mail order system. The Senator also sponsored legislation that establishes a central registry of domestic violence orders for use in evaluating firearm permit applications, and sponsored legislation to upgrade crimes of the third degree. In addition, Senator Gill is the first African American and the first woman in the history of New Jersey named to serve on the powerful Senate Judiciary Committee.

Gill is generally recognized as being one of the leading abortion rights advocates in New Jersey politics. One significant example is her opposition to the override of then-Governor Christie Whitman's veto of the New Jersey Partial-Birth Abortion Ban Act of 1997 in the New Jersey Assembly.

=== Senatorial courtesy ===
On June 4, 2007, Governor Corzine announced and filed his intent to nominate Stuart Rabner to be the next Chief Justice of the New Jersey Supreme Court, replacing James R. Zazzali, who was nearing mandatory retirement age. Before the formal nomination, two members of the New Jersey Senate from Essex County, where Rabner resides, were said to be blocking consideration of his confirmation by invoking "senatorial courtesy", a Senate tradition that allows home county legislators to intercede to prevent consideration of a local nominee. On June 14, 2007, Governor Corzine officially nominated Rabner for the post. State Senator Ronald Rice withdrew his objections to Rabner's nomination on June 15, 2007, after a meeting with the governor. Fellow Senator Gill dropped her efforts to block Rabner's confirmation on June 19, 2007, after meeting with Rabner. While she did not respond to initial media requests to explain the nature of her concerns, anonymous lawmakers cited in The New York Times indicated that the objection was due to Rabner's lack of bench experience and Governor Corzine's failure to consider a minority candidate for the post.

After confirmation hearings, the Senate voted on June 21, 2007, to confirm Rabner as Chief Justice by a 36-1 margin, with Gill casting the lone dissenting vote, citing Rabner's lack of judicial experience and the fact that he had never argued a case in New Jersey's courts. Anne Milgram was confirmed by a 37-1 Senate vote to succeed Rabner as Attorney General.

In the 2022-23 legislative session, Gill served on the Legislative Oversight, the Law and Public Safety and the Transportation committees.

=== 2023 election ===
As a result of redistricting following the 2020 United States census, parts of Gill's 34th District became merged with parts of the 27th District, resulting in a Democratic primary election between her and 27th District incumbent Dick Codey for the 27th District seat. Gill lost the primary by 57.7% to 42.2%. However, although Codey won the primary, he later announced his retirement from the Senate and Assemblyman John F. McKeon became the Democratic candidate in the general election. Codey's decision to compete in the primary against Gill, only to later resign, has been criticized as a "backroom politics" maneuver to force Gill out, although state Democratic chair LeRoy Jones denied this.

== Other offices ==
New Jersey Governor-elect Jon Corzine said on November 11, 2005, that he would consider appointing Gill to fill his vacant seat in the United States Senate following his resignation to become Governor of New Jersey. He later chose Bob Menendez to fill the seat.

Gill was a candidate in the June 5, 2012, primary election to fill the seat in Congress left vacant by the death of Donald M. Payne, the former U.S. Representative for New Jersey's 10th congressional district. Also competing for that nomination was Dennis R. Flynn of Glen Ridge, Newark Councilmen Donald Payne Jr. (son of the congressman), Ronald C. Rice (son of State Senator Ronald Rice), Irvington Mayor Wayne Smith, and Cathy Wright of Newark. Payne won in a landslide, garnering 60% of the vote. Rice received 19%, Gill came in third with 17% and the other three candidates split the remaining 5% of the vote.

== Election history ==
New Jersey State Senate elections, 2013
Party	Candidate	Votes	%
Democratic	Nia H. Gill (incumbent)	27,132	73.1
Republican	Joseph S. Cupoli	9,972	26.9
Democratic hold			

New Jersey State Senate elections, 2011
Party	Candidate	Votes	%
Democratic	Nia H. Gill (incumbent)	17,118	79.6
Republican	Ralph Bartnik	4,386	20.4
Democratic hold			

New Jersey State Senate elections, 2007
Party	Candidate	Votes	%
Democratic	Nia H. Gill (incumbent)	17,178	100.0
Democratic hold			

New Jersey Senate
Preceded by Shirley Turner	President pro tempore of the New Jersey Senate; 2010–2018	Succeeded by Teresa Ruiz
