= Mila Jasey =

Member of the New Jersey General Assembly

Mila M. Jasey

Member of the New Jersey General Assembly from the 27th district
- In office November 8, 2007 – January 9, 2024 Serving with John F. McKeon
- Preceded by: Mims Hackett
- Succeeded by: Garnet Hall

Personal details
- Born: May 29, 1951 (age 75) Madison, Wisconsin
- Party: Democratic
- Spouse: Neil
- Children: 3
- Education: Barnard College (B.A.); Pace University (M.S.)
- Website: www.njleg.state.nj.us/legislative-roster/284/assemblywoman-jasey

Mila M. Jasey (born May 29, 1951) is an American Democratic Party politician who represented the 27th Legislative District in the New Jersey General Assembly from 2007 to 2024.

== Early life and education ==
Jasey was born in Madison, Wisconsin on May 29, 1951, and raised in Minnesota and California, where she attended the local public schools. She graduated with a B.A. from Barnard College in History, and was awarded an M.S. from the Lienhard School of Nursing at Pace University.

Jasey was a trustee of the South Orange-Maplewood School District Board of Education from 1999 to 2007.

She lives in South Orange with her husband Neil; they have three grown children together.

== New Jersey General Assembly ==
Jasey was sworn into the Assembly on September 10, 2007, filling the seat that had been vacated by Mims Hackett.

Jasey was one of the lead authors of New Jersey's Interdistrict Public School Choice Program in 2010. Jasey was one of the authors of the New Jersey law that allows private schools in urban areas to convert to charters.

=== Committees ===
Committee assignments for the current session are:

- Higher Education, as Chair
- Education, as Vice-Chair
- Aging and Senior Services
- Joint Committee on the Public Schools

=== District 27 ===
Each of the 40 districts in the New Jersey Legislature has one representative in the New Jersey Senate and two members in the New Jersey General Assembly. The representatives from the 27th District for the 2022—23 Legislative Session were:

- Senator Richard Codey (D)
- Assemblyman John F. McKeon (D)
- Assemblywoman Mila Jasey (D)

New Jersey General Assembly
Preceded by Mims Hackett	Member of the New Jersey General Assembly for the 27th District; November 8, 2007 – present With: John F. McKeon	Succeeded by Incumbent
