= Richard Codey =

American politician (1946–2026)

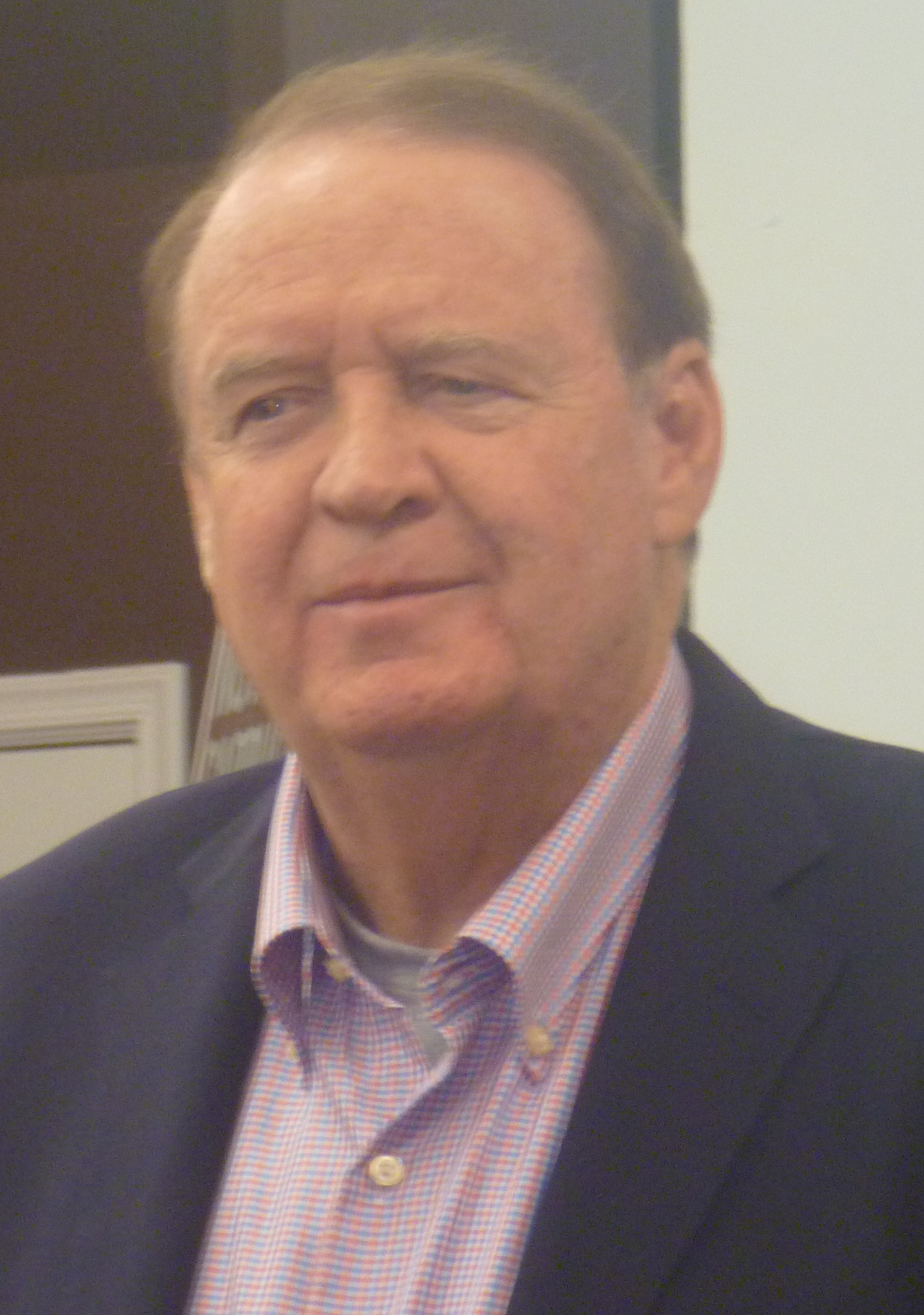
- Codey in 2011

53rd Governor of New Jersey
- In office November 15, 2004 – January 17, 2006
- Preceded by: Jim McGreevey
- Succeeded by: Jon Corzine
- Acting; January 12, 2002 – January 15, 2002
- Preceded by: John O. Bennett (acting)
- Succeeded by: Jim McGreevey

Member of the New Jersey Senate from the 27th district
- In office January 10, 1982 – January 9, 2024
- Preceded by: Carmen A. Orechio
- Succeeded by: John F. McKeon

111th and 113th President of the New Jersey Senate
- In office January 8, 2008 – January 12, 2010
- Preceded by: Bernard Kenny
- Succeeded by: Stephen Sweeney
- In office January 8, 2002 – January 7, 2008 Serving with John Bennett (January 8, 2002 – January 13, 2004)
- Preceded by: Donald DiFrancesco
- Succeeded by: Bernard Kenny

Minority Leader of the New Jersey Senate
- In office January 13, 1998 – January 8, 2002
- Preceded by: John A. Lynch Jr.
- Succeeded by: Leonard Lance (2004)

Member of the New Jersey General Assembly from the 26th district
- In office January 8, 1974 – January 12, 1982
- Preceded by: Constituency established
- Succeeded by: Leanna Brown; Dean Gallo

Personal details
- Born: Richard James Codey; November 27, 1946 Orange, New Jersey, U.S.
- Died: January 11, 2026 (aged 79) Roseland, New Jersey, U.S.
- Party: Democratic
- Spouse: Mary Rolli (m. 1981)
- Education: Fairleigh Dickinson University (BA)

Richard James Codey (November 27, 1946 – January 11, 2026) was an American politician who served as the 53rd governor of New Jersey from 2004 to 2006. A member of the Democratic Party, he served in the New Jersey Senate from 1982 to 2024 and as the President of the Senate from 2002 to 2010. He represented the 27th Legislative District, which covered the western portions of Essex County and the southeastern portion of Morris County.

Codey is the longest-serving state legislator in New Jersey history, having served in the New Jersey Legislature continuously from January 8, 1974, to January 9, 2024.

== Early life and education ==
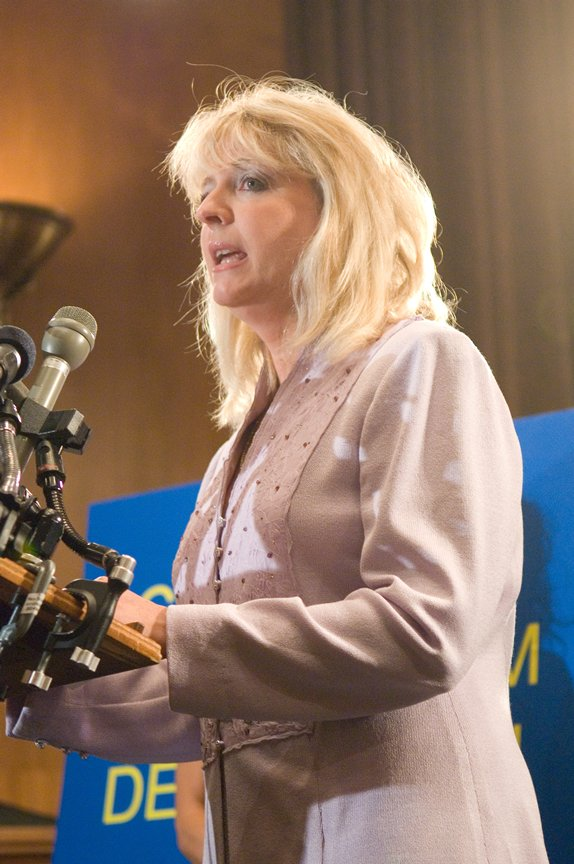
Codey's wife and former New Jersey First Lady, Mary Jo Codey

Codey was born on November 27, 1946, in Orange, New Jersey, where his family owned a funeral home. He attended Our Lady of the Valley High School and transferred to Orange High School before switching to Oratory Preparatory School in Summit, from which he graduated.

Codey took over his father's job as a licensed funeral director. When his father, Donald, became the county coroner, Codey was drafted to help with death scene pickups. Codey remembered, "I was 14, taking bodies out of train wrecks. You grow up quick".

In 1981, he earned a bachelor's degree from Fairleigh Dickinson University.

== New Jersey Assembly ==
Codey left the funeral trade to try his hand in politics in 1973 when he was first elected to the State Assembly, with Eldridge Hawkins as his running mate. He served in the Assembly from 1974 to 1982.

== New Jersey Senate ==
Codey was first elected to the State Senate in 1981. He rose through the ranks to become Senate President. He first ascended to that post in 2002 and remained in it until 2010. He served on the Legislative Services Commission.

=== Return to Senate service ===
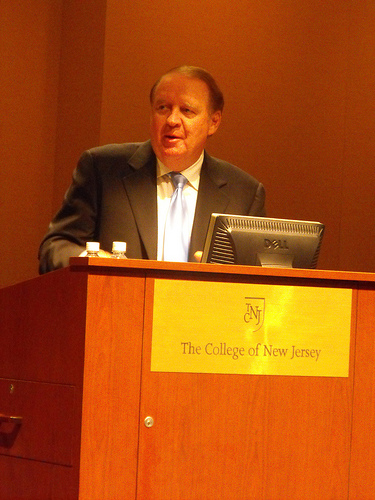
Codey in October 2008

Codey became acting governor of New Jersey upon the resignation of Jim McGreevey on November 15, 2004. He served the remainder of McGreevey's unexpired term, remaining governor until January 17, 2006.

Instead of running for a full term as governor, Codey was re-elected to the New Jersey Senate in 2007.

In 2009, Codey "was ousted from the Senate president post in a deal brokered by South Jersey Democratic Party leader George E. Norcross III, the state's most powerful unelected Democrat and Codey's arch political enemy for years".

In December 2016, Codey was one of several Catholic legislators who supported legislation legalizing assisted suicide.

== Governor of New Jersey ==
=== 2002 ===
Following Governor Christine Todd Whitman's resignation in 2001 to become head of the EPA, Codey was one of three different senate presidents to serve as acting governor within the one-year period between Whitman's resignation and Jim McGreevey's inauguration in January 2002. Codey served in that capacity for three days, from January 12, 2002, to January 15, 2002.

=== 2004 to 2006 ===
Codey became acting governor again with the resignation of Jim McGreevey on November 15, 2004.

On June 6, 2005, Codey announced revised nutrition guidelines for all state funded public and private schools, eliminating soda, candy, and other products with sugar as the leading ingredient from cafeteria offerings. The law became effective on September 1, 2007.

On November 8, 2005, a constitutional amendment creating the position of lieutenant governor of New Jersey was passed. The amendment took effect in the 2009 election. Codey is the last person to serve simultaneously as governor and senate president.

On January 9, 2006, Codey became governor (no longer acting governor) as a result of his signing legislation that provided that a person who serves as acting governor for a continuous period of at least 180 days will be "Governor of the State of New Jersey" for official and historical purposes. This law was made retroactive to 2001, covering both Codey's service after McGreevey's resignation and the service of Donald DiFrancesco following the resignation of Governor Christine Todd Whitman in 2001. This made DiFrancesco New Jersey's 51st governor and Codey the 53rd.

Codey appointed Mary Jane Cooper to be New Jersey's first-ever Inspector General, a position created to root out waste and mismanagement in government. Codey added $7 million in new funding to agencies devoted to public accountability, per the recommendations that resulted from an audit of state ethics codes that he commissioned. In March 2005, Codey cracked down on pay to play when he signed a law banning campaign contributions by businesses holding state contracts in several circumstances.

As governor, Codey championed a bill to ban smoking from indoor spaces in the state, more money for stem cell research, increased funding for mental health, and sports. Codey created a task force to recommend ways to end steroid abuse in high school and college sports in the state. The task force established drug testing for high school athletes on teams that play in the championships, with the state paying for the drug testing program. He also successfully negotiated for MetLife Stadium, which was constructed jointly by the New York Giants and New York Jets.

In December 2005, Codey announced he was not accepting a new state slogan recommended by the State Commerce Department, following a study by a marketing consultant, which was paid for by the state. He said he felt the slogan "We'll win you over" made the state seem desperate. Governor Codey openly solicited slogan suggestions from citizens and then chose five finalists, which he opened to a vote from the public. Days prior to leaving the governor's office, Codey announced the winner: "New Jersey: Come See for Yourself".

Shortly before leaving the governor's office, Codey signed the state's first legislative moratorium on capital punishment enacted by any state in the nation. The moratorium ended with the permanent ban of capital punishment by Codey's successor, Jon Corzine.

Codey served the remainder of McGreevey's unexpired term, remaining governor until January 17, 2006.

=== Cabinet ===
- Virginia Bauer, Secretary of Commerce, Economic Growth and Tourism
- George Hayman, Acting Commissioner of Corrections (as of January 3, 2006)
- Donald Bryan, Acting Commissioner of Banking and Insurance
- Peter Cammarano, Chief of staff to the governor
- Bradley Campbell, Commissioner of Environmental Protection
- Thomas Carver, Commissioner of Labor and Workforce Development (until October 2005)
- James Davy, Commissioner of Human Services
- Lucille Davy, Acting Commissioner of Education (from September 2005)
- Paul Fader, Chief Counsel to the governor
- Jeanne Fox, President of the Board of Public Utilities
- Col. Joseph Fuentes, Superintendent of the State Police
- Peter C. Harvey, State Attorney General
- Dr. Fred Jacobs, Commissioner of Health and Senior Services
- Charles Kuperus, Secretary of Agriculture
- John Lettiere, Commissioner of Transportation
- Susan Bass Levin, Commissioner of Community Affairs (until June 2005)
- William Librera, Commissioner of Education (until September 2005)
- John McCormac, State Treasurer
- Charles Richman, Acting Commissioner of Community Affairs (from June 2005)
- Major Gen. Glenn K. Rieth, Adjutant General
- A.J. Sabath, Commissioner of Labor and Workforce Development (from October 2005)
- Seema Singh, Ratepayer Advocate
- Regena Thomas, Secretary of State of New Jersey
- Rolando Torres, Commissioner of Personnel

=== 2007 ===
On April 12, 2007, Codey became Acting Governor of New Jersey when Corzine was incapacitated due to serious injuries suffered in a car accident that day. Codey became acting governor since New Jersey did not have the position of lieutenant governor until after the 2009 election. Corzine resumed his duties as governor on May 7, 2007.

=== Public opinion summary ===
As Codey prepared to leave the governor's office, a January 2006 study showed that 48% of voters said the state was "on the wrong track", while 34% said it was headed in the right direction. However, though voters had a negative view of the direction of the state, their view of Gov. Codey was strongly positive. In that same study, 68% of voters who recognized Gov. Codey had a favorable opinion of him and the pollsters noted that the outgoing governor had "an impressive 5:1 ratio of favorable to unfavorable opinion".

The Obama administration approached Codey in 2009 to consider running for governor in Corzine's place if the incumbent withdrew from his reelection bid, citing polls showing that Codey led Republican Chris Christie. Corzine remained in the race and lost to Christie.

Even after being out of the governor's office for over five years, Codey continued to make headlines as a prospective candidate for that office. In a FDU PublicMind Poll released September 27, 2011, voters were asked "If you could pick a Democrat to run against Chris Christie for governor, who would you prefer?" Richard Codey came up as the most preferred candidate at 18% among other well-known Democrats like Cory Booker and Frank Pallone.

== Personal life and death ==
Codey was married to Mary Jo Codey. The Codeys had two sons together, Kevin and Chris.

Codey died at his home in Roseland, New Jersey, on January 11, 2026, at the age of 79 following a brief illness.

== Legacy ==
In 2005, South Mountain Arena ice rink, located next to Turtle Back Zoo in West Orange, New Jersey, was renamed to Richard J. Codey Arena in his honor.

== Electoral history ==
=== New Jersey Senate ===
New Jersey general election, 2021
Party	Candidate	Votes	%
Democratic	Richard Codey (Incumbent)	50,604	64.87
Republican	Adam Kraemer	27,409	35.13
Total votes		78,013	100.0

New Jersey general election, 2017
Party	Candidate	Votes	%	±%
Democratic	Richard Codey (Incumbent)	43,066	69.7	▲10.4
Republican	Pasquale Capozzoli	18,720	30.3	▼10.4
Total votes		61,786	100.0	

New Jersey general election, 2013
Party	Candidate	Votes	%	±%
Democratic	Richard Codey (Incumbent)	34,291	59.3	▼2.5
Republican	Lee S. Holtzman	23,581	40.7	▲2.5
Total votes		57,872	100.0	

New Jersey general election, 2011
Party	Candidate	Votes	%
Democratic	Richard Codey (Incumbent)	27,089	61.8
Republican	William H. Eames	16,741	38.2
Total votes		43,830	100.0

New Jersey general election, 2007
Party	Candidate	Votes	%	±%
Democratic	Richard Codey (Incumbent)	23,631	78.8	▲13.0
Republican	Joseph A. Fischer	6,368	21.2	▼13.0
Total votes		29,999	100.0	

New Jersey general election, 2003
Party	Candidate	Votes	%	±%
Democratic	Richard Codey (Incumbent)	17,220	65.8	▲1.1
Republican	Bobbi Joan Bennett	8,958	34.2	▲1.4
Total votes		26,178	100.0	

New Jersey general election, 2001
Party	Candidate	Votes	%
Democratic	Richard Codey (Incumbent)	35,237	64.7
Republican	Jared Silverman	17,871	32.8
African-Americans For Justice	Donald Page	1,359	2.5
Total votes		54,467	100.0

New Jersey general election, 1997
Party	Candidate	Votes	%	±%
Democratic	Richard Codey (Incumbent)	35,770	79.5	▲4.4
Republican	Richard R. Klattenberg	9,250	20.5	▼4.4
Total votes		45,020	100.0	

New Jersey general election, 1993
Party	Candidate	Votes	%	±%
Democratic	Richard Codey (Incumbent)	33,138	75.1	▲7.0
Republican	Dr. Zal Velez	10,979	24.9	▼7.0
Total votes		44,117	100.0	

New Jersey general election, 1991
Party	Candidate	Votes	%
Democratic	Richard Codey (Incumbent)	19,677	68.1
Republican	Eugene J. Byrne	9,202	31.9
Total votes		28,879	100.0

New Jersey general election, 1987
Party	Candidate	Votes	%	±%
Democratic	Richard Codey (Incumbent)	17,064	76.4	▲1.2
Republican	Felix Graziano	5,270	23.6	▼1.2
Total votes		22,334	100.0	

New Jersey general election, 1983
Party	Candidate	Votes	%	±%
Democratic	Richard Codey (Incumbent)	18,943	75.2	▲1.3
Republican	James J. Brown	6,255	24.8	▼1.3
Total votes		25,198	100.0	

New Jersey general election, 1981
Party	Candidate	Votes	%
Democratic	Richard Codey	30,403	73.9
Republican	Richard E. Koehler	10,737	26.1
Total votes		41,140	100.0

=== New Jersey Assembly ===
New Jersey general election, 1979
Party	Candidate	Votes	%	±%
Democratic	Richard Codey (Incumbent)	14,320	36.1	▼0.2
Democratic	Mildred Barry Garvin (Incumbent)	12,910	32.5	▼0.7
Republican	Leonard P. Messina Sr.	6,079	15.3	▼0.8
Republican	Timothy A. Gaylord Jr.	5,143	13.0	▼0.4
U.S. Labor	Janet C. Mandel	479	1.2	▲1.0
Libertarian	Richard S. Roth	445	1.1	▲0.8
U.S. Labor	Lynne Speed	320	0.8	▲0.6
Total votes		39,696	100.0	

New Jersey general election, 1977
Party	Candidate	Votes	%	±%
Democratic	Richard Codey (Incumbent)	25,605	36.3	▲0.4
Democratic	Mildred Barry Garvin	23,430	33.2	▲0.1
Republican	Daniel Di Benedetto	11,322	16.1	▲1.7
Republican	Jeffrey A. Gerson	9,484	13.4	▼0.2
Libertarian	Katherine E. Florentine	242	0.3	▼1.4
Libertarian	Richard S. Roth	204	0.3	N/A
U.S. Labor	Lynne Speed	127	0.2	▼1.2
U.S. Labor	Dennis Speed	117	0.2	N/A
Total votes		70,531	100.0	

New Jersey general election, 1975
Party	Candidate	Votes	%	±%
Democratic	Richard Codey (Incumbent)	22,618	35.9	▲0.2
Democratic	Eldridge Hawkins (Incumbent)	20,830	33.1	0.0
Republican	Conrad N. Koch	9,069	14.4	▼2.1
Republican	Raymond Findley Jr.	8,563	13.6	▼1.1
Libertarian	Kenneth R. Kaplan	1,069	1.7	N/A
U.S. Labor	Kenneth Mandel	852	1.4	N/A
Total votes		63,001	100.0	

New Jersey general election, 1973
Party	Candidate	Votes	%
Democratic	Richard Codey	30,282	35.7
Democratic	Eldridge Hawkins	28,102	33.1
Republican	John F. Trezza	13,978	16.5
Republican	Monroe Jay Lustbader	12,502	14.7
Total votes		84,864	100.0

New Jersey Senate
Preceded by John A. Lynch Jr.	Minority Leader of the New Jersey Senate; 1998–2022	Vacant Title next held by Leonard Lance; 2004
Political offices
Preceded by Donald DiFrancesco	President of the New Jersey Senate; 2002–2008; Served alongside: John Bennett (2002–2004)	Succeeded by Bernard Kenny
Preceded by Bernard Kenny	President of the New Jersey Senate; 2008–2010	Succeeded by Steve Sweeney
Preceded by John Bennett; Acting	Governor of New Jersey; Acting; 2002	Succeeded by Jim McGreevey
Preceded by Jim McGreevey	Governor of New Jersey; 2004–2006	Succeeded by Jon Corzine
