= 2012 United States House of Representatives elections in New Jersey =

- November 6, 2012

All 12 New Jersey seats to the United States House of Representatives
- Turnout: 67% (▲25pp)
	Majority party	Minority party
Party	Democratic	Republican
Last election	7	6
Seats won	6	6
Seat change	▼1	Steady
Popular vote	1,794,301	1,430,325
Percentage	54.67%	43.58%
Swing	▲4.93%	▼4.72%

Democratic
40–50%
50–60%
60–70%
70–80%
80–90%
Republican
40–50%
50–60%
60–70%

The 2012 United States House of Representatives elections in New Jersey were held on Tuesday, November 6, 2012, and elected the 12 U.S. representatives from the state of New Jersey, a loss of one seat following the 2010 United States census. The elections coincided with the elections of other federal and state offices, including a quadrennial presidential election and an election to the U.S. Senate.

== Overview ==
United States House of Representatives elections in New Jersey, 2012
Party	Votes	Percentage	Seats	+/–
Democratic	1,794,301	54.67%	6	-1
Republican	1,430,325	43.58%	6	-
Green	11,183	0.34%	0	-
Libertarian	9,396	0.29%	0	-
Others	36,573	1.11%	0	-
Totals	3,281,778	100.00%	12	-1

== Redistricting ==
Redistricting in New Jersey is the responsibility of the New Jersey Redistricting Commission, comprising six Democrats and six Republicans. If a majority of the 12 cannot reach an agreement, a neutral 13th person serves as a mediator or tie-breaker. On December 23, 2011, the commission voted 7–6 for a map supported by Republicans.

== District 1 ==
2012 New Jersey's 1st congressional district election
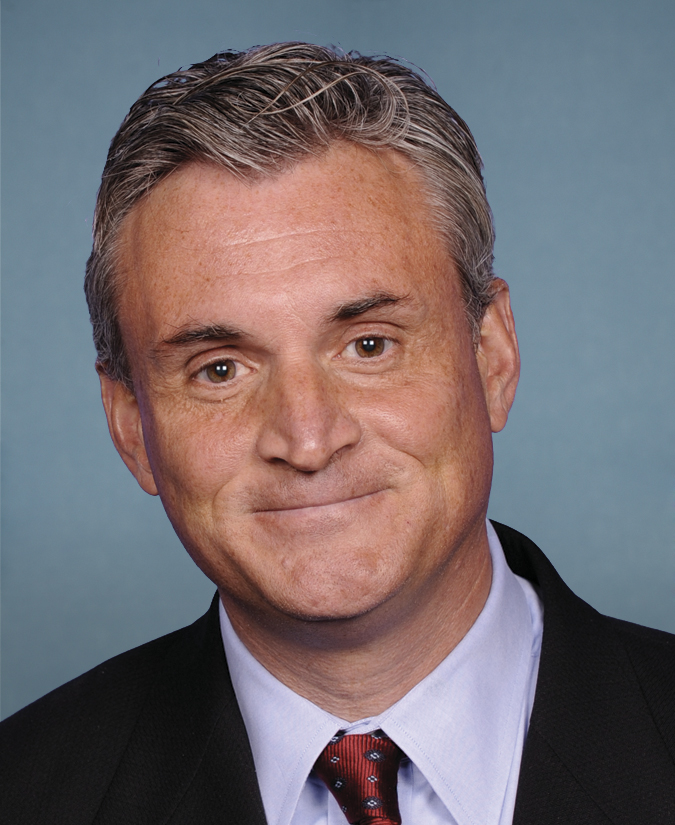

Nominee	Rob Andrews	Gregory Horton
Party	Democratic	Republican
Popular vote	210,470	92,459
Percentage	68.2%	30.0%
- Andrews: 50–60% 60–70% 70–80% 80–90% >90% Horton: 50–60% 60–70%
U.S. Representative before election
Rob Andrews
Democratic
Elected U.S. Representative
Rob Andrews
Democratic

In redistricting, Cherry Hill Township was added to the 1st district, while Riverton and parts of East Greenwich Township and Mantua Township were removed from the district. Democrat Rob Andrews, who had represented the 1st district since 1990, ran for re-election.

=== Democratic primary ===
==== Candidates ====
===== Nominee =====
- Rob Andrews, incumbent U.S. Representative

===== Eliminated in primary =====
- Francis Tenaglio, former Pennsylvania state Representative and candidate for Governor in 2005

===== Declined =====
- Frank Minor, Mayor of Logan Township
- Donald Norcross, state senator

==== Primary results ====
Democratic primary results
Party	Candidate	Votes	%
Democratic	Rob Andrews (incumbent)	21,318	88.4
Democratic	Francis Tenaglio	2,797	11.6
Total votes		24,115	100.0

=== Republican primary ===
==== Candidates ====
===== Nominee =====
- Gregory Horton, athletic director of Clearview Regional High School

==== Primary results ====
Republican primary results
Party	Candidate	Votes	%
Republican	Gregory Horton	11,189	100.0
Total votes		11,189	100.0

=== General election ===
==== Endorsements ====
Rob Andrews (D)

Labor unions

- AFL-CIO
- Fraternal Order of Police
- Health Professionals and Allied Employees
- National Association of Letter Carriers
- National Education Association
- Service Employees International Union

Organizations

- Clean Water Action
- Feminist Majority
- Human Rights Campaign
- Humane Society of the United States
- National Organization for Women
- Planned Parenthood Action Fund
- Sierra Club

==== Predictions ====
Source	Ranking	As of
The Cook Political Report	Safe D	November 5, 2012
Rothenberg	Safe D	November 2, 2012
Roll Call	Safe D	November 4, 2012
Sabato's Crystal Ball	Safe D	November 5, 2012
NY Times	Safe D	November 4, 2012
RCP	Safe D	November 4, 2012
The Hill	Safe D	November 4, 2012

==== Results ====
New Jersey's 1st congressional district, 2012
Party	Candidate	Votes	%
Democratic	Rob Andrews (incumbent)	210,470	68.2
Republican	Gregory Horton	92,459	30.0
Green	John Reitter	4,413	1.4
Reform	Margaret Chapman	1,177	0.4
Total votes		308,519	100.0
Democratic hold			

==== By county ====
County	Rob Andrews Democratic		Gregory Horton Republican		Various candidates Other parties		Margin		Total votes cast
County	#	%	#	%	#	%	#	%	Total votes cast
Burlington (part)	7,241	69.0%	3,162	30.1%	86	0.8%	4,079	38.9%	10,489
Camden (part)	148,085	71.1%	56,670	27.2%	3,384	1.6%	91,415	43.9%	208,149
Gloucester (part)	55,144	61.4%	32,627	36.3%	2,110	2.4%	22,517	25.1%	89,881
Totals	210,470	68.2%	92,459	30.0%	5,590	1.8%	118,011	38.2%	308,519

== District 2 ==
2012 New Jersey's 2nd congressional district election
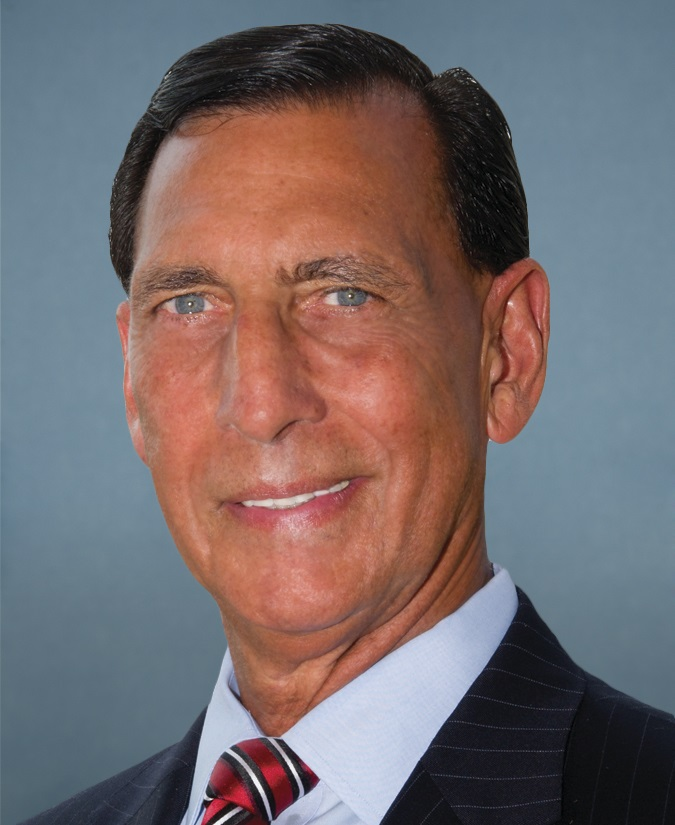

Nominee	Frank LoBiondo	Cassandra Shober
Party	Republican	Democratic
Popular vote	166,679	116,463
Percentage	57.7%	40.3%
- LoBiondo: 50–60% 60–70% 70–80% Shober: 40–50% 50–60% 60–70% 70–80% 80–90%
U.S. Representative before election
Frank LoBiondo
Republican
Elected U.S. Representative
Frank LoBiondo
Republican

In redistricting, Barnegat Light, Bass River Township, Beach Haven, Eagleswood Township, Harvey Cedars, Little Egg Harbor, Long Beach Township, Ship Bottom, Stafford Township, Surf City, Tuckerton, Washington Township and part of Mantua Township were added to the district. Republican Frank LoBiondo, who represented the 2nd district since 1995, sought re-election.

David W Bowen Sr., a businessman, a real estate investor and public speaker, ran as an independent.

Cassandra Shober, an office manager, won the Democratic nomination.

=== Republican primary ===
==== Candidates ====
===== Nominee =====
- Frank LoBiondo, incumbent U.S. Representative

===== Eliminated in primary =====
- Mike Assad, Absecon Board of Education member

==== Primary results ====
Republican primary results
Party	Candidate	Votes	%
Republican	Frank LoBiondo (incumbent)	20,551	87.6
Republican	Mike Assad	2,914	12.4
Total votes		23,465	100.0

=== Democratic primary ===
==== Candidates ====
===== Nominee =====
- Cassandra Shober, office manager

===== Eliminated in primary =====
- Viola Hughes, former mayor of Fairfield Township and nominee for this seat in 2006
- Gary Stein, candidate for the General Assembly in 2011

===== Declined =====
- Lou Greenwald, Majority Leader of the New Jersey General Assembly
- Jeff Van Drew, state senator
- Jim Whelan, state senator

==== Primary results ====
Democratic primary results
Party	Candidate	Votes	%
Democratic	Cassandra Shober	9,810	64.9
Democratic	Viola Hughes	3,971	26.3
Democratic	Gary Stein	1,327	8.8
Total votes		15,108	100.0

=== General election ===
==== Endorsements ====
Frank LoBiondo (R)

Labor unions

- AFL-CIO
- Fraternal Order of Police
- National Association of Letter Carriers

Organizations

- Humane Society of the United States
- National Right to Life Committee
- NRA Political Victory Fund
- United States Chamber of Commerce
Cassandra Shober (D)

Organizations

- National Organization for Women

==== Polling ====
Poll source	Date(s) administered	Sample size	Margin of error	Frank LoBiondo (R)	Cassandra Shober (D)	Other	Undecided
Stockton College	September 19–24, 2012	614	±4.0	55%	35%	1%	10%

==== Predictions ====
Source	Ranking	As of
The Cook Political Report	Safe R	November 5, 2012
Rothenberg	Safe R	November 2, 2012
Roll Call	Safe R	November 4, 2012
Sabato's Crystal Ball	Safe R	November 5, 2012
NY Times	Safe R	November 4, 2012
RCP	Safe R	November 4, 2012
The Hill	Safe R	November 4, 2012

==== Results ====
New Jersey's 2nd congressional district, 2012
Party	Candidate	Votes	%
Republican	Frank LoBiondo (incumbent)	166,679	57.7
Democratic	Cassandra Shober	116,463	40.3
Libertarian	John Ordille	2,699	0.9
Independent	Charles Lukens	1,329	0.5
Independent	David Bowen	1,010	0.3
Independent	Frank Faralli	892	0.3
Total votes		289,072	100.0
Republican hold			

==== By county ====
County	Frank LoBiondo Republican		Cassandra Shober Democratic		Various candidates Other parties		Margin		Total votes cast
County	#	%	#	%	#	%	#	%	Total votes cast
Atlantic	56,473	53.6%	46,854	44.5%	1,958	1.9%	9,619	9.1%	105,285
Burlington (part)	629	68.4%	274	29.8%	16	1.7%	355	38.6%	919
Camden (part)	2,479	53.9%	2,066	44.9%	53	1.1%	413	9.0%	4,597
Cape May	29,705	67.8%	13,209	30.1%	922	2.1%	16,496	37.7%	43,836
Cumberland	26,150	52.9%	22,258	45.0%	1,060	2.2%	3,892	7.9%	49,468
Gloucester (part)	22,151	56.9%	15,960	41.0%	792	2.0%	6,191	15.9%	38,903
Ocean (part)	10,943	63.3%	6,080	35.2%	268	1.6%	4,863	28.1%	17,291
Salem	18,147	63.1%	9,761	33.9%	862	3.0%	8,386	29.2%	28,770
Totals	166,677	57.7%	116,462	40.3%	5,930	2.1%	50,215	17.4%	289,069

== District 3 ==
2012 New Jersey's 3rd congressional district election
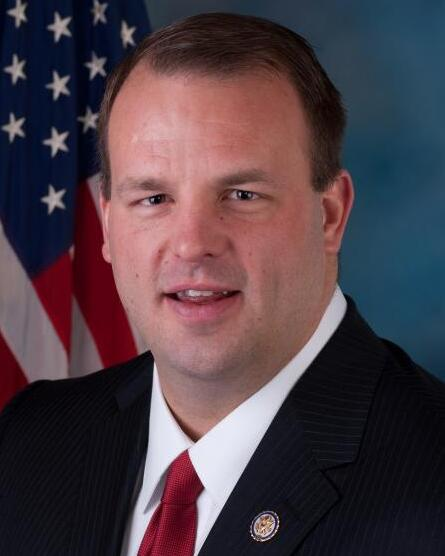

Nominee	Jon Runyan	Shelley Adler
Party	Republican	Democratic
Popular vote	174,253	145,509
Percentage	53.7%	44.9%
- Runyan: 40–50% 50–60% 60–70% 70–80% Adler: 50–60% 60–70% 80–90%
U.S. Representative before election
Jon Runyan
Republican
Elected U.S. Representative
Jon Runyan
Republican

In redistricting, the 3rd district was made more favorable to Republicans. Parts of Burlington County, including Riverton and Shamong Township, and Brick Township and Mantoloking in Ocean County were added to the district, while Cherry Hill and Bass River were removed. Republican Jon Runyan, who had represented the 3rd district since January 2011, sought re-election.

Frederick John LaVergne of Delanco, New Jersey, ran as a "Democratic-Republican" - the party designation of Jefferson, Madison, Monroe, and John Quincy Adams.

Robert Witterschein, an accountant, ran as an Independent.

=== Republican primary ===
==== Candidates ====
===== Nominee =====
- Jon Runyan, incumbent U.S. Representative

===== Declined =====
- Justin Murphy, former Tabernacle Township Committee Member and candidate for this seat in 2010

==== Primary results ====
Republican primary results
Party	Candidate	Votes	%
Republican	Jon Runyan (incumbent)	22,013	100.0
Total votes		22,013	100.0

=== Democratic primary ===
Former U.S. Representative John Adler, who represented the 3rd district from 2009 until 2011 but lost re-election in 2010, had planned to run again; however, he died in April 2011. Shelley Adler, an of counsel attorney and the widow of the former congressman, ran unopposed for the Democratic nomination. Thomas Sacks-Wilner, a medical doctor who was considering a bid for the Democratic nomination, declined to run.

==== Candidates ====
===== Nominee =====
- Shelley Adler, attorney and the widow of former U.S. Representative John Adler

===== Declined =====
- Thomas Sacks-Wilner, physician

==== Primary results ====
Democratic primary results
Party	Candidate	Votes	%
Democratic	Shelley Adler	15,176	100.0
Total votes		15,176	100.0

=== General election ===
==== Endorsements ====
Jon Runyan (R)

Labor unions

- Fraternal Order of Police
- International Association of Heat and Frost Insulators and Allied Workers
- International Union of Painters and Allied Trades
- National Association of Letter Carriers

Organizations

- National Republican Congressional Committee "Patriot" Program
- National Right to Life Committee
- NRA Political Victory Fund
- United States Chamber of Commerce
Shelley Adler (D)

Labor unions

- American Federation of Teachers
- Health Professionals and Allied Employees
- National Education Association
- Service Employees International Union

Organizations

- Clean Water Action
- Democratic Congressional Campaign Committee "Red to Blue" Program
- EMILY's List
- Environment America
- Feminist Majority
- Human Rights Campaign
- NARAL Pro-Choice America
- National Organization for Women
- Planned Parenthood Action Fund
- Sierra Club

==== Polling ====
Poll source	Date(s) administered	Sample size	Margin of error	Jon Runyan (R)	Shelley Adler (D)	Other	Undecided
Stockton College	September 28–October 2, 2012	614	±4.0	49%	39%	3%	9%
McLaughlin and Associates (R-Runyan)	September 17–18, 2012	400	±?	54%	34%	—	16%

==== Predictions ====
Source	Ranking	As of
The Cook Political Report	Lean R	November 5, 2012
Rothenberg	Likely R	November 2, 2012
Roll Call	Safe R	November 4, 2012
Sabato's Crystal Ball	Likely R	November 5, 2012
NY Times	Lean R	November 4, 2012
RCP	Lean R	November 4, 2012
The Hill	Likely R	November 4, 2012

==== Results ====
New Jersey's 3rd congressional district, 2012
Party	Candidate	Votes	%
Republican	Jon Runyan (incumbent)	174,253	53.7
Democratic	Shelley Adler	145,509	44.9
Independent	Robert Forchion	1,965	0.6
Independent	Robert Shapiro	1,104	0.3
Independent	Frederick John Lavergne	770	0.2
Independent	Robert Witterschein	530	0.2
Independent	Christopher Dennick	280	0.1
Total votes		324,411	100.0
Republican hold			

==== By county ====
County	Jon Runyan Republican		Shelley Adler Democratic		Various candidates Other parties		Margin		Total votes cast
County	#	%	#	%	#	%	#	%	Total votes cast
Burlington (part)	97,739	50.5%	94,178	48.6%	1,736	0.8%	3,561	1.9%	193,653
Ocean (part)	76,514	58.5%	51,328	39.3%	2,904	2.3%	25,186	19.2%	130,746
Totals	174,253	53.7%	145,506	44.9%	4,640	1.4%	28,747	8.8%	324,399

== District 4 ==
2012 New Jersey's 4th congressional district election
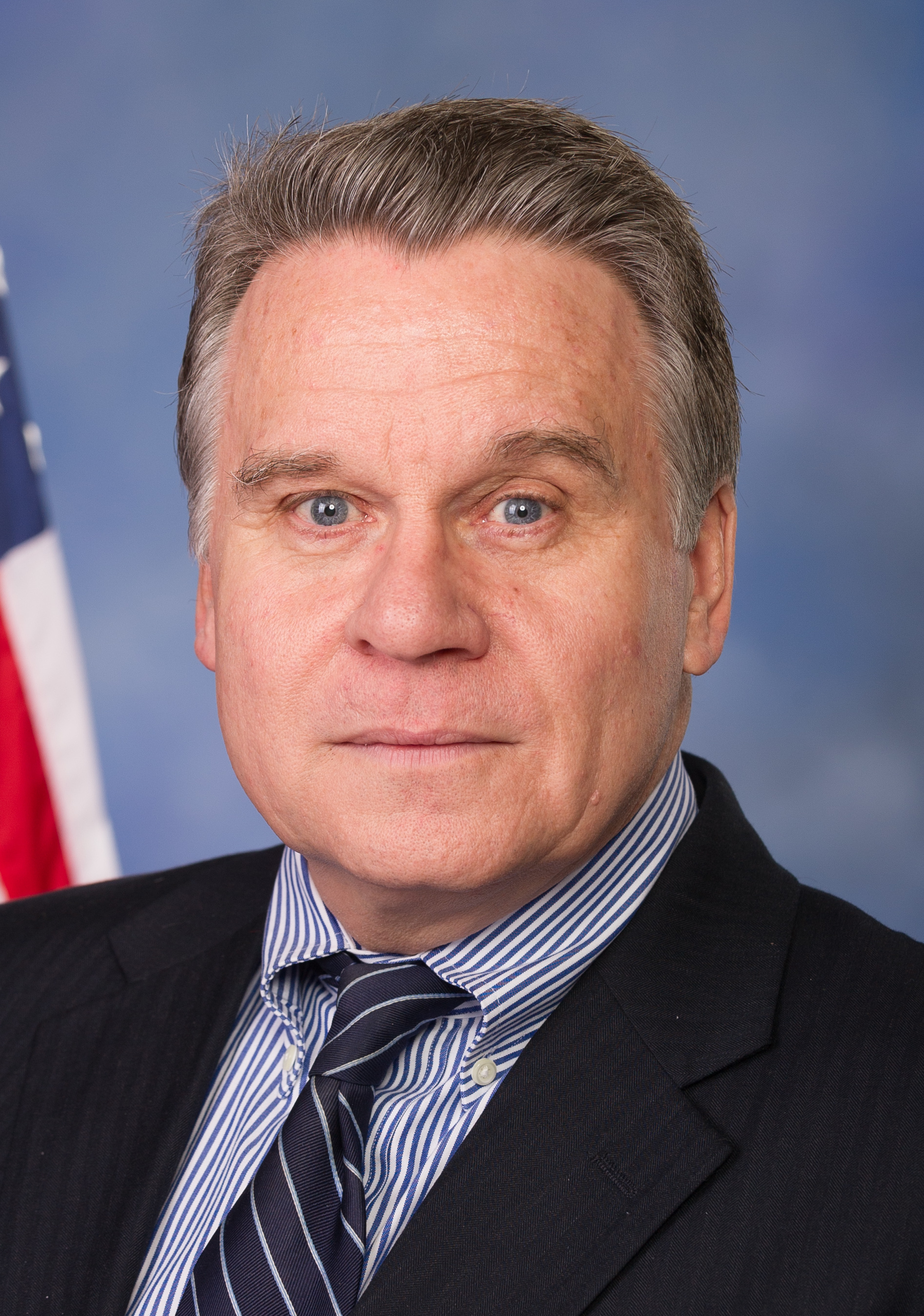

Nominee	Chris Smith	Brian Froelich
Party	Republican	Democratic
Popular vote	195,146	107,992
Percentage	63.7%	35.3%
- Smith: 40–50% 50–60% 60–70% 70–80% Froelich: 50–60% 60–70%
U.S. Representative before election
Chris Smith
Republican
Elected U.S. Representative
Chris Smith
Republican

In redistricting, the district lost all of its share of Burlington County, while gaining more of Republican-leaning Monmouth. Republican Chris Smith, who had represented the 4th congressional district since 1981, sought re-election.

=== Republican primary ===
==== Candidates ====
===== Nominee =====
- Chris Smith, incumbent U.S. Representative

===== Eliminated in primary =====
- Terrence McGowan, retired firefighter, police officer, and Navy SEAL

==== Primary results ====
Republican primary results
Party	Candidate	Votes	%
Republican	Chris Smith (incumbent)	21,520	83.6
Republican	Terrence McGowan	4,209	16.4
Total votes		25,729	100.0

=== Democratic primary ===
==== Candidates ====
===== Nominee =====
- Brian Froelich, retired executive and business consultant

===== Withdrew =====
- Patricia Bennett, attorney
- Doug DeMeo

==== Primary results ====
Democratic primary results
Party	Candidate	Votes	%
Democratic	Brian Froelich	12,110	100.0
Total votes		12,110	100.0

=== General election ===
==== Endorsements ====
Chris Smith (R)

Labor unions

- AFL-CIO
- Fraternal Order of Police
- National Association of Letter Carriers

Organizations

- Campaign for Working Families
- Humane Society of the United States
- National Right to Life Committee
Brian Froelich (D)

Labor unions

- National Education Association

Organizations

- Planned Parenthood Action Fund

==== Predictions ====
Source	Ranking	As of
The Cook Political Report	Safe R	November 5, 2012
Rothenberg	Safe R	November 2, 2012
Roll Call	Safe R	November 4, 2012
Sabato's Crystal Ball	Safe R	November 5, 2012
NY Times	Safe R	November 4, 2012
RCP	Safe R	November 4, 2012
The Hill	Safe R	November 4, 2012

==== Results ====
New Jersey's 4th congressional district, 2012
Party	Candidate	Votes	%
Republican	Chris Smith (incumbent)	195,146	63.7
Democratic	Brian Froelich	107,992	35.3
Independent	Leonard Marshall	3,111	1.0
Total votes		306,247	100.0
Republican hold			

==== By county ====
County	Chris Smith Republican		Brian Froelich Democratic		Leonard Marshall Independent		Margin		Total votes cast
County	#	%	#	%	#	%	#	%	Total votes cast
Mercer (part)	27,751	61.8%	16,727	37.3%	418	0.9%	11,024	24.5%	44,896
Monmouth (part)	109,506	61.6%	66,420	37.4%	1,762	1.0%	43,086	24.2%	177,688
Ocean (part)	57,888	69.2%	24,844	29.7%	931	1.1%	33,044	39.5%	83,663
Totals	195,145	63.7%	107,991	35.3%	3,111	1.0%	87,154	28.4%	306,247

== District 5 ==
2012 New Jersey's 5th congressional district election
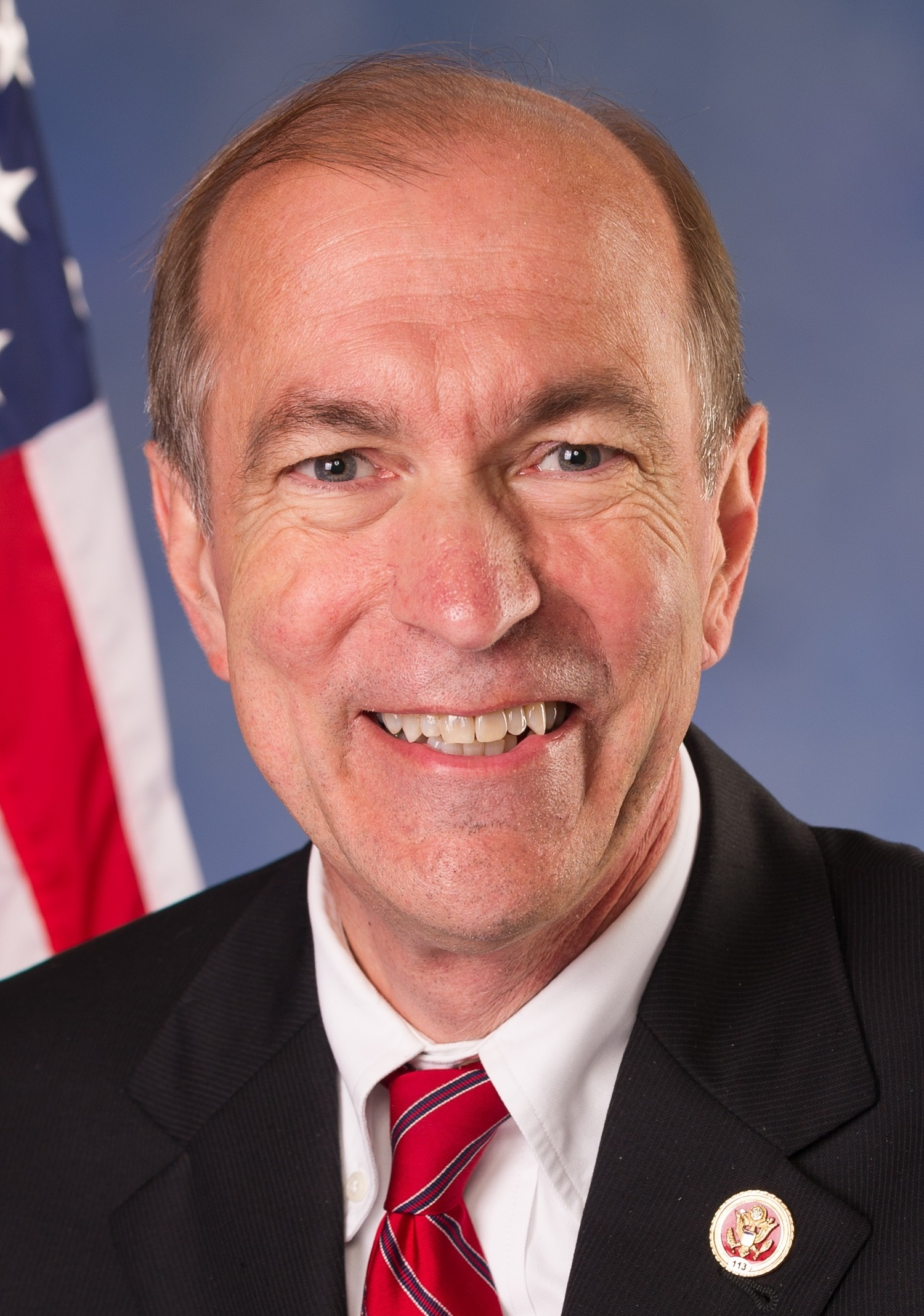

Nominee	Scott Garrett	Adam Gussen
Party	Republican	Democratic
Popular vote	167,501	130,100
Percentage	55.0%	42.8%
- Garrett: 40–50% 50–60% 60–70% 70–80% 80–90% Gussen: 40–50% 50–60% 60–70% 70–80%
U.S. Representative before election
Scott Garrett
Republican
Elected U.S. Representative
Scott Garrett
Republican

Republican Scott Garrett, who had represented the 5th district since 2003, successfully sought re-election. Michael Cino, an oil executive who challenged Garrett in the Republican primary in 2006, ran again. Garret won the Republican primary by a fairly comfortable margin.

Jason Castle, an it executive and Marine; Adam Gussen, the deputy mayor of Teaneck; and Diane Sare, all ran for the Democratic nomination to challenge Garrett. Gussen eventually won the primary.

Patricia Alessandrini ran as a candidate of the Green Party for the seat.

Mark Quick, a former member of the Warren County Republican Committee who challenged Garrett as an Independent in 2010, had stated that he would run as a candidate of the Reform Party of New Jersey. He withdrew from the race and did not qualify for the ballot.

=== Republican primary ===
==== Candidates ====
===== Nominee =====
- Scott Garrett, incumbent U.S. Representative

===== Eliminated in primary =====
- Michael Cino, oil executive and candidate for this seat in 2006
- Bonnie Somer, chorus director and LaRouche political organizer

==== Primary results ====
Republican primary results
Party	Candidate	Votes	%
Republican	Scott Garrett (incumbent)	24,709	87.2
Republican	Michael Cino	2,107	7.5
Republican	Bonnie Somer	1,511	5.3
Total votes		28.327	100.0

=== Democratic primary ===
==== Candidates ====
===== Nominee =====
- Adam Gussen, deputy mayor of Teaneck

===== Eliminated in primary =====
- Jason Castle, IT executive and Marine
- Diane Sare, LaRouche movement activist

===== Withdrew =====
- Terry Duffy, director of Passaic County Board of Chosen Freeholders (withdrew March 12)

===== Declined =====
- Harry Carson, former New York Giants linebacker
- Robert M. Gordon, state senator
- Leo McGuire, former Bergen County Sheriff
- Jim McQueeny, public relations executive and former News12 anchor
- Steve Rothman, incumbent U.S. Representative for the 9th district (running in the 9th district)
- Connie Wagner, Member of the General Assembly

==== Primary results ====
Democratic primary results
Party	Candidate	Votes	%
Democratic	Adam Gussen	10,208	54.9
Democratic	Jason Castle	6,448	34.7
Democratic	Diane Sare	1,925	10.4
Total votes		18,581	100.0

=== General election ===
==== Endorsements ====
Scott Garrett (R)

Organizations

- National Right to Life Committee
- NRA Political Victory Fund
- United States Chamber of Commerce

==== Predictions ====
Source	Ranking	As of
The Cook Political Report	Safe R	November 5, 2012
Rothenberg	Safe R	November 2, 2012
Roll Call	Safe R	November 4, 2012
Sabato's Crystal Ball	Safe R	November 5, 2012
NY Times	Safe R	November 4, 2012
RCP	Safe R	November 4, 2012
The Hill	Likely R	November 4, 2012

==== Results ====
New Jersey's 5th congressional district, 2012
Party	Candidate	Votes	%
Republican	Scott Garrett (incumbent)	167,501	55.0
Democratic	Adam Gussen	130,100	42.8
Green	Patricia Alessandrini	6,770	2.2
Total votes		304,371	100.0
Republican hold			

==== By county ====
County	Scott Garrett Republican		Adam Gussen Democratic		Patricia Alessandrini Green		Margin		Total votes cast
County	#	%	#	%	#	%	#	%	Total votes cast
Bergen (part)	110,351	50.9%	102,491	47.3%	4,051	1.9%	7,860	3.6%	216,893
Passaic (part)	10,026	61.6%	5,921	36.4%	321	2.0%	4,105	25.2%	16,268
Sussex (part)	28,984	66.5%	12,779	29.3%	1,832	4.2%	16,205	37.2%	43,595
Warren (part)	18,140	65.7%	8,909	32.3%	566	2.0%	9,231	33.4%	27,615
Totals	167,501	55.0%	130,100	42.7%	6,770	2.2%	37,401	12.3%	304,371

== District 6 ==
2012 New Jersey's 6th congressional district election
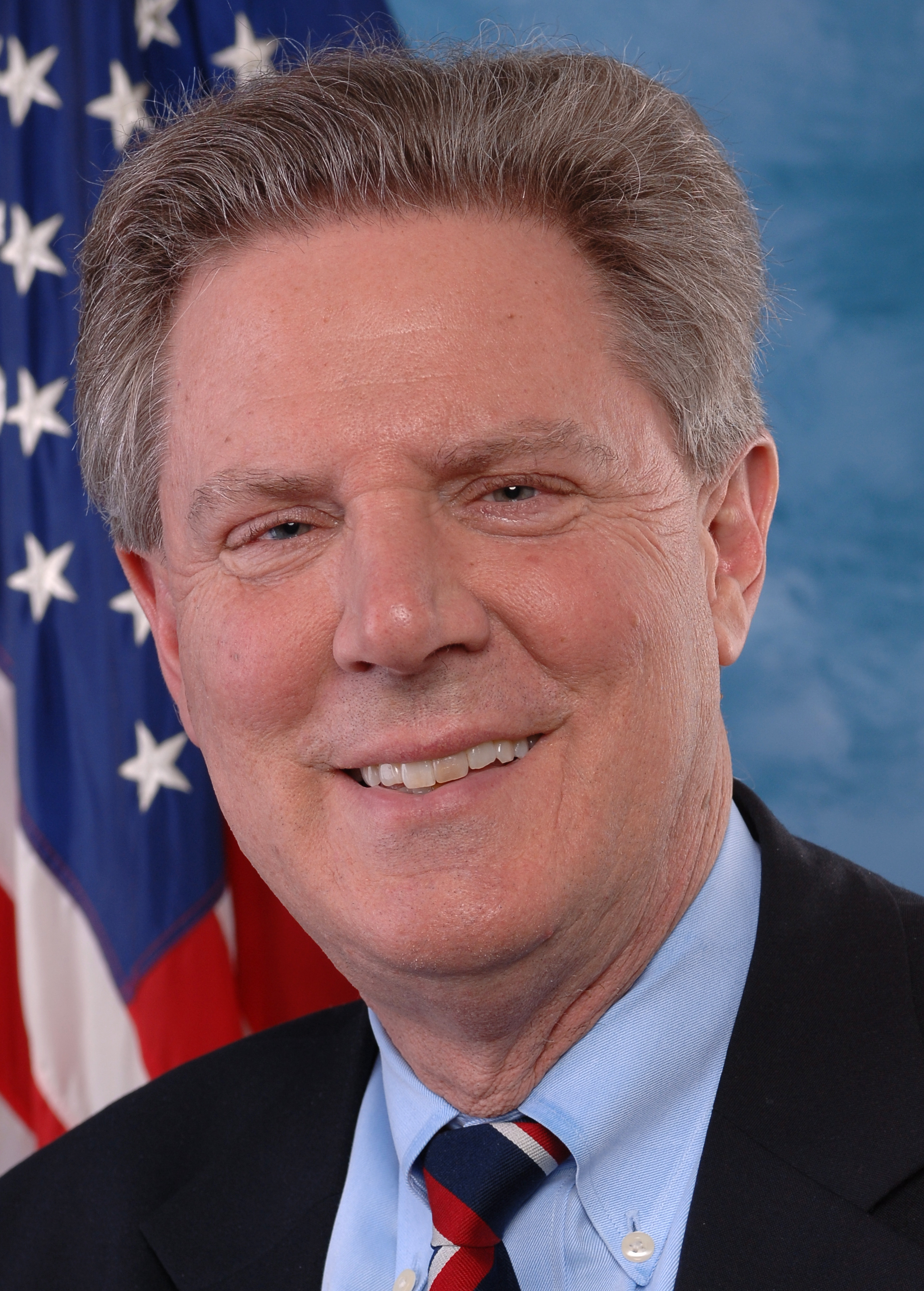

Nominee	Frank Pallone	Anna Little
Party	Democratic	Republican
Popular vote	151,782	84,360
Percentage	63.3%	35.2%
- Pallone: 50–60% 60–70% 70–80% 80–90% Little: 40–50% 50–60%
U.S. Representative before election
Frank Pallone
Democratic
Elected U.S. Representative
Frank Pallone
Democratic

Democrat Frank Pallone, who had represented the 6th district since 1993 (and previously represented the 3rd district from 1988 until 1993), sought re-election.

Anna Little, the former mayor of Highlands, who unsuccessfully challenged Pallone as the Republican nominee in 2010, won the Republican nomination to challenge Pallone.

=== Democratic primary ===
==== Candidates ====
===== Nominee =====
- Frank Pallone, incumbent U.S. Representative

==== Primary results ====
Democratic primary results
Party	Candidate	Votes	%
Democratic	Frank Pallone (incumbent)	16,593	100.0
Total votes		16,593	100.0

=== Republican primary ===
==== Candidates ====
===== Nominee =====
- Anna Little, former mayor of Highlands and nominee for this seat in 2010

===== Eliminated in primary =====
- Ernesto Cullari, small-business owner and orthopedic practitioner

==== Primary results ====
Republican primary results
Party	Candidate	Votes	%
Republican	Anna Little	7,692	70.1
Republican	Ernesto Cullari	3,277	29.9
Total votes		10,969	100.0

=== General election ===
==== Endorsements ====
Frank Pallone (D)

Labor unions

- AFL-CIO
- Fraternal Order of Police
- National Association of Letter Carriers
- National Education Association
- Service Employees International Union

Organizations

- Clean Water Action
- Environment America
- Feminist Majority
- Human Rights Campaign
- Humane Society of the United States
- National Organization for Women
- Planned Parenthood Action Fund
- Sierra Club
- Stonewall Democrats
Anna Little (R)

Organizations

- National Right to Life Committee

==== Predictions ====
Source	Ranking	As of
The Cook Political Report	Safe D	November 5, 2012
Rothenberg	Safe D	November 2, 2012
Roll Call	Safe D	November 4, 2012
Sabato's Crystal Ball	Safe D	November 5, 2012
NY Times	Safe D	November 4, 2012
RCP	Safe D	November 4, 2012
The Hill	Safe D	November 4, 2012

==== Results ====
New Jersey's 6th congressional district, 2012
Party	Candidate	Votes	%
Democratic	Frank Pallone (incumbent)	151,782	63.3
Republican	Anna Little	84,360	35.2
Libertarian	Len Flynn	1,392	0.6
Independent	Karen Zaletel	868	0.4
Independent	Mac Dara Lyden	830	0.3
Reform	Herbert Tarbous	406	0.2
Total votes		239,638	100.0
Democratic hold			

==== By county ====
County	Frank Pallone Democratic		Anna Little Republican		Various candidates Other parties		Margin		Total votes cast
County	#	%	#	%	#	%	#	%	Total votes cast
Middlesex (part)	106,632	67.9%	47,969	30.5%	2,506	1.6%	58,663	37.4%	157,107
Monmouth (part)	45,150	54.7%	36,391	44.1%	890	1.2%	8,759	10.6%	82,531
Totals	151,782	63.3%	84,360	35.2%	3,496	1.5%	67,422	28.1%	239,638

== District 7 ==
2012 New Jersey's 7th congressional district election
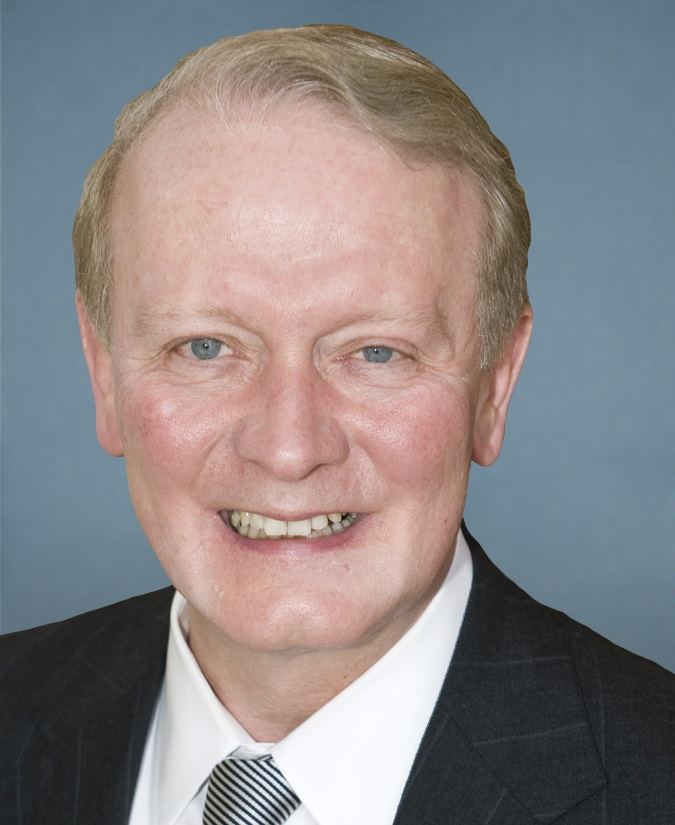

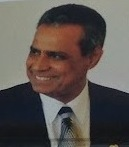
Nominee	Leonard Lance	Upendra J. Chivukula
Party	Republican	Democratic
Popular vote	175,662	123,057
Percentage	57.1%	40.1%
- Lance: 40–50% 50–60% 60–70% 70–80% Chivukula: 40–50% 50–60% 60–70%
U.S. Representative before election
Leonard Lance
Republican
Elected U.S. Representative
Leonard Lance
Republican

Republican Leonard Lance, who had represented the 7th district since 2009, ran for re-election. The 7th district was made more favorable to Republicans in redistricting, losing all of Democratic leaning Middlesex County, while now including all of heavily Republican Hunterdon.

State Assemblyman Upendra J. Chivukula ran unopposed for the Democratic nomination.

At least two other candidates had announced in 2011 that they would seek the Democratic nomination, but withdraw in the months before the filing deadline: Jun Choi, the former mayor of Edison, and Ed Potosnak, a chemistry teacher and entrepreneur who unsuccessfully ran for the seat in 2010. Following the redistricting process which placed Choi's town of Edison in the 6th district, Choi announced that he would not be a candidate for Congress in 2012 and endorsed incumbent Frank Pallone. On January 16, 2012, Potosnak announced that he was dropping out of the race to accept a position as executive director of the New Jersey League of Conservation Voters.

Patrick McKnight ran as the Libertarian candidate.

=== Republican primary ===
==== Candidates ====
===== Nominee =====
- Leonard Lance, incumbent U.S. Representative

===== Eliminated in primary =====
- David Larsen, businessman and candidate for this seat in 2010

==== Primary results ====
Republican primary election results
Party	Candidate	Votes	%
Republican	Leonard Lance (incumbent)	23,432	60.6
Republican	David Larsen	15,253	39.4
Total votes		38,685	100.0

=== Democratic primary ===
==== Candidates ====
===== Nominee =====
- Upendra J. Chivukula, Member of the General Assembly

===== Withdrew =====
- Jun Choi, former mayor of Edison (withdrew December 2011)
- Ed Potosnak, chemistry teacher entrepreneur and candidate for this seat in 2010 (withdrew January 16)

==== Primary results ====
Democratic primary results
Party	Candidate	Votes	%
Democratic	Upendra Chivukula	11,506	100.0
Total votes		11,506	100.0

=== General election ===
==== Endorsements ====
Leonard Lance (R)

Labor unions

- National Association of Letter Carriers

Organizations

- Humane Society of the United States
- National Right to Life Committee
- NRA Political Victory Fund
- United States Chamber of Commerce
Upendra Chivukula (D)

Labor unions

- Service Employees International Union

Organizations

- Democracy for America
- National Organization for Women

==== Predictions ====
Source	Ranking	As of
The Cook Political Report	Safe R	November 5, 2012
Rothenberg	Safe R	November 2, 2012
Roll Call	Safe R	November 4, 2012
Sabato's Crystal Ball	Safe R	November 5, 2012
NY Times	Safe R	November 4, 2012
RCP	Likely R	November 4, 2012
The Hill	Safe R	November 4, 2012

==== Results ====
New Jersey's 7th congressional district, 2012
Party	Candidate	Votes	%
Republican	Leonard Lance (incumbent)	175,662	57.1
Democratic	Upendra J. Chivukula	123,057	40.1
Independent	Dennis A. Breen	4,518	1.5
Libertarian	Patrick McKnight	4,078	1.3
Total votes		307,315	100.0
Republican hold			

==== By county ====
County	Leonard Lance Republican		Upendra Chivukula Democratic		Various candidates Other parties		Margin		Total votes cast
County	#	%	#	%	#	%	#	%	Total votes cast
Essex (part)	3,674	47.1%	3,926	50.4%	196	2.5%	-252	-3.3%	7,796
Hunterdon	39,445	63.2%	20,044	32.1%	2,954	4.7%	19,401	31.1%	62,443
Morris (part)	27,016	59.9%	17,301	38.3%	798	1.7%	9,715	21.6%	45,115
Somerset (part)	55,308	55.6%	41,689	41.9%	2,470	2.5%	13,619	13.7%	99,467
Union (part)	41,786	53.3%	34,798	44.4%	1,881	2.3%	6,988	8.9%	78,365
Warren	8,433	59.7%	5,299	37.5%	402	2.9%	3,134	22.2%	14,134
Totals	175,662	57.2%	123,057	40.0%	8,596	2.8%	52,605	17.2%	307,315

== District 8 ==
2012 New Jersey's 8th congressional district election
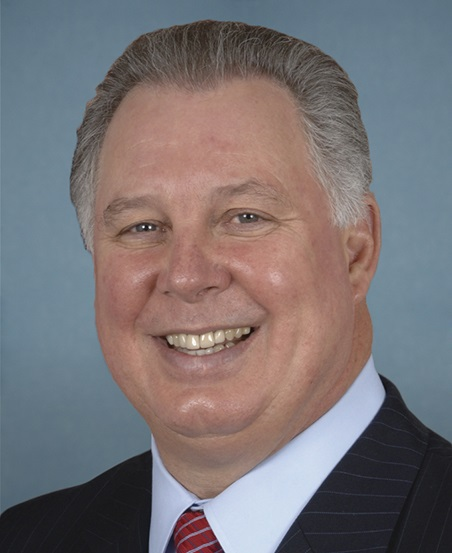

Nominee	Albio Sires	Maria Karczewski
Party	Democratic	Republican
Popular vote	130,857	31,767
Percentage	78.8%	19.1%
- Sires: 60–70% 70–80% 80–90%
U.S. Representative before election
Albio Sires
Democratic
Elected U.S. Representative
Albio Sires
Democratic

The new 8th district is the successor to the 13th district. Democrat Albio Sires, who had represented the 13th district since 2006, sought re-election in this district.

=== Democratic primary ===
==== Candidates ====
===== Nominee =====
- Albio Sires, incumbent U.S. Representative for the 13th District

===== Eliminated in primary =====
- Michael Shurin, computer programmer

==== Primary results ====
Democratic primary results
Party	Candidate	Votes	%
Democratic	Albio Sires (incumbent)	30,840	89.0
Democratic	Michael Shurin	3,808	11.0
Total votes		34,648	100.0

=== Republican primary ===
==== Candidates ====
===== Nominee =====
- Maria Karczewski, former Bayonne Local Redevelopment Authority commissioner

===== Withdrew =====
- Washington Flores
- Anthony Zanowic, independent candidate for the 13th district in 2010

==== Primary results ====
Republican primary results
Party	Candidate	Votes	%
Republican	Maria Karczewski	2,981	100.0
Turnout		2,981	100.0

=== General election ===
==== Endorsements ====
Albio Sires (D)

Labor unions

- AFL-CIO
- Fraternal Order of Police
- Health Professionals and Allied Employees
- National Association of Letter Carriers
- National Education Association
- Service Employees International Union

Organizations

- Human Rights Campaign
- Planned Parenthood Action Fund
- Sierra Club

==== Predictions ====
Source	Ranking	As of
The Cook Political Report	Safe D	November 5, 2012
Rothenberg	Safe D	November 2, 2012
Roll Call	Safe D	November 4, 2012
Sabato's Crystal Ball	Safe D	November 5, 2012
NY Times	Safe D	November 4, 2012
RCP	Safe D	November 4, 2012
The Hill	Safe D	November 4, 2012

==== Results ====
New Jersey's 8th congressional district, 2012
Party	Candidate	Votes	%
Democratic	Albio Sires (incumbent)	130,857	78.8
Republican	Maria Karczewski	31,767	19.1
Independent	Herbert Shaw	1,841	1.1
Independent	Stephen Deluca	1,710	1.0
Total votes		166,175	100.0
Democratic hold			

==== By county ====
County	Albio Sires Democratic		Maria Karczewski Republican		Various candidates Other parties		Margin		Total votes cast
County	#	%	#	%	#	%	#	%	Total votes cast
Bergen (part)	2,150	73.9%	724	24.9%	34	1.1%	1,426	49.0%	2,908
Essex (part)	25,770	80.9%	4,920	15.4%	1,182	3.7%	20,850	65.5%	31,872
Hudson (part)	85,088	76.4%	22,841	20.5%	3,404	3.0%	62,247	55.9%	111,333
Union (part)	17,845	82.7%	3,278	15.2%	456	2.1%	14,567	67.5%	21,579
Totals	130,853	78.0%	31,763	18.9%	5,174	3.1%	99,090	59.9%	167,790

== District 9 ==
2012 New Jersey's 9th congressional district election
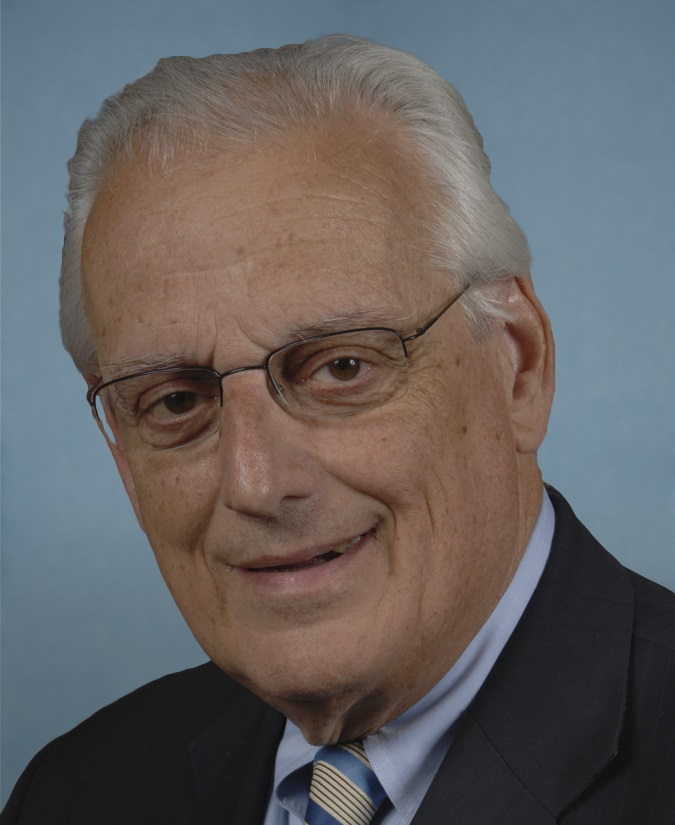

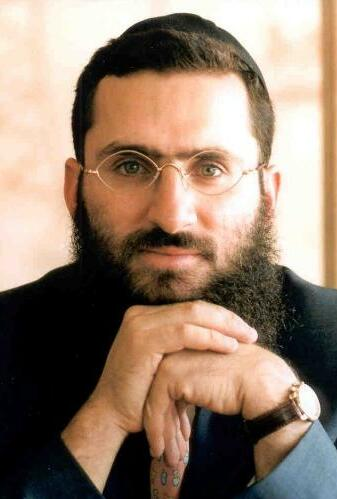
Nominee	Bill Pascrell	Shmuley Boteach
Party	Democratic	Republican
Popular vote	162,822	55,091
Percentage	74.0%	25.0%
- Pascrell: 50–60% 60–70% 70–80% 80–90% >90%
U.S. Representative before election
Bill Pascrell
Democratic
Elected U.S. Representative
Bill Pascrell
Democratic

Bill Pascrell, a Democrat who had represented the 8th district since 1997, and Steve Rothman, a Democrat who had represented the 9th district since 1997, both ran for the nomination in the new 9th district.

=== Democratic primary ===
==== Candidates ====
===== Nominee =====
- Bill Pascrell, incumbent U.S. Representative for the 8th District

===== Eliminated in primary =====
- Steve Rothman, incumbent U.S. Representative

===== Declined =====
- Michael Wildes, former mayor of Englewood (Endorsed Rothman)

==== Endorsements ====
Steve Rothman

Organizations

- NARAL Pro-Choice America

==== Primary results ====
2012 Democratic primary results by county: Pascrell: 90–100%; Rothman: 70–80%

Democratic primary results
Party	Candidate	Votes	%
Democratic	Bill Pascrell (incumbent)	31,435	61.2
Democratic	Steve Rothman (incumbent)	19,947	38.8
Total votes		51,382	100.0

=== Republican primary ===
==== Candidates ====
===== Nominee =====
- Shmuley Boteach, rabbi, author, and radio talk show host

===== Eliminated in primary =====
- Blase Billack, pharmaceutical sciences associate professor at St. John's University
- Hector Castillo, ophthalmologist and independent candidate for governor in 2005

==== Primary results ====
Republican primary results
Party	Candidate	Votes	%
Republican	Shmuley Boteach	5,364	57.9
Republican	Hector Castillo	2,623	28.3
Republican	Blase Billack	1,278	13.8
Total votes		9,265	100.0

=== General election ===
==== Campaign ====
In the general election, Pascrell faced Rabbi Shmuley Boteach. Pascrell raised more money than any other congressional candidate in the nation in 2012, $2.6 million, ten times what Boteach raised.

==== Endorsements ====
Bill Pascrell (D)

Labor unions

- AFL-CIO
- Fraternal Order of Police
- Health Professionals and Allied Employees
- National Association of Letter Carriers
- National Education Association
- Service Employees International Union

Organizations

- Clean Water Action
- Human Rights Campaign
- Humane Society of the United States
- Planned Parenthood Action Fund
- Sierra Club

==== Predictions ====
Source	Ranking	As of
The Cook Political Report	Safe D	November 5, 2012
Rothenberg	Safe D	November 2, 2012
Roll Call	Safe D	November 4, 2012
Sabato's Crystal Ball	Safe D	November 5, 2012
NY Times	Safe D	November 4, 2012
RCP	Safe D	November 4, 2012
The Hill	Likely D	November 4, 2012

==== Results ====
Pascrell won in the overwhelmingly Democratic district, where Democrats outnumbered Republicans by 3-to-1, by a margin of 73.6% to 25.4%.

New Jersey's 9th congressional district, 2012
Party	Candidate	Votes	%
Democratic	Bill Pascrell (incumbent)	162,822	74.0
Republican	Shmuley Boteach	55,091	25.0
Independent	E. David Smith	1,138	0.5
Constitution	Jeanette Woolsey	1,082	0.5
Total votes		220,133	100.0
Democratic hold			

==== By county ====
County	Bill Pascrell Democratic		Shmuley Boteach Republican		Various candidates Other parties		Margin		Total votes cast
County	#	%	#	%	#	%	#	%	Total votes cast
Bergen (part)	79,699	67.4%	37,520	31.7%	1,083	0.9%	42,179	35.7%	118,302
Hudson (part)	7,266	68.8%	3,070	29.1%	220	2.1%	4,196	39.7%	10,556
Passaic (part)	75,857	83.1%	14,501	15.9%	917	1.0%	61,356	67.8%	91,275
Totals	162,822	74.0%	55,091	25.0%	2,220	1.0%	107,731	49.0%	220,133

== District 10 ==
2012 New Jersey's 10th congressional district election
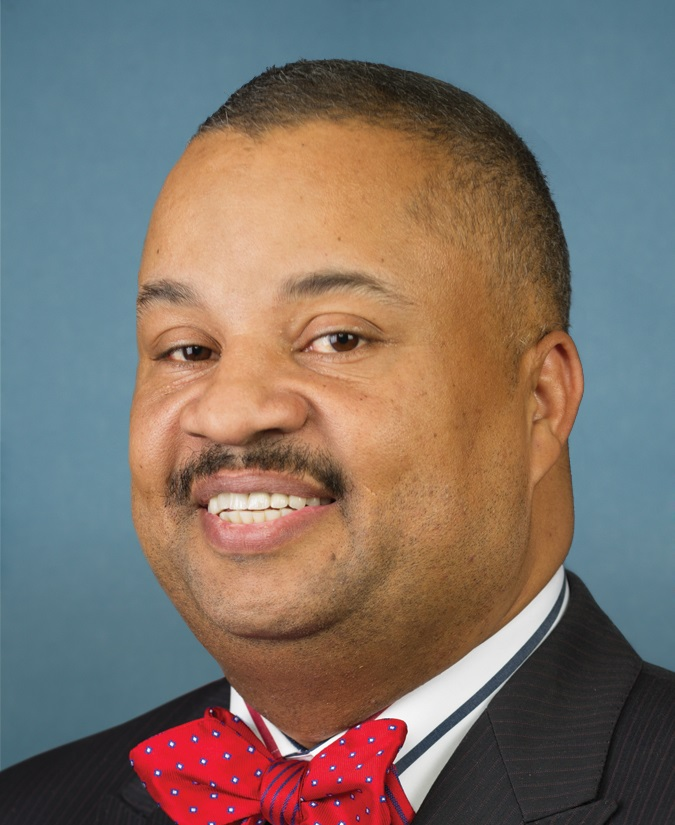

Nominee	Donald Payne Jr.	Brian Kelemen
Party	Democratic	Republican
Popular vote	201,435	24,271
Percentage	87.6%	10.5%
- Payne: 50–60% 60–70% 70–80% 80–90% >90%
U.S. Representative before election
Vacant
Elected U.S. Representative
Donald Payne Jr.
Democratic

Democrat Donald M. Payne, who had represented the 10th district since 1989, died on March 6, 2012. As a matter of convenience and cost-saving, a special election was held in conjunction with the regularly scheduled November general election. Voters were asked on the November ballot to select two candidates: one to serve the remainder of Payne's term in November and December, and the other candidate to serve the full two-year term beginning in January 2013.

On June 5, 2012, in the Democratic primary for the special election, Payne's son, Donald Payne Jr., defeated Ronald C. Rice (son of State Senator Ronald Rice) and Irvington Mayor Wayne Smith. In the Democratic primary for the full term, held on the same day, Payne Jr. competed against Rice, Smith, State Senator Nia Gill, Cathy Wright, and Dennis Flynn. He won in a landslide, garnering 60 percent of the vote. Rice received 19 percent, Gill 17 percent, and Smith, Flynn and Wright combined for about 5 percent of the vote.

In the general election held on November 6, 2012, Payne Jr. defeated Republican candidate Brian Kelemen and independent Joanne Miller for the special election to fill the remainder of his father's term.

=== Democratic primary ===
==== Candidates ====
===== Nominee =====
- Donald Payne Jr., president of the Newark Municipal Council, member of the Essex County Board of Chosen Freeholders, and son of former U.S. Representative Donald M. Payne

===== Eliminated in primary =====
- Dennis Flynn, Iraq War veteran
- Nia Gill, state senator
- Ronald C. Rice, member of the Newark Municipal Council
- Wayne Smith, Mayor of Irvington
- Cathy Wright, sales support manager

==== Primary results ====
Democratic primary results
Party	Candidate	Votes	%
Democratic	Donald Payne Jr.	36,576	59.6
Democratic	Ronald Rice	11,939	19.5
Democratic	Nia Gill	10,207	16.6
Democratic	Wayne Smith	1,356	2.2
Democratic	Dennis Flynn	779	1.3
Democratic	Cathy Wright	501	0.8
Total votes		61,358	100.0

=== Republican primary ===
==== Candidates ====
===== Nominee =====
- Brian Kelemen

==== Primary results ====
Republican primary results
Party	Candidate	Votes	%
Republican	Brian Kelemen	2,095	100.0
Total votes		2,095	100.0

=== General election ===
==== Endorsements ====
Donald Payne Jr. (D)

Labor unions

- AFL-CIO
- Fraternal Order of Police
- Health Professionals and Allied Employees
- National Association of Letter Carriers
- National Education Association
- Service Employees International Union

Organizations

- Feminist Majority
- Human Rights Campaign

==== Predictions ====
Source	Ranking	As of
The Cook Political Report	Safe D	November 5, 2012
Rothenberg	Safe D	November 2, 2012
Roll Call	Safe D	November 4, 2012
Sabato's Crystal Ball	Safe D	November 5, 2012
NY Times	Safe D	November 4, 2012
RCP	Safe D	November 4, 2012
The Hill	Safe D	November 4, 2012

==== Results ====
New Jersey's 10th congressional district, 2012
Party	Candidate	Votes	%
Democratic	Donald Payne Jr.	201,435	87.6
Republican	Brian Kelemen	24,271	10.5
Independent	Joanne Miller	3,127	1.4
Libertarian	Mick Erickson	1,227	0.5
Total votes		230,060	100.0
Democratic hold			

==== By county ====
County	Donald Payne Jr. Democratic		Brian Kelemen Republican		Various candidates Other parties		Margin		Total votes cast
County	#	%	#	%	#	%	#	%	Total votes cast
Essex (part)	128,526	91.8%	9,170	6.6%	2,251	1.6%	119,356	85.2%	139,947
Hudson (part)	34,420	83.5%	5,639	13.7%	1,138	2.8%	28,781	69.8%	41,197
Union (part)	38,489	78.7%	24,271	10.5%	965	2.0%	29,027	68.2%	48,916
Totals	201,435	87.6%	24,271	10.5%	4,354	1.9%	177,664	77.1%	230,060

== District 11 ==
2012 New Jersey's 11th congressional district election
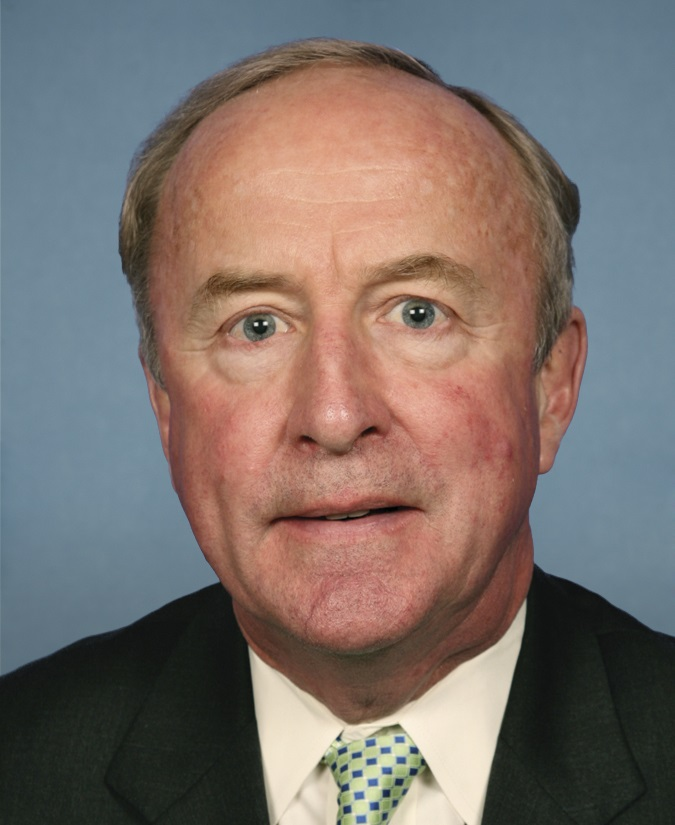

Nominee	Rodney Frelinghuysen	John Arvanites
Party	Republican	Democratic
Popular vote	182,239	123,935
Percentage	58.8%	40.0%
- Frelinghuysen: 40–50% 50–60% 60–70% 70–80% Arvanites: 50–60% 60–70% 70–80%
U.S. Representative before election
Rodney Frelinghuysen
Republican
Elected U.S. Representative
Rodney Frelinghuysen
Republican

Republican Rodney Frelinghuysen, who had represented the 11th district since 1995, sought re-election.

=== Republican primary ===
==== Candidates ====
===== Nominee =====
- Rodney Frelinghuysen, incumbent U.S. Representative

==== Primary results ====
Republican primary results
Party	Candidate	Votes	%
Republican	Rodney Frelinghuysen (incumbent)	30,831	100.0
Total votes		30,831	100.0

=== Democratic primary ===
==== Candidates ====
===== Nominee =====
- John Arvanites, former mayor of Roseland

==== Primary results ====
Democratic primary results
Party	Candidate	Votes	%
Democratic	John Arvanites	13,387	100.0
Total votes		13,387	100.0

=== General election ===
==== Endorsements ====
Rodney Frelinghuysen (R)

Organizations

- Humane Society of the United States
- United States Chamber of Commerce
John Arvanites (D)

Labor unions

- AFL-CIO
- National Education Association

Organizations

- National Organization for Women

==== Predictions ====
Source	Ranking	As of
The Cook Political Report	Safe R	November 5, 2012
Rothenberg	Safe R	November 2, 2012
Roll Call	Safe R	November 4, 2012
Sabato's Crystal Ball	Safe R	November 5, 2012
NY Times	Safe R	November 4, 2012
RCP	Safe R	November 4, 2012
The Hill	Safe R	November 4, 2012

==== Results ====
New Jersey's 11th congressional district, 2012
Party	Candidate	Votes	%
Republican	Rodney Frelinghuysen (incumbent)	182,239	58.8
Democratic	John Arvanites	123,935	40.0
Independent	Barry Berlin	3,725	1.2
Total votes		309,899	100.0
Republican hold			

==== By county ====
County	Rodney Frelinghuysen Republican		John Arvanites Democratic		Barry Berlin Independent		Margin		Total votes cast
County	#	%	#	%	#	%	#	%	Total votes cast
Essex (part)	37,475	47.9%	39,834	50.9%	993	1.3%	-2,359	-3.0%	78,302
Morris (part)	101,277	63.9%	55,841	35.3%	1,253	0.8%	45,436	28.6%	158,371
Passaic (part)	28,830	56.2%	21,745	42.4%	765	1.5%	7,085	13.8%	51,340
Sussex (part)	14,655	67.1%	6,477	29.6%	714	3.3%	8,178	37.5%	21,846
Totals	182,237	58.8%	123,897	40.0%	3,725	1.2%	58,340	18.8%	309,859

== District 12 ==
2012 New Jersey's 12th congressional district election
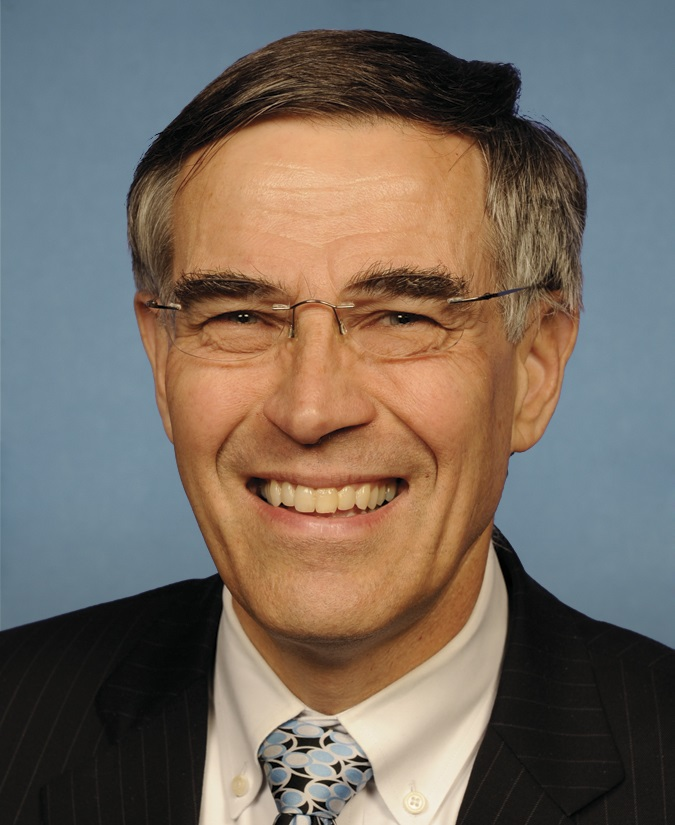

Nominee	Rush Holt	Eric Beck
Party	Democratic	Republican
Popular vote	189,938	80,907
Percentage	69.2%	29.5%
- Holt: 50–60% 60–70% 70–80% >90%

Democrat Rush Holt, who had represented the 12th district since 1999, sought re-election.

Kenneth J. Cody, who ran in this district in 2010, ran again as an independent candidate.

=== Democratic primary ===
==== Candidates ====
===== Nominee =====
- Rush Holt, incumbent U.S. Representative

==== Primary results ====
Democratic primary results
Party	Candidate	Votes	%
Democratic	Rush Holt (incumbent)	24,339	100.0
Total votes		24,339	100.0

=== Republican primary ===
==== Candidates ====
===== Nominee =====
- Eric Beck, businessman and former New Jersey director of the Concord Coalition

===== Declined =====
- Scott Sipprelle, venture capitalist and nominee for this seat in 2010

==== Primary results ====
Republican primary results
Party	Candidate	Votes	%
Republican	Eric A. Beck	9,361	100.0
Total votes		9,361	100.0

=== General election ===
==== Endorsements ====
Rush D. Holt, Jr. (D)

Labor unions

- AFL-CIO
- Fraternal Order of Police
- Health Professionals and Allied Employees
- National Association of Letter Carriers
- National Education Association
- Service Employees International Union

Organizations

- Clean Water Action
- Environment America
- Feminist Majority
- Human Rights Campaign
- Humane Society of the United States
- J Street
- National Organization for Women
- Planned Parenthood Action Fund
- Sierra Club
- Stonewall Democrats

==== Predictions ====
Source	Ranking	As of
The Cook Political Report	Safe D	November 5, 2012
Rothenberg	Safe D	November 2, 2012
Roll Call	Safe D	November 4, 2012
Sabato's Crystal Ball	Safe D	November 5, 2012
NY Times	Safe D	November 4, 2012
RCP	Safe D	November 4, 2012
The Hill	Safe D	November 4, 2012

==== Results ====
New Jersey's 12th congressional district, 2012
Party	Candidate	Votes	%
Democratic	Rush Holt (incumbent)	189,938	69.2
Republican	Eric Beck	80,907	29.5
Independent	Jack Freudenheim	2,261	0.8
Independent	Kenneth J. Cody	1,285	0.5
Total votes		274,391	100.0
Democratic hold			

==== By county ====
County	Rush Holt Democratic		Eric Beck Republican		Various candidates Other parties		Margin		Total votes cast
County	#	%	#	%	#	%	#	%	Total votes cast
Mercer (part)	76,107	76.7%	21,986	22.2%	1,100	1.1%	54,121	44.5%	99,193
Middlesex (part)	71,597	62.0%	42,275	36.6%	1,573	1.4%	29,322	25.4%	115,445
Somerset (part)	22,572	68.9%	9,692	29.6%	514	1.5%	12,880	39.3%	32,778
Union (part)	19,650	72.9%	6,953	25.8%	359	1.4%	12,697	47.1%	26,962
Totals	189,926	69.2%	80,906	29.5%	3,546	1.3%	109,020	39.7%	274,378

== See also ==
- United States House of Representatives elections, 2012
- United States elections, 2012
