= Department of Homeland Security Interoperable Communications Act =

Proposed U.S. law

- Long title: To amend the Homeland Security Act of 2002 to require the Under Secretary for Management of the Department of Homeland Security to take administrative action to achieve and maintain interoperable communications capabilities among the components of the Department of Homeland Security, and for other purposes.
- Announced in: the 113th United States Congress
- Sponsored by: Rep. Donald M. Payne Jr. (D, NJ-10)
- Number of co-sponsors: 1

Codification
- Acts affected: Homeland Security Act of 2002
- U.S.C. sections affected: 6 U.S.C. § 341
- Agencies affected: Department of Homeland Security, Under Secretary of Homeland Security for Management

Legislative history
- Introduced in the House as H.R. 4289 by Rep. Donald M. Payne Jr. (D, NJ-10) on March 24, 2014; Committee consideration by United States House Committee on Homeland Security, United States House Homeland Security Subcommittee on Emergency Preparedness, Response, and Communications; Passed the House on July 8, 2014 (Roll Call Vote 370: 393-0)

The Department of Homeland Security Interoperable Communications Act (H.R. 4289) is a bill that would require the United States Department of Homeland Security (DHS), within 120 days of the bill's enactment, to devise a strategy to improve communications among DHS agencies. DHS would be required to submit regular reports to Congress on their progress and the decisions they make.

The bill was introduced into the United States House of Representatives during the 113th United States Congress.

The bill was substantially reintroduced into the United States House of Representatives during the 114th United States Congress as H.R. 615 and signed by President Barack Obama on July 6, 2015 as Pub. L. 114–29 (text) (PDF).

== Background ==
In this bill, interoperable communications are defined as "utilizing information technology systems and radio communications systems to exchange voice, data, and video in real time, as necessary, for acts of terrorism, daily operations, planned events, and emergencies."

== Provisions of the bill ==
This summary is based largely on the summary provided by the Congressional Research Service, a public domain source.

The Department of Homeland Security Interoperable Communications Act or the DHS Interoperable Communications Act would amend the Homeland Security Act of 2002 to make the Under Secretary for Management of the Department of Homeland Security (DHS) responsible for policies and directives to achieve and maintain interoperable communications among DHS components.

The bill would require the Under Secretary to submit to the House and Senate homeland security committees a strategy for achieving and maintaining such communications, including for daily operations, planned events, and emergencies, that includes:

- an assessment of interoperability gaps in radio communications among the DHS components;
- information on DHS efforts and activities, since November 1, 2012, and planned, to achieve and maintain interoperable communications;
- an assessment of obstacles and challenges to achieving and maintaining interoperable communications;
- information on, and an assessment of, the adequacy of mechanisms available to the Under Secretary to enforce and compel compliance with interoperable communications policies and directives of DHS;
- guidance provided to DHS components to implement such policies and directives;
- the total amount of DHS expenditures, since November 1, 2012, and projected, to achieve interoperable communications; and
- dates upon which DHS-wide interoperability is projected to be achieved for voice, data, and video communications, respectively, and interim milestones.

The bill would direct the Under Secretary to submit with such strategy information on any intra-agency effort or task force that has been delegated responsibilities relating to achieving and maintaining interoperable communications by such dates and on who, within each component, is responsible for implementing policies and directives to achieve and maintain interoperable communications.

The bill would direct the Under Secretary to submit biannual reports on the status of efforts to implement such strategy, including information on any additional resources or authorities needed.

== Congressional Budget Office report ==
This summary is based largely on the summary provided by the Congressional Budget Office, as ordered reported by the House Committee on Homeland Security on June 11, 2014. This is a public domain source.

H.R. 4289 would require the United States Department of Homeland Security (DHS), within 120 days of the bill's enactment, to devise a strategy to improve communications among DHS agencies. Within 220 days of enactment and biannually thereafter, DHS would have to prepare a report on the implementation of that strategy. There are ongoing activities within the department to improve communications, so the Congressional Budget Office (CBO) estimates that implementing the bill would not significantly affect spending by DHS in any year. Enacting the legislation would not affect direct spending or revenues; therefore, pay-as-you-go procedures do not apply.

H.R. 4289 contains no intergovernmental or private-sector mandates as defined in the Unfunded Mandates Reform Act and would impose no costs on state, local, or tribal governments.

== Procedural history ==
The Department of Homeland Security Interoperable Communications Act was introduced into the United States House of Representatives on March 24, 2014 by Rep. Donald M. Payne Jr. (D, NJ-10). The bill was referred to the United States House Committee on Homeland Security and the United States House Homeland Security Subcommittee on Emergency Preparedness, Response, and Communications. On June 19, 2014, the bill was reported alongside House Report 113-484. On July 8, 2014, the House voted in Roll Call Vote 370 to pass the bill 393–0.

== Debate and discussion ==
Rep. Payne, who introduced the bill, said that he "was shocked to learn how much money had been spent on interoperable communications since the September 11th terrorist attacks and still little to show for it." According to Payne's office, the federal government spent over $13 billion since 2001 trying to build interoperable communications, but the Inspector General of DHS reported that "department 'personnel do not have reliable interoperable communications for daily operations, planned events, and emergencies.'" Payne stated that his constituents who were police officers and firefighters "never leave my office without stressing the importance of interoperable communications."

The bill was written in reaction to a 2012 report by the DHS Inspector General that indicated DHS "lacks an effective governance structure to ensure interoperable communications across divisions.

== See also ==
- List of bills in the 113th United States Congress
