= 2012 New Jersey's 10th congressional district special election =

- November 6, 2012

New Jersey's 10th congressional district
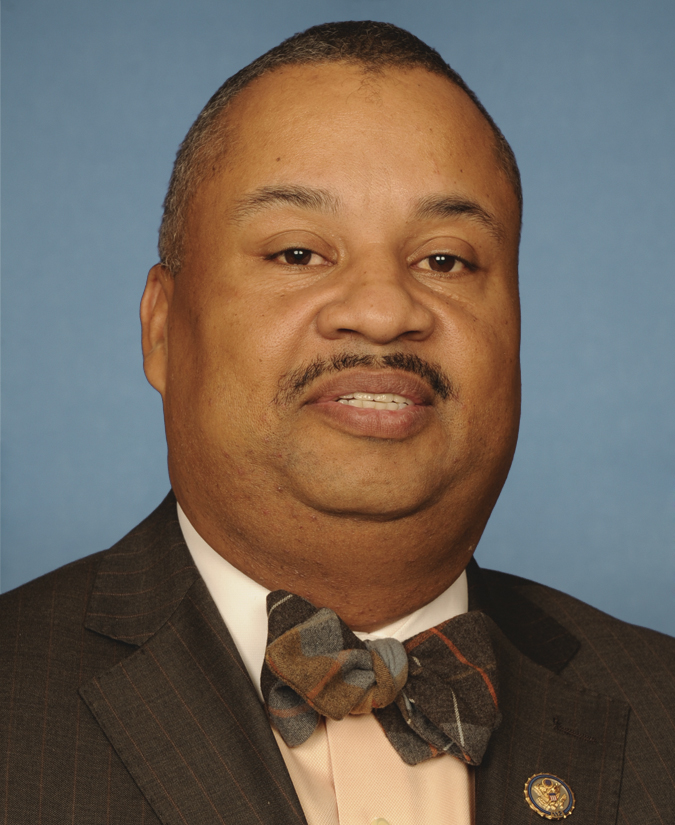
Nominee	Donald Payne Jr.
Party	Democratic
Popular vote	166,413
Percentage	97.4%
Representative before election
Donald M. Payne
Democratic
Elected Representative
Donald Payne Jr.
Democratic

The 2012 special election in New Jersey's 10th congressional district was held on November 6, 2012. Incumbent Democrat Donald M. Payne Sr. died in March 2012. His son Donald Payne Jr. won the June 5, 2012 Democratic special and regular primaries for this seat and the subsequent special and regular general elections, winning all in landslides.

== Schedule ==
As a matter of convenience and cost saving, this special election was held in conjunction with the regularly scheduled general election on November 6, 2012. Voters were asked to select two candidates: one to serve the remainder of Payne's term in the 112th Congress, and the other to serve the full 2-year term in the 113th Congress beginning in January 2013.

== Candidates ==
=== Democratic ===
The following Democratic candidates ran in the special election primary on June 5, 2012:

- Donald Payne Jr., President of the Newark Municipal Council, member of the Essex County Board of Chosen Freeholders, and son of former U.S. Representative Donald M. Payne
- Ronald C. Rice, member of the Newark Municipal Council
- Wayne Smith, Mayor of Irvington

Democratic Special Election Primary results
Party	Candidate	Votes	%
Democratic	Donald Payne Jr.	32,951	70.67
Democratic	Ronald C. Rice	11,503	24.67
Democratic	Wayne Smith	2,175	4.67
Total votes		46,629	100

=== Republican ===
No Republicans declared their intent to run in the special election for the unexpired term. Brian Kelemen ran as the Republican candidate for the full term.

=== Independent ===
- Joanne Miller, a teacher from Newark and candidate for this seat in 2010

== General election ==
=== Results ===
New Jersey's 10th Congressional District special election, 2012
Party	Candidate	Votes	%
Democratic	Donald Payne Jr.	166,413	97.37
Independent	Joanne Miller	4,500	2.63
Majority		161,913	94.73
Democratic hold			

==== By county ====
County	Donald Payne Jr. Democratic		Joanne Miller Other parties		Margin		Total votes cast
County	#	%	#	%	#	%	Total votes cast
Essex (part)	106,683	98.0%	2,204	2.0%	104,479	96.0%	108,887
Hudson (part)	14,713	97.1%	447	2.9%	14,266	94.2%	15,160
Union (part)	45,017	97.1%	1,849	2.9%	43,168	94.2%	46,866
Totals	166,413	97.4%	4,500	2.6%	161,913	94.8%	170,913
