= New Jersey's 10th congressional district =

Urban congressional district in New Jersey

Coordinates: 40.72°N 74.28°W

- Interactive map of district boundaries since January 3, 2023
- Representative: LaMonica McIver; D–Newark
- Distribution: 100% urban; 0.00% rural
- Population (2025): 805,677
- Median household income: $79,957
- Ethnicity: 48.5% Black; 21.4% Hispanic; 18.8% White; 6.3% Asian; 3.5% Two or more races; 1.4% other
- Cook PVI: D+27

New Jersey's 10th congressional district is an congressional district in the U.S. state of New Jersey, encompassing portions of Essex, Hudson and Union counties and cities of Newark and Orange. The district is majority African American and is represented in Congress by Democrat LaMonica McIver, who was elected after the death of Donald Payne, Jr.

== History ==
The 10th congressional district was created starting with the 58th United States Congress in 1903, which used new maps derived from the 1900 census.

It has been based in the city of Newark since 1933, and has been consistently elected Democrats since 1949. With a Cook Partisan Voting Index rating of D+27, it is the most Democratic district in New Jersey.

The district was represented by Donald Payne Jr.'s father, Donald M. Payne Sr., from 1989 to 2012. Following the elder's death in March of that year, Payne Jr. was sworn into office and served from January 3, 2013 until his death on April 24, 2024. LaMonica McIver was elected as his successor in September of that year.

== Counties and municipalities in the district ==
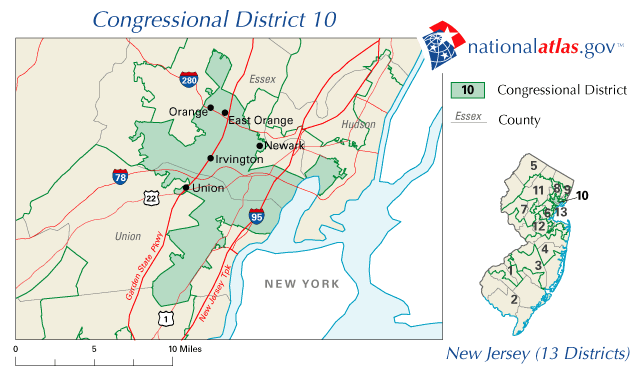
The district from 2003 to 2013

For the 118th and successive Congresses (based on redistricting following the 2020 census), the district contains all or portions of three counties and 18 municipalities.

Essex County: (9)

Caldwell, East Orange, Essex Fells, Irvington, Montclair (part; also 11th), Newark (part; also 8th), Orange, Verona, West Orange

Hudson County: (1)

Jersey City (part; also 8th)

Union County: (8)

Cranford, Garwood, Hillside, Kenilworth, Linden (part; also 7th), Roselle, Roselle Park, Union

== Recent election results from statewide races ==
Year	Office	Results
2008	President	Obama 81% - 18%
2012	President	Obama 85% - 15%
2016	President	Clinton 82% - 16%
2017	Governor	Murphy 83% - 16%
2018	Senate	Menendez 81% - 17%
2020	President	Biden 81% - 18%
2020	Senate	Booker 82% - 17%
2021	Governor	Murphy 78% - 21%
2024	President	Harris 75% - 24%
2024	Senate	Kim 75% - 22%
2025	Governor	Sherrill 81% - 18%

== Recent election results ==
=== 1988 ===
1988 election
Party	Candidate	Votes	%
Democratic	Donald M. Payne, Newark	84,681	77.35%
Republican	Michael Webb, East Orange	13,848	12.65%
Independent	Anthony Imperiale, Newark	5,422	4.95%
Socialist Workers	Mindy Birdno, Newark	4,539	4.15%
Independent	Alvin Curtis, Jersey City	551	0.50%
Independent	Alan Bowser, East Orange	432	0.40%
Majority		70,833	64.70%
Turnout		109,473	100%

=== 1990 ===
1990 election
Party	Candidate	Votes	%
Democratic	Donald M. Payne (incumbent)	42,106	81.44%
Republican	Howard E. Berkeley	8,954	17.32%
Socialist Workers	George Mehrabian	643	1.24%
Majority		33,152	64.12%
Turnout		51,703	100%

=== 1992 ===
1992 election
Party	Candidate	Votes	%
Democratic	Donald M. Payne (incumbent)	117,287	78.38%
Republican	Alfred D. Palermo	30,160	20.16%
Libertarian	Roberto Caraballo	1,272	0.85%
Socialist Workers	William Theodore Leonard	913	0.61%
Majority		87,127	58.23%
Turnout		149,632	100%

=== 1994 ===
1994 election
Party	Candidate	Votes	%
Democratic	Donald M. Payne (incumbent)	74,622	75.86%
Republican	Jim Ford	21,524	21.88%
Independent	Rose Monyek	1,598	1.63%
Socialist Workers	Maurice Williams	624	0.63%
Majority		53,098	53.98%
Turnout		98,368	100%

=== 1996 ===
1996 election
Party	Candidate	Votes	%
Democratic	Donald M. Payne (incumbent)	127,126	84.2
Republican	Vanessa Williams	22,086	14.6
Independent	Harley Tyler	1,192	0.8
Independent	Toni M. Jackson	656	0.4
Turnout		151,060	100%

=== 1998 ===
1998 election
Party	Candidate	Votes	%
Democratic	Donald M. Payne (incumbent)	82,244	83.5
Republican	William Stanley Wnuck	10,678	10.8
Independent	Richard J. Pezzullo	3,293	3.3
Independent	Maurice Williams	2,279	2.3
Turnout		98,494	100%

=== 2000 ===
2000 election
Party	Candidate	Votes	%
Democratic	Donald M. Payne (incumbent)	133,073	87.5
Republican	Dirk B. Weber	18,436	12.1
Independent	Maurice Williams	536	0.4
Turnout		152,045	100%

=== 2002 ===
2002 election
Party	Candidate	Votes	%
Democratic	Donald M. Payne (incumbent)	86,433	84.5
Republican	Andrew Wirtz	15,913	15.5
Turnout		102,346	100%

=== 2004 ===
2004 election
Party	Candidate	Votes	%
Democratic	Donald M. Payne (incumbent)	155,697	96.88%
Green	Toy-Ling Washington	2,927	1.30%
Independent	Sara Lobman	2,089	1.82%
Majority		152,770	95.06%
Turnout		160,713	
Democratic hold			

=== 2006 ===
New Jersey's 10th congressional district election, 2006
Party	Candidate	Votes	%
Democratic	Donald Payne (incumbent)	90,264	100

=== 2008 ===
New Jersey's 10th congressional district election, 2008
Party	Candidate	Votes	%
Democratic	Donald M. Payne (incumbent)	169,945	98.92
Socialist Workers Party	Michael Taber	1,848	1.08

=== 2010 ===
2010 election
Party	Candidate	Votes	%
Democratic	Donald M. Payne (incumbent)	95,299	85.2
Republican	Michael J. Alonso	14,357	12.8
Independent	Robert Louis Toussaint	1,141	1
Independent	Joanne Miller	1,080	1
Turnout		111,877	100%

=== 2012 ===
New Jersey's 10th congressional district, 2012
Party	Candidate	Votes	%
Democratic	Donald Payne Jr.	201,435	87.6
Republican	Brian Kelemen	24,271	10.5
Independent	Joanne Miller	3,127	1.4
Libertarian	Mick Erickson	1,227	0.5
Total votes		230,060	100
Democratic hold			

=== 2014 ===
New Jersey's 10th congressional district, 2014
Party	Candidate	Votes	%
Democratic	Donald Payne Jr. (incumbent)	95,734	85.4
Republican	Yolanda Dentley	14,154	12.6
Independent	Gwendolyn A. Franklin	1,237	1.1
Independent	Dark Angel	998	0.9
Total votes		112,123	100
Democratic hold			

=== 2016 ===
New Jersey's 10th congressional district, 2016
Party	Candidate	Votes	%
Democratic	Donald Payne Jr. (incumbent)	190,856	85.7
Republican	David H. Pinckney	26,450	11.8
Independent	Joanne Miller	3,719	1.7
Independent	Aaron Walter Fraser	1,746	0.8
Total votes		222,771	100
Democratic hold			

=== 2018 ===
New Jersey's 10th congressional district, 2018
Party	Candidate	Votes	%
Democratic	Donald M. Payne Jr. (incumbent)	175,253	87.6
Republican	Agha Khan	20,191	10.1
Independent	Cynthia Johnson	2,070	1.0
Independent	Joanne Miller	2,038	1.0
Libertarian	Scott DiRoma	607	0.3
Total votes		200,159	100

=== 2020 ===
New Jersey's 10th congressional district, 2020
Party	Candidate	Votes	%
Democratic	Donald Payne Jr. (incumbent)	241,522	83.3
Republican	Jennifer Zinone	40,298	13.9
Independent	Akil Khalfani	3,537	1.2
Independent	Liah Fitchette	3,480	1.2
Libertarian	John Mirrione	1,172	0.4
Total votes		290,009	100
Democratic hold			

=== 2022 ===
New Jersey's 10th congressional district, 2022
Party	Candidate	Votes	%
Democratic	Donald Payne Jr. (incumbent)	99,613	77.6
Republican	David Pinckney	25,792	20.1
Independent	Cynthia Johnson	1,955	1.5
Libertarian	Kendal Ludden	624	0.5
Independent	Clenard J. Childress Jr.	378	0.3
Total votes		128,362	100
Democratic hold			

=== 2024 ===
2024 New Jersey's 10th congressional district special election
Party	Candidate	Votes	%	±%
Democratic	LaMonica McIver	26,269	81.17%	+3.53%
Republican	Carmen Bucco	5,126	15.84%	−6.20%
One For All... (Note: Not an actual political party. In New Jersey, independent candidates are allowed to choose a ballot label)	Russell Jenkins	515	1.59%	N/A
Creating Real Progress	Rayfield Morton	454	1.40%	N/A
Total votes		32,364	100.00%	
Democratic hold				

== List of members representing the district ==
Member	Party	Years	Cong ress	Electoral history	Counties/Towns
District established March 4, 1903
Allan Langdon McDermott (Jersey City)	Democratic	March 4, 1903 – March 3, 1907	58th 59th	Redistricted from the 7th district and re-elected in 1902. Re-elected in 1904. Retired.	1903–1913 part of Jersey City
James A. Hamill (Jersey City)	Democratic	March 4, 1907 – March 3, 1913	60th 61st 62nd	Elected in 1906. Re-elected in 1908. Re-elected in 1910. Redistricted to the 12th district.	1903–1913 part of Jersey City
Edward W. Townsend (Montclair)	Democratic	March 4, 1913 – March 3, 1915	63rd	Redistricted from the 7th district and re-elected in 1912. Lost re-election.	1913–1933 parts of Essex (excluding Belleville, Bloomfield, East Orange, Glen Ridge, Nutley, Orange, and parts of Newark)
Frederick R. Lehlbach (Newark)	Republican	March 4, 1915 – March 3, 1933	64th 65th 66th 67th 68th 69th 70th 71st 72nd	Elected in 1914. Re-elected in 1916. Re-elected in 1918. Re-elected in 1920. Re-elected in 1922. Re-elected in 1924. Re-elected in 1926. Re-elected in 1928. Re-elected in 1930. Redistricted to the 12th district.	1913–1933 parts of Essex (excluding Belleville, Bloomfield, East Orange, Glen Ridge, Nutley, Orange, and parts of Newark)
Fred A. Hartley Jr. (Pittstown)	Republican	March 4, 1933 – January 3, 1949	73rd 74th 75th 76th 77th 78th 79th 80th	Redistricted from the 8th district and re-elected in 1932. Re-elected in 1934. Re-elected in 1936. Re-elected in 1938. Re-elected in 1940. Re-elected in 1942. Re-elected in 1944. Re-elected in 1946. Retired.	1933–1967 parts of Essex (Belleville, Bloomfield, Glen Ridge, Nutley and parts of Newark) and Hudson (East Newark, Harrison, Kearney)
Peter W. Rodino (Newark)	Democratic	January 3, 1949 – January 3, 1989	81st 82nd 83rd 84th 85th 86th 87th 88th 89th 90th 91st 92nd 93rd 94th 95th 96th 97th 98th 99th 100th	Elected in 1948. Re-elected in 1950. Re-elected in 1952. Re-elected in 1954. Re-elected in 1956. Re-elected in 1958. Re-elected in 1960. Re-elected in 1962. Re-elected in 1964. Re-elected in 1966. Re-elected in 1968. Re-elected in 1970. Re-elected in 1972. Re-elected in 1974. Re-elected in 1976. Re-elected in 1978. Re-elected in 1980. Re-elected in 1982. Re-elected in 1984. Re-elected in 1986. Retired.	1933–1967 parts of Essex (Belleville, Bloomfield, Glen Ridge, Nutley and parts of Newark) and Hudson (East Newark, Harrison, Kearney)
Peter W. Rodino (Newark)	Democratic	January 3, 1949 – January 3, 1989	81st 82nd 83rd 84th 85th 86th 87th 88th 89th 90th 91st 92nd 93rd 94th 95th 96th 97th 98th 99th 100th	Elected in 1948. Re-elected in 1950. Re-elected in 1952. Re-elected in 1954. Re-elected in 1956. Re-elected in 1958. Re-elected in 1960. Re-elected in 1962. Re-elected in 1964. Re-elected in 1966. Re-elected in 1968. Re-elected in 1970. Re-elected in 1972. Re-elected in 1974. Re-elected in 1976. Re-elected in 1978. Re-elected in 1980. Re-elected in 1982. Re-elected in 1984. Re-elected in 1986. Retired.	1967–1973 parts of Essex (Belleville, Bloomfield, Cedar Grove, Glen Ridge, Montclair, Nutley and parts of Newark)
Peter W. Rodino (Newark)	Democratic	January 3, 1949 – January 3, 1989	81st 82nd 83rd 84th 85th 86th 87th 88th 89th 90th 91st 92nd 93rd 94th 95th 96th 97th 98th 99th 100th	Elected in 1948. Re-elected in 1950. Re-elected in 1952. Re-elected in 1954. Re-elected in 1956. Re-elected in 1958. Re-elected in 1960. Re-elected in 1962. Re-elected in 1964. Re-elected in 1966. Re-elected in 1968. Re-elected in 1970. Re-elected in 1972. Re-elected in 1974. Re-elected in 1976. Re-elected in 1978. Re-elected in 1980. Re-elected in 1982. Re-elected in 1984. Re-elected in 1986. Retired.	1973–1983 parts of Essex (East Orange, Glen Ridge, Newark)
Peter W. Rodino (Newark)	Democratic	January 3, 1949 – January 3, 1989	81st 82nd 83rd 84th 85th 86th 87th 88th 89th 90th 91st 92nd 93rd 94th 95th 96th 97th 98th 99th 100th	Elected in 1948. Re-elected in 1950. Re-elected in 1952. Re-elected in 1954. Re-elected in 1956. Re-elected in 1958. Re-elected in 1960. Re-elected in 1962. Re-elected in 1964. Re-elected in 1966. Re-elected in 1968. Re-elected in 1970. Re-elected in 1972. Re-elected in 1974. Re-elected in 1976. Re-elected in 1978. Re-elected in 1980. Re-elected in 1982. Re-elected in 1984. Re-elected in 1986. Retired.	1983–1985 parts of Essex (East Orange, Irvington, Newark, and Orange) and Union (Hillside)
Peter W. Rodino (Newark)	Democratic	January 3, 1949 – January 3, 1989	81st 82nd 83rd 84th 85th 86th 87th 88th 89th 90th 91st 92nd 93rd 94th 95th 96th 97th 98th 99th 100th	Elected in 1948. Re-elected in 1950. Re-elected in 1952. Re-elected in 1954. Re-elected in 1956. Re-elected in 1958. Re-elected in 1960. Re-elected in 1962. Re-elected in 1964. Re-elected in 1966. Re-elected in 1968. Re-elected in 1970. Re-elected in 1972. Re-elected in 1974. Re-elected in 1976. Re-elected in 1978. Re-elected in 1980. Re-elected in 1982. Re-elected in 1984. Re-elected in 1986. Retired.	1985–1993 parts of Essex (East Orange, Glen Ridge, Irvington, Newark, and South Orange) and Union (Hillside)
Donald M. Payne (Newark)	Democratic	January 3, 1989 – March 6, 2012	101st 102nd 103rd 104th 105th 106th 107th 108th 109th 110th 111th 112th	Elected in 1988. Re-elected in 1990. Re-elected in 1992. Re-elected in 1994. Re-elected in 1996. Re-elected in 1998. Re-elected in 2000. Re-elected in 2002. Re-elected in 2004. Re-elected in 2006. Re-elected in 2008. Re-elected in 2010. Died.	1985–1993 parts of Essex (East Orange, Glen Ridge, Irvington, Newark, and South Orange) and Union (Hillside)
Donald M. Payne (Newark)	Democratic	January 3, 1989 – March 6, 2012	101st 102nd 103rd 104th 105th 106th 107th 108th 109th 110th 111th 112th	Elected in 1988. Re-elected in 1990. Re-elected in 1992. Re-elected in 1994. Re-elected in 1996. Re-elected in 1998. Re-elected in 2000. Re-elected in 2002. Re-elected in 2004. Re-elected in 2006. Re-elected in 2008. Re-elected in 2010. Died.	1993–2003 parts of Essex, Hudson, and Union
Donald M. Payne (Newark)	Democratic	January 3, 1989 – March 6, 2012	101st 102nd 103rd 104th 105th 106th 107th 108th 109th 110th 111th 112th	Elected in 1988. Re-elected in 1990. Re-elected in 1992. Re-elected in 1994. Re-elected in 1996. Re-elected in 1998. Re-elected in 2000. Re-elected in 2002. Re-elected in 2004. Re-elected in 2006. Re-elected in 2008. Re-elected in 2010. Died.	2003–2013 parts of Essex, Hudson, and Union
Vacant		March 6, 2012 – November 13, 2012	112th		2003–2013 parts of Essex, Hudson, and Union
Donald Payne Jr. (Newark)	Democratic	November 13, 2012 – April 24, 2024	112th 113th 114th 115th 116th 117th 118th	Elected to finish his father's term. Elected to full term in 2012. Re-elected in 2014. Re-elected in 2016. Re-elected in 2018. Re-elected in 2020. Re-elected in 2022. Died and renominated posthumously on ballot.	2003–2013 parts of Essex, Hudson, and Union
Donald Payne Jr. (Newark)	Democratic	November 13, 2012 – April 24, 2024	112th 113th 114th 115th 116th 117th 118th	Elected to finish his father's term. Elected to full term in 2012. Re-elected in 2014. Re-elected in 2016. Re-elected in 2018. Re-elected in 2020. Re-elected in 2022. Died and renominated posthumously on ballot.	2013–2023 parts of Essex, Hudson, and Union (Hillside, Linden, Rahway, Roselle, Roselle Park and parts of Union Township)
Donald Payne Jr. (Newark)	Democratic	November 13, 2012 – April 24, 2024	112th 113th 114th 115th 116th 117th 118th	Elected to finish his father's term. Elected to full term in 2012. Re-elected in 2014. Re-elected in 2016. Re-elected in 2018. Re-elected in 2020. Re-elected in 2022. Died and renominated posthumously on ballot.	2023–present parts of Essex, Hudson, and Union (Cranford, Hillside, Rahway, Roselle, Roselle Park, Union Township, and parts of Linden)
Vacant		April 24, 2024 – September 23, 2024	118th		2023–present parts of Essex, Hudson, and Union (Cranford, Hillside, Rahway, Roselle, Roselle Park, Union Township, and parts of Linden)
LaMonica McIver (Newark)	Democratic	September 23, 2024 – present	118th 119th	Elected to finish Payne's term. Re-elected later in 2024. Re-elected in 2026.	2023–present parts of Essex, Hudson, and Union (Cranford, Hillside, Rahway, Roselle, Roselle Park, Union Township, and parts of Linden)
