= Donald Payne Jr. =

American politician (1958–2024)

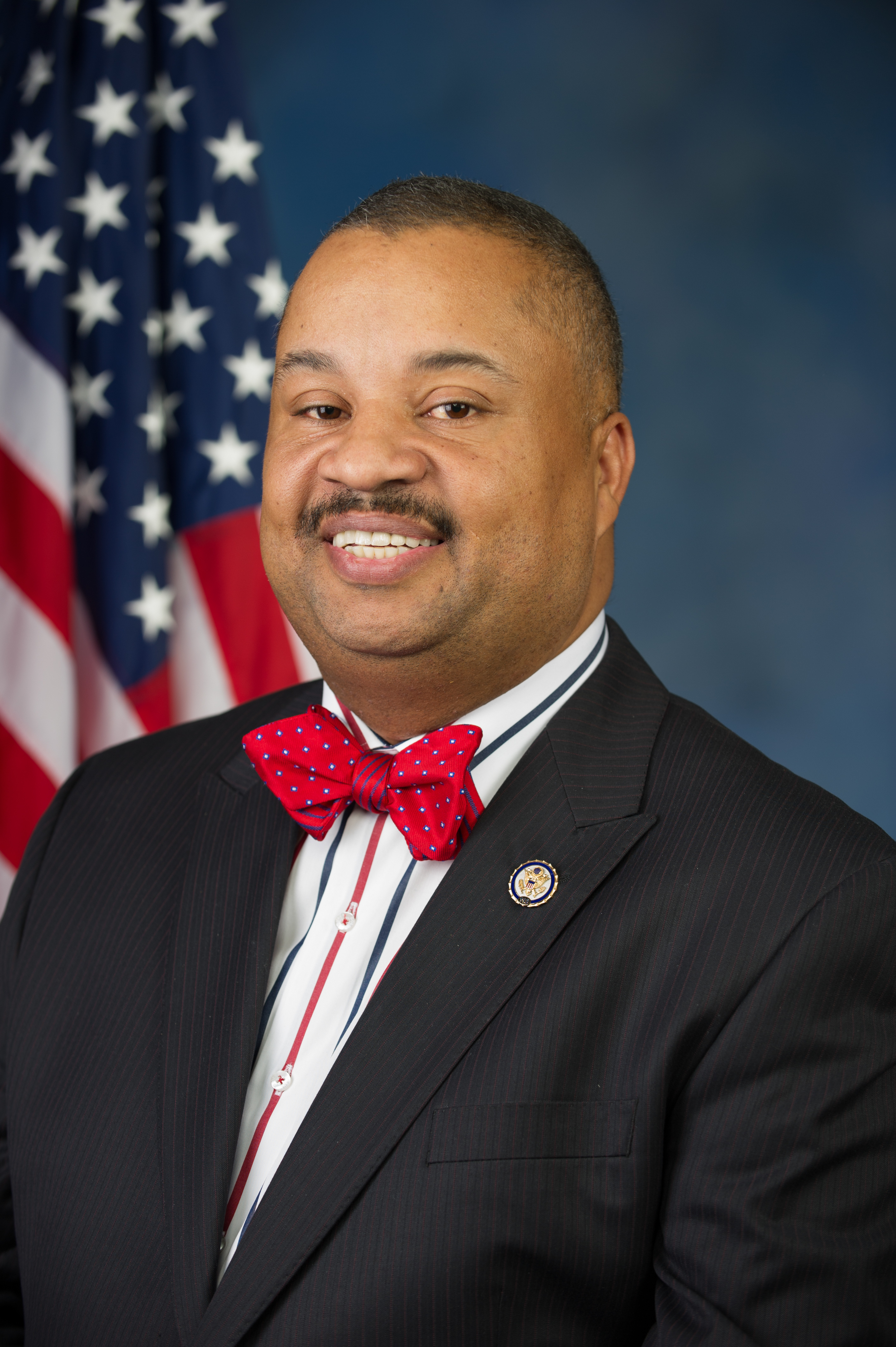
- Official portrait, 2012

Member of the U.S. House of Representatives from New Jersey's 10th district
- In office November 6, 2012 – April 24, 2024 (Note: Payne's official service begins on the date of the special election, while he was not sworn in until November 15, 2012.)
- Preceded by: Donald M. Payne
- Succeeded by: LaMonica McIver

Personal details
- Born: Donald Milford Payne Jr. December 17, 1958 Newark, New Jersey, U.S.
- Died: April 24, 2024 (aged 65) Newark, New Jersey, U.S.
- Party: Democratic
- Spouse: Beatrice Payne
- Children: 3
- Relatives: Donald M. Payne (father); William D. Payne (uncle); Craig A. Stanley (cousin)
- Education: Kean University
- Payne's voice Payne supporting the School and Daycare Protection Act. Recorded April 5, 2022

Donald Milford Payne Jr. (December 17, 1958 – April 24, 2024) was an American politician who served as the U.S. representative for New Jersey's 10th congressional district from 2012 until his death in 2024. A member of the Democratic Party, Payne served as president of the Newark city council from 2010 to 2012.

Following the death of his father, U.S. Representative Donald M. Payne, on March 6, 2012, Payne ran in the primary to succeed him in Congress. His father was first elected in 1988 and re-elected 11 times without significant opposition. Payne Jr. won the June 5, 2012, Democratic primary election, which is tantamount to election in the heavily Democratic district, and the November 6, 2012, general election. Payne Jr. was re-elected five times prior to his death in office in 2024.

== Early life, education, and early career ==
Payne was born on December 17, 1958, in Newark, New Jersey, where he was also raised alongside his two sisters, Wanda and Nicole. He was a 1976 graduate of Hillside High School. His father, Donald M. Payne, served in the United States House of Representatives from 1989 until his death in 2012, and was the first African American to represent the state of New Jersey in Congress. His mother, Hazel Payne (née Johnson), died in 1963, when Payne was five years old.

As a teenager, he founded and was the first president of the Newark South Ward Junior Democrats. He studied graphic arts at Kean University. He was an adviser at the YMCA Youth in Government program.

Payne worked for the New Jersey Highway Authority from 1991 until he joined the Essex County Educational Services Commission in 1996, where he worked as the supervisor of student transportation.

== Newark Municipal Council ==
In 2010, Payne was reelected to the Municipal Council of Newark with 19% of the vote. Other candidates elected were Mildred C. Crump, Luis Quintana, and Carlos Gonzales.

As a city councilman, Payne supported Planned Parenthood, stem-cell research, Medicaid, and education funding.

In July 2010, Payne was elected president of the Newark City Council, succeeding Crump.

Payne's committee assignments included health, education, and recreation.

== Essex County Board of Freeholders ==
In 2005, Payne was one of four candidates elected to the at-large seat, serving from January 1, 2006, to November 6, 2012. He finished first with 19% of the vote. In 2008, he was reelected to a second term with 20% of the vote. In 2011, he was reelected to a third term with 18% of the vote.

== U.S. House of Representatives ==
=== 2012 special election ===
After his father's death, Payne declared his intention to run in the special election to fill the remainder of his father's 12th term, and the regularly scheduled election for the full two-year term beginning in January 2013. The primaries for both elections were held on June 5, and the general elections on November 6.

According to documents filed on May 24 with the Federal Election Commission, Payne both raised and spent more money than any other Democratic candidate. House Minority Leader Nancy Pelosi endorsed Payne on May 22.

In the Democratic primary for the special election, Payne faced Ronald C. Rice (son of State Senator Ronald Rice) and Irvington Mayor Wayne Smith. He won the primary with 71% of the vote to Rice's 25% and Smith's 5%.

In the Democratic primary for the full term, Payne faced Rice, Smith, State Senator Nia Gill, Cathy Wright of Newark, and Dennis R. Flynn of Glen Ridge. He won with 60% of the vote, to Rice's 19%, Gill's 17%. Smith, Wright, and Flynn combined for about 5% of the vote.

After the election, Payne noted, "I've said that I'm following a legacy and I'm not backing away from that."

=== 2012 ===
In the November 6 general election, Payne defeated Republican nominee Brian C. Kelemen with 87% of the vote. He ran unopposed for the special election to fill the remainder of his father's term. The 10th is a heavily Democratic, black-majority district, and Payne had effectively assured himself election with his primary victory. He is only the fourth person to represent this district since 1929.

=== 2014 ===
Payne faced three minor opponents in the Democratic primary, but was handily renominated with over 91% of the vote. Payne faced Republican Yolanda Dentley and two independents in the general election, and was re-elected with 85.4% of the vote.

=== 2016 ===
Payne was unopposed in the Democratic primary in 2016. He faced Republican David Pinckney and two independents in the general election, and won with 85.7% of the vote.

=== 2018 ===
Payne easily dispatched his only challenger in the primary, Aaron Walter Fraser, with a margin of 91.7%–8.3%. Payne would defeat Republican Agha Khan, Libertarian Scott DiRoma, and two independents in the general election, receiving 86.7% of the vote.

=== 2020 ===
Payne faced two challengers in the 2020 Democratic primary, but won renomination with 88.5% of the vote. Then in the general election he defeated Republican Jennifer Zinone, Libertarian John Mirrione, and two independents, receiving 83.3% of the vote.

=== 2022 ===
Payne faced two challengers, Imani Oakley and Akil Khafani. He defeated both of them, receiving 83.3% of the vote. Then in the general election he faced Republican David Pinckney, Libertarian Kendal Ludden, and two independents. He would be re-elected with 77.6% of the vote.

=== Tenure ===
Payne was sworn into office on November 15, 2012. He thus had two months more seniority than other members of the 2012 House freshman class. He co-sponsored the Violence Against Women Reauthorization Act of 2013 and the Paycheck Fairness Act, a bill aimed at expanding the scope of the Equal Pay Act of 1963 and Fair Labor Standards Act. Payne also co-sponsored H.R. 41, authorizing $30.4 billion from the Federal Emergency Management Agency's National Flood Insurance Program to victims of Hurricane Sandy.

On March 24, 2014, Payne introduced the Department of Homeland Security Interoperable Communications Act (H.R. 4289; 113th Congress) a bill that would require the United States Department of Homeland Security (DHS), within 120 days of the bill's enactment, to devise a strategy to improve communications among DHS agencies. DHS would be required to submit regular reports to Congress on its progress and the decisions it makes.

Payne voted with President Joe Biden's stated position 100% of the time in the 117th Congress, according to a FiveThirtyEight analysis.

=== Committee assignments ===
- Committee on Homeland Security
  - Subcommittee on Emergency Management and Technology
  - Subcommittee on Transportation and Maritime Security
- Committee on Transportation and Infrastructure
  - Subcommittee on Aviation
  - Subcommittee on Railroads, Pipelines and Hazardous Materials

=== Caucus memberships ===
- Congressional Black Caucus
- Congressional Caucus on Sudan and South Sudan
- Congressional Small Business Caucus
- Ports, Opportunity, Renewable, Trade, and Security (PORTS) Caucus
- Congressional Arts Caucus
- United States Congressional International Conservation Caucus
- Blue Collar Caucus
- Congressional Taiwan Caucus

== Personal life and death ==
Payne lived in Newark with his wife, Beatrice. They were the parents of triplets.

On April 6, 2024, Payne was hospitalized at Newark Beth Israel Medical Center following a heart attack that his office said was a complication of diabetes. He remained unconscious and on a ventilator until his death on April 24, at the age of 65. He would posthumously win the New Jersey Primary on June 4, 2024, in which he was the only candidate on the ballot.

== Electoral history ==
New Jersey's 10th congressional district: Results 2012–2022
Year	Democratic	Votes	Pct	Republican	Votes	Pct	3rd Party	Party	Votes	Pct	3rd Party	Party	Votes	Pct
2012 (special)	Donald Payne Jr.	166,413	97.4%				Joanne Miller	Independent	4,500	2.6%				
2012	Donald Payne Jr.	201,435	87.6%	Brian Kelemen	24,271	10.5%	Joanne Miller	Independent	3,127	1.4%	Robert Shapiro	Libertarian	1,227	0.5%
2014	Donald Payne Jr.	95,734	85.4%	Yolanda Dentley	14,154	12.6%	Gwendolyn A. Franklin	Independent	1,237	1.1%	Dark Angel	Independent	998	0.9%
2016	Donald Payne Jr.	190,856	85.7%	David H. Pinckney	26,450	11.8%	Joanne Miller	Independent	3,719	1.7%	Aaron Walter Fraser	Independent	1,746	0.8%
2018	Donald Payne Jr.	175,253	87.6%	Agha Khan	20,191	10.1%	Cynthia Johnson	Independent	2,070	1.0%	Joanne Miller	Independent	2,038	1.0%
2020	Donald Payne Jr.	241,522	83.3%	Jennifer Zinone	40,298	13.9%	Akil Khalfani	Independent	3,537	1.2%	Liah Fitchette	Independent	3,480	1.2%
2022	Donald Payne Jr.	99,613	77.6%	David Pinckney	25,792	20.1%	Cynthia Johnson	Independent	1,955	1.5%	Kendal Ludden	Libertarian	624	0.5%

* In 2018, Libertarian candidate Scott DiRoma garnered 0.3% of the vote. In 2020, Libertarian candidate John Mirrione garnered 0.4%. In 2022, Independent candidate Clenard J. Childress, Jr. garnered 0.3%.

== See also ==
- List of African-American United States representatives
- List of members of the United States Congress who died in office (2000–present)
- Final Report of the Task Force on Combating Terrorist and Foreign Fighter Travel

U.S. House of Representatives
Preceded by Donald M. Payne	Member of the U.S. House of Representatives from New Jersey's 10th congressional district 2012–2024	Succeeded by LaMonica McIver
