= Ronald C. Rice =

American politician (born 1968)

Member of the Newark Municipal Council (West Ward Councilman)
- In office July 1, 2006 – July 1, 2014
- Succeeded by: Joe McCallum

Personal details
- Born: February 17, 1968 (age 58)
- Party: Democratic
- Education: B.A. American University (Political Science and Public Administration); JD Seton Hall University School of Law
- Occupation: Attorney and Politician

Ronald C. Rice (born February 17, 1968) is an American Democratic Party politician, who served on the Newark Municipal Council from 2006 to 2014. He represented the West Ward, comprising the neighborhoods of Vailsburg, Ivy Hill, West Side, Fairmount and Roseville. Rice chose not to run for re-election in the 2014 municipal election.

== Background ==
Rice was born and raised in Newark; he is the son of Ronald L. Rice. in 1986, he graduated from the Pingry School. He received his BA at American University and his JD from Seton Hall University School of Law .

== Council Member ==
Rice first ran for Municipal Council in 2002, and election documented in the film Street Fight. In 2006, Ron won the race for West Ward Councilman and was sworn into office with newly elected Mayor Cory A. Booker on July 1, 2006.

== 2012 congressional bid ==
Councilman Rice announced on March 15, 2012 that he would run as a candidate in the June 5, 2012 primary election to fill the seat in Congress left vacant by the death of Donald M. Payne, the former U.S. Representative for New Jersey's 10th congressional district. The Democratic primary victor was heavily favored to win the special election, which would allow the winner to represent the current 10th Congressional District from November 6, 2012 – January 3, 2013; as well as the general election, whose winner will serve the new 10th Congressional District for the two-year term from January 3, 2013 – January 3, 2015.

Also competing for that nomination were Dennis R. Flynn of Glen Ridge, state Senator Nia Gill, Newark Councilman Donald Payne Jr. (son of the congressman), Irvington Mayor Wayne Smith, and Cathy Wright of Newark. Payne won in a landslide, garnering 60 percent of the vote. Rice received 19 percent, Gill 17 percent, and Smith, Flynn and Wright combined for about 5 percent of the vote.

== See also ==
- Mayors of Newark, New Jersey
- Brick City (TV series)
