= United States House Homeland Security Subcommittee on Emergency Management and Technology =

US House committee

Subcommittee of Committee on Homeland Security
- Active United States House of Representatives; 119th Congress

Leadership
- Chair: Dale Strong (R)
- Ranking Member: Timothy M. Kennedy (D)

Structure
- Seats: 7 (7 currently filled) 4/4 3/3
- Political parties: Majority (4): Republican (4); Minority (3): Democratic (3)

Meeting place
- 176, Ford House Office Building; Washington, D.C. 20515

Phone number
- (202)-226-8417

The Homeland Security Subcommittee on Emergency Management and Technology is a subcommittee within the House Homeland Security Committee. Established in 2007 as a new subcommittee, it handles many of the duties of the former Subcommittee on Emergency Preparedness, Science, and Technology. The Subcommittee focuses on: emergency preparedness, response, mitigation, resilience, and recovery; DHS grant programs; homeland security research and development; and protecting against and mitigating Weapon of mass destruction(WMDs) and health security threats. Subcommittee maintains oversight of the Federal Emergency Management Agency (FEMA), DHS Science and Technology Directorate (S&T), the Office of Countering Weapons of Mass Destruction (CWMD) (Note: The Domestic Nuclear Detection Office (DNDO) is a jointly staffed office within the Department of Homeland Security (DHS) Countering Weapons of Mass Destruction Office, and the Office of Health Security (OHS).) Between 2019 and 2023, it was known as the Homeland Security Subcommittee on Emergency Preparedness, Response and Recovery.

== Members, 119th Congress ==
Majority	Minority
Dale Strong, Alabama, Chair; Josh Brecheen, Oklahoma; Gabe Evans, Colorado; Ryan Mackenzie, Pennsylvania	Tim Kennedy, New York, Ranking Member; Julie Johnson, Texas; Pablo Hernández Rivera, Puerto Rico
Ex officio
Mark Green, Tennessee	Bennie Thompson, Mississippi

== Historical membership rosters ==
=== 118th Congress ===
Majority	Minority
Anthony D'Esposito, New York, Chair; Nick LaLota, New York; Dale Strong, Alabama; Josh Brecheen, Oklahoma	Troy Carter, Louisiana, Ranking Member; Donald Payne Jr., New Jersey (until April 24, 2024); Dan Goldman, New York
Ex officio
Mark Green, Tennessee	Bennie Thompson, Mississippi

=== 117th Congress ===
Majority	Minority
Val Demings, Florida, Chair; Sheila Jackson Lee, Texas; Donald Payne Jr., New Jersey; Al Green, Texas; Bonnie Watson Coleman, New Jersey	Kat Cammack, Florida, Ranking Member; Clay Higgins, Louisiana; Mariannette Miller-Meeks, Iowa; Andrew Garbarino, New York
Ex officio
Bennie Thompson, Mississippi	John Katko, New York

=== 116th Congress ===
Majority	Minority
Donald Payne Jr., New Jersey, Chair; Cedric Richmond, Louisiana; Max Rose, New York; Lauren Underwood, Illinois; Al Green, Texas; Yvette Clarke, New York	Peter T. King, New York, Ranking Member; John Joyce, Pennsylvania; Dan Crenshaw, Texas; Michael Guest, Mississippi; Dan Bishop, North Carolina
Ex officio
Bennie Thompson, Mississippi	Mike Rogers, Alabama

=== 115th Congress ===
Majority	Minority
Dan Donovan, New York, Chairman; Tom Marino, Pennsylvania; Martha McSally, Arizona; John Rutherford, Florida; Tom Garrett Jr., Virginia	Donald Payne, Jr., New Jersey, Ranking Member; James Langevin, Rhode Island; Bonnie Watson Coleman, New Jersey
Ex officio
Michael McCaul, Texas	Bennie Thompson, Mississippi
