= Health Professionals and Allied Employees =

American health care labor union

HPAE
- Health Professionals and Allied Employees
- Founded: 1975
- Headquarters: Emerson, New Jersey
- Location: United States
- Members: 13,000
- Key people: Ann Twomey, president
- Affiliations: AFT, AFL–CIO
- Website: www.hpae.org

The Health Professionals and Allied Employees (HPAE) is a health care labor union in New Jersey and Pennsylvania that represents registered nurses and other health care workers in hospitals, nursing homes, blood banks and clinics in the public and private sector. It is an affiliate of the American Federation of Teachers (AFT) and the AFL–CIO.

== Formation and early history ==
HPAE's precursor union, the Englewood Hospital Nurses Association, was formed in 1974 when Ann Twomey, a registered nurse, organized an independent nurses union at Englewood Hospital in Englewood, New Jersey. Shift rotation, floating, low wages and a general lack of respect from management drove Twomey and the other Englewood nurses to organize at a time when federal labor law had only just begun to recognize the union rights of registered nurses.

Englewood's management repeatedly tried to break the union. In July 1976, the hospital suspend Twomey for refusing to wear a nurse's cap. Twomey pointed out that men were not required to wear one. On October 12, 1976, the Englewood nurses successfully struck for six days over staffing, training, rotating shifts and non-nursing duties assigned to nurses.

In 1977, nurses at Pascack Valley Hospital in Westwood, New Jersey, formed a union with the assistance of the union at Englewood Hospital. But the hospital refused to recognize the union, and a 41-day strike ensued. The union won recognition as well as markedly higher wages. The union won an election at Lakeview Convalescent Center, a nursing home, the same year.

As the union expanded into non-hospital settings and non-nursing occupations, the organization recognized the need to expand its jurisdiction. So in 1978 the unions formed a statewide group, the Hospital Professionals and Allied Employees. Twomey was elected its president.

In 1979, registered nurses at newly built Palisades General Hospital in North Bergen, New Jersey, formed a union and joined HPAE.

But on September 25, 1979, the union struck Pascack Valley Hospital over wages and floating of nurses to units where they had no experience or training. The successful strike lasted 70 days.

The union organized its second nursing home, Llanfair House, in 1980.

On September 1, 1980—Labor Day—HPAE struck Englewood Hospital. Once more, the issues revolved around wages and floating. The strike lasted 98 days, and for more than two decades remained the longest strike in New Jersey history.

== Affiliation and maturity ==
The turmoil of the union's first five years led the leaders of the union to conclude that they needed the support and backing of a much larger parent union with the resources and political ability to support the union.

Rejecting the American Nurses Association as too management-dominated and the National Union of Hospital and Health Care Employees/RWDSU as too militant, the union voted in 1980 to affiliate with the AFT and its health care division, the Federation of Nurses and Health Professionals (FNHP), later known as AFT Healthcare and now known as AFT Nurses and Health Professionals.

HPAE continued to grow, but organizing came much more slowly. The union held 20 elections between 1981 and 1993, and grew from 1,000 members in 1980 to nearly 4,000 in 1993.

In 1985, the union changed its name to the Health Professionals and Allied Employees to represent its shift away from purely hospital organizing.

1993 proved to be a pivotal year for HPAE. On December 4, 1993, 680 union members struck Jersey Shore Medical Center in Neptune City, New Jersey. Pay was the primary issue. The union wanted across-the-board wage raises of 5 percent and pay increases for senior nurses. The hospital sought to impose a merit-pay system. This caused former New Jersey Governor Christine Todd Whitman to almost strip Jersey Shore University Medical Center of their Level II Trauma Center and Level III Pediatric Trauma Center certifications.

HPAE continued to marshall significant financial and political resources from its parent union and the AFL-CIO. On February 6, 1994 more than 1,000 people from several states rallied in front of the hospital in support of the freezing picketers.

In late February, the AFL-CIO announced a boycott of the hospital. The union pressured the state department of health to investigate reports of lapses in the quality of patient care; a fine as levied after inspectors discovered that a strikebreaker had administered an overdose of a sedative to a patient.

Talks between the two sides resumed in mid-February. A new contract was agreed to on March 10, 1994, largely on the union's terms.

== Restructuring and growth ==
Following the strike, Twomey pressed for a 'culture of organizing' and a renewed focus on community alliances. With the support of her executive council, the union altered its spending and staffing priorities to focus on a comprehensive, interlocking program of external organizing, enhanced political influence and legislative accomplishments.

The union's organizing program took off. Over the next 13 years, the union held 31 organizing campaigns—losing only four. As of April 2006, HPAE's membership stood at nearly 11,000, or nearly three times the number at the time of the Jersey Shore strike. The union's organizing program ran the breadth and length of New Jersey, extending into the Camden-Philadelphia market in 1996. In 2016, HPAE represents 13,000 nurses and healthcare workers in a variety of healthcare settings.

The union's political and legislative program proved equally as effective. In 1997, HPAE won amendments to NJ's whistleblower law, providing specific protections for healthcare professionals who report unsafe patient care conditions. A safe needle law followed in 2000, and a ban on mandatory overtime in 2002. And in 2005, the union won passage of a law requiring public disclosure of nurse-to-patient staffing levels in hospitals and nursing homes.

HPAE's transformation did not go unnoticed. Twomey's image appeared on the cover of the first issue of the AFL-CIO's new America@Work publication in November 1996. Twomey was elected to the AFT executive council in 2000, becoming only the second health care leader to sit on that body.

== Current projects ==
In 2004, HPAE aligned the majority of its contracts in order to set standards for care and for workplace rights. In 2006, the union began coordinated bargaining with all 20 employers. One contract expired on March 31, and the remainder expired on May 31, 2006.

HPAE also led efforts to require transparency and accountability in NJ hospitals, particularly in the for-profit takeovers.

In 2014, HPAE began a strategic planning process to help address the many challenges of hospital mergers and the intrusion of for profit hospitals into NJ. HPAE is currently implementing its second strategic plan, in response to changes in the healthcare industry. HPAE leaders and members are focusing on addressing the challenges from hospital system mergers and re-focusing their efforts to win safe staffing legislation. HPAE was and continues to be a leader in ' CPRSS', the Coalition for Patient Rights and Safe Staffing.

HPAE has continued to grow -from 4000 members in 1994 to 13,000 members in 2016, with the newest local of social workers and addiction counselors at American Addiction Centers in NJ.
