= Donald M. Payne =

American politician (1934–2012)

Don Payne
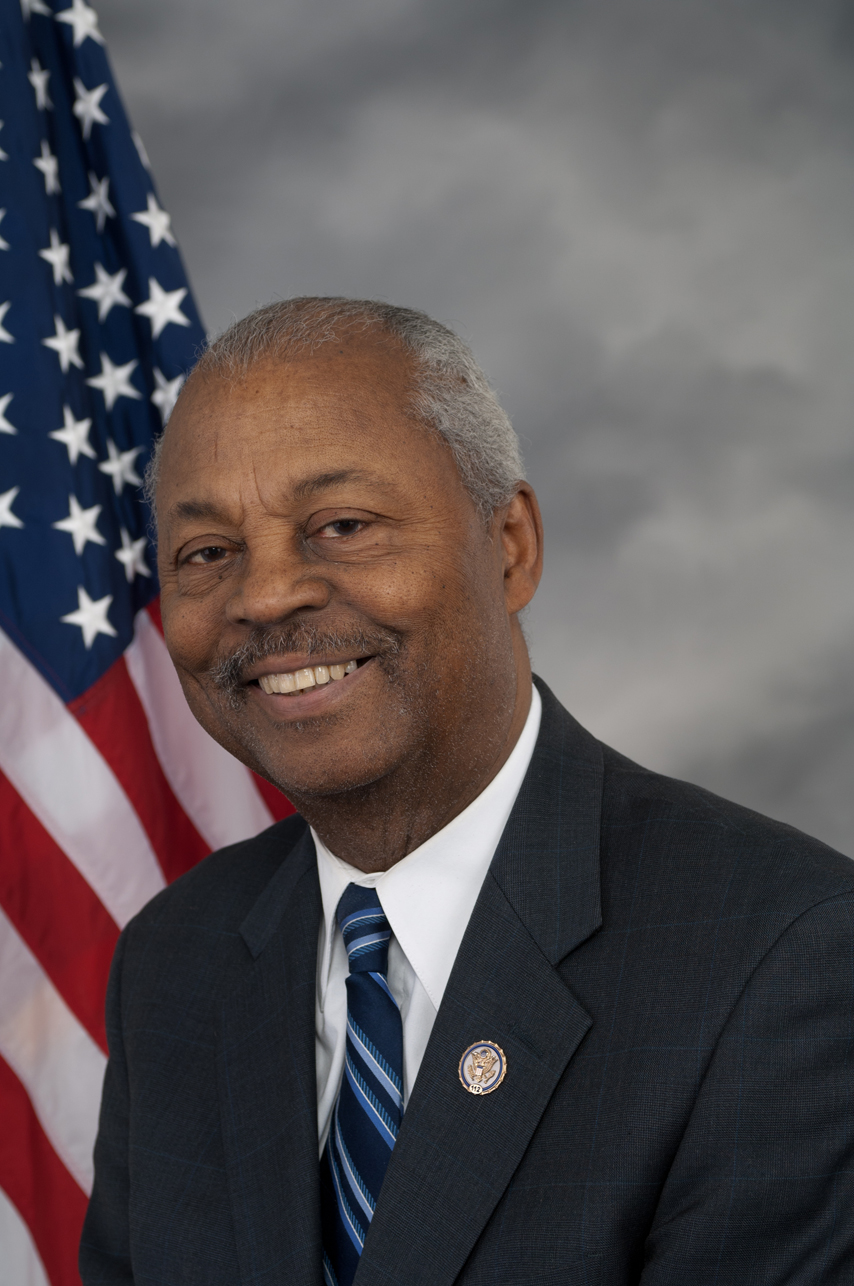

Member of the U.S. House of Representatives from New Jersey's 10th district
- In office January 3, 1989 – March 6, 2012
- Preceded by: Peter Rodino
- Succeeded by: Donald Payne Jr.

Personal details
- Born: Donald Milford Payne; July 16, 1934 Newark, New Jersey, U.S.
- Died: March 6, 2012 (aged 77) Livingston, New Jersey, U.S.
- Party: Democratic
- Spouse: Hazel Johnson (m. 1958; died 1963)
- Children: 3, including Donald
- Relatives: William D. Payne (brother); Craig A. Stanley (nephew)
- Education: Seton Hall University (BA); Springfield College (attended)
- Payne's voice Payne on the U.S. AIDS epidemic. Recorded October 4, 1999

Donald Milford Payne Sr. (July 16, 1934 – March 6, 2012) was an American politician who was the U.S. representative for New Jersey's 10th congressional district from 1989 until his death in 2012. He was a member of the Democratic Party. The district encompassed most of the city of Newark, parts of Jersey City and Elizabeth, and some suburban communities in Essex and Union counties. He was the first African American to represent New Jersey in Congress.

== Early life, education, and early political career ==
Payne was born in Newark and was a 1952 graduate of Barringer High School. He did his undergraduate studies at Seton Hall University, graduating in 1957. After graduating he pursued post-graduate studies in Springfield College in Massachusetts. Before being elected to Congress in 1988, Payne was an executive at Prudential Financial, Vice President of Urban Data Systems Inc., and a teacher in the Newark Public Schools. In 1970, Payne became the first black president of the National Council of YMCAs. From 1973 to 1981 he was Chairman of the World Y.M.C.A. Refugee and Rehabilitation Committee.

Payne's political career began in 1972, when he was elected to the Essex County Board of Chosen Freeholders, serving three terms.

In 1978, Payne ran against, and came in third to, Peter Shapiro in the June primary selecting the Democratic candidate for the first Essex County Executive, with Sheriff John F. Cryan coming in second.

In 1982, he was elected to the Newark Municipal Council and served three terms, resigning in 1988 shortly after his election to Congress.

== U.S. House of Representatives ==
=== Elections ===
As early as 1974, Payne set out to become New Jersey's first African-American congressman. He ran against U.S. Congressman Peter Rodino in the 1980 and 1986 Democratic primaries-the real contest in this heavily Democratic, black-majority district-but lost both times. Rodino retired in 1988 after 40 years in Congress. Payne defeated fellow Municipal Councilman Ralph T. Grant Jr. by a nearly 4-to-1 margin in the Democratic primary, and was handily elected in November by a nearly 8-to-1 margin. He was re-elected eleven times with no substantive opposition; his lowest margin was 75 percent in 1994.

1996 Results

- Don Payne (D) 84.16%
- Vanessa Williams (R) 14.62%
- Harley Tyler (NL) 0.79%
- Toni Jackson (SWP) 0.43%

1998 Results

- Don Payne (D) 84%
- William Wnuck (R) 11%

2000 Results

- Donald M. Payne (D) 87.5%
- Dirk B. Weber (R) 12.1%
- Maurice Williams (I) 0.4%

In the 2002 general election, Payne was reelected with 84.5% of the vote, receiving a higher margin of the vote than in any other New Jersey Congressional race run that year. In 2004, the Republicans didn't even put up a candidate, and Payne was reelected with 97% of the vote, against Green Party candidate Toy-Ling Washington and Socialist Workers Party candidate Sara J. Lobman. In 2006, Payne was unopposed in the primary and general elections. In 2008, he won 99% of the vote against Green candidate Michael Taber. In 2010, Payne defeated little-known candidate Micheal Alonso.

=== U.S. House of Representatives ===
==== General elections ====
Year	Democrat	Votes	Republican	Votes
1988	Donald M. Payne	84,681	Michael Webb	13,848

==== Primary elections ====
Year	Democrat	Votes
1980	Peter W. Rodino	26,943
1980	Donald M. Payne	9,825
1980	Golden E. Johnson	5,316
1980	Russell E. Fox	1,251

1986	Peter W. Rodino	25,136
1986	Donald M. Payne	15,216
1986	Pearl Hart	967
1986	Arthur S. Jones	931

1988	Donald M. Payne	40,608
1988	Ralph T. Grant Jr.	14,908

=== Tenure ===
Payne's voting record was considered to have been the most consistently progressive of all New Jersey Congressmen at the time of his death. He was pro-choice and against the death penalty. He was a member, and former chair, of the Congressional Black Caucus and was chosen in 2002 by House Minority Leader Nancy Pelosi to serve on the Democratic Steering Committee. The Democratic Steering Committee chooses which House Committees each individual Democratic Congressmen will serve on and also plays a crucial part in shaping the Democratic legislative agenda. In international issues, Payne was active on issues relating to Africa, particularly regarding the conflict in the Darfur region of Sudan and the Western Sahara conflict.

As a leading advocate of education, Payne was instrumental in the passage of key legislation, including the Goals 2000 initiative to improve elementary and secondary schools; the School-to-Work Opportunities Act; the National Service Act, establishment of the National Literacy Institute; and funding for Head Start, Pell Grants, Summer Jobs and Student Loans.

Payne was also a member of the U.S. House Committee on Foreign Affairs, where he served as Chairman of the United States House Foreign Affairs Subcommittee on Africa and Global Health and as a member of the Subcommittee on the United States House Foreign Affairs Subcommittee on the Western Hemisphere and the United States House Foreign Affairs Subcommittee on International Organizations, Human Rights, and Oversight. Congressman Payne was at the forefront of efforts to restore democracy and human rights in nations throughout the globe. He was one of five members of Congress chosen to accompany President Bill Clinton and Hillary Clinton on their historic six-nation tour of Africa. He also headed a Presidential mission to war-torn Rwanda to help find solutions to that country's political and humanitarian crises. In addition, he was recognized as having the most supportive record in Congress on issues involving the Northern Ireland peace process.

On June 22, 2001 Payne was arrested after protesting against the Sudanese government at its embassy in Washington, D.C. He was a supporter of and endorsed the Genocide Intervention Network.

In 2003, President George W. Bush appointed Payne as one of two members of Congress to serve as a Congressional delegate to the United Nations and reappointed him in 2005 to an unprecedented second term. In this role, he met with the U.N. Secretary General, the U.S. Ambassador to the U.N. and regularly attended sessions of the U.N. General Assembly and other high level meetings.

He was one of the 31 House Democrats who voted to not count the 20 electoral votes from Ohio in the 2004 presidential election. President George W. Bush won Ohio by 118,457 votes. Without Ohio's electoral votes, the election would have been decided by the U.S. House of Representatives, with each state having one vote in accordance with the Twelfth Amendment to the United States Constitution.

Payne received an "A" on the liberal Drum Major Institute's 2005 Congressional Scorecard on middle-class issues.

Payne served on the board of directors of the National Endowment for Democracy, TransAfrica, Discovery Channel Global Education Fund, the Congressional Award Foundation, the Boys and Girls Clubs of Newark, the Newark Day Center, the Fighting Back Initiative and the Newark YMCA. He received numerous awards and honors from national, international and community-based organizations, including the Visionaries Award bestowed by the Africa Society and the prestigious Democracy Service Medal, which was previously awarded to Lech Walesa, the former Polish President and founder of the Solidarity movement, by the National Endowment for Democracy.

Payne supported Senator Barack Obama in his bid for the Democratic presidential nomination after originally supporting Hillary Clinton.

The Donald M. Payne International Development Fellowship is named in his honor.

In 1997, Donald Payne delivered the keynote address at the Ugandan North American Association (UNAA) convention in Washington, D.C.

Attack in Somalia

On April 13, 2009, Payne's plane was departing from Mogadishu, Somalia, when Somali fighters fired mortars at the airport. Payne was unhurt, as his plane was already bound for Kenya. The attack came just one day after Captain Richard Phillips was rescued from Somali pirates after their failed hijacking of the MV Maersk Alabama. Payne stated that his party on the plane did not know the airport was attacked until after they arrived in Kenya.

=== Committee assignments ===
- Committee on Education and the Workforce
  - Subcommittee on Early Childhood, Elementary and Secondary Education
  - Subcommittee on Workforce Protections
- Committee on Foreign Affairs
  - Subcommittee on Africa and Global Health
  - Subcommittee on the Western Hemisphere

=== Caucus memberships ===
- Congressional Black Caucus
- Congressional Human Rights Caucus
- International Conservation Caucus
- Silk Road Congressional Caucus
- Congressional Arts Caucus
- Congressional Wildlife Refuge Caucus

== Personal life ==
Several other of Payne's family members have held or currently hold public office. His son, Donald M. Payne Jr., was president of the Municipal Council of Newark and an Essex County Freeholder-At-Large. Don Jr. was also elected to fill his father's seat in Congress on November 6, 2012. His brother, William D. Payne, served in the New Jersey General Assembly from 1998 to 2008. His nephew, Craig A. Stanley, served in the General Assembly from 1996 to 2008.

== Death ==
Payne announced in a statement on February 10, 2012 that he was undergoing treatment for colon cancer. On March 2, 2012, it was reported that Payne had been flown from a hospital in Washington D.C. back to New Jersey via a medical transport plane, because he was "gravely ill". Payne died four days later, aged 77.

Payne was succeeded in Congress by his son, Donald Payne Jr., who served six terms until his death in office from a heart attack in 2024.

== See also ==
- List of African-American United States representatives
- List of members of the United States Congress who died in office (2000–present)#2010s

U.S. House of Representatives
Preceded by Peter Rodino	Member of the U.S. House of Representatives from New Jersey's 10th congressional district 1989–2012	Succeeded by Donald Payne Jr.
Preceded by Kweisi Mfume	Chair of the Congressional Black Caucus; 1995–1997	Succeeded by Maxine Waters
