= Craig A. Stanley =

American politician

Member of the New Jersey General Assembly from the 28th district
- In office January 9, 1996 – January 8, 2008 Serving with Wilfredo Caraballo, Donald Kofi Tucker, Evelyn Williams and Oadline Truitt
- Preceded by: Harry A. McEnroe; James Zangari
- Succeeded by: Ralph R. Caputo; Cleopatra Tucker

Personal details
- Born: November 20, 1955 (age 70) Newark, New Jersey
- Party: Democratic
- Relatives: Donald M. Payne (uncle); William D. Payne (uncle); Donald Payne Jr. (cousin)
- Education: University of Hartford (BA); Baruch College (MPA)

Craig A. Stanley (born November 20, 1955) is an American Democratic Party politician, who served in the New Jersey General Assembly from 1996 to 2008, where represented the 28th Legislative District. He was succeeded by Ralph R. Caputo and Cleopatra Tucker.

Born and raised in Newark, New Jersey, Stanley graduated from Newark Arts High School.

Stanley served in the Assembly on the Education Committee (as Chair), on the Joint Committee on the Public Schools (as Co-Chair), the Higher Education committee and the Military and Veterans' Affairs Committee.

Stanley was introduced at an early age to politics through the YMWCA's Youth and Government Program then run by his uncle, Donald M. Payne, who served as a U.S. Congressman from 1989 until his death in 2012. He is also a nephew of former Assemblyman William D. Payne. As an adult, Stanley became an advisor to the YMWCA's Youth and Government Program and was appointed in 1990 as its Coordinator.

Stanley received a B.A. in 1978 from University of Hartford in Political Science and was awarded an M.P.A. in 1999 from Baruch College in Public Administration. Assemblyman Stanley is a part-time professor at Essex County College. He was born in Newark, and currently resides in Irvington.
