= Ralph R. Caputo =

American politician (born 1940)

Member of the New Jersey General Assembly
- In office January 8, 2008 – March 22, 2023 Serving with Cleopatra Tucker
- Preceded by: Craig A. Stanley; Oadline Truitt
- Succeeded by: Jackie Yustein
- Constituency: 28th district
- In office January 9, 1968 – October 4, 1971 Serving with C. Richard Fiore
- Preceded by: District created
- Succeeded by: Carl Orechio; John N. Dennis
- Constituency: 11-C district

Essex County Freeholder from District 5
- In office January 1, 2003 – December 31, 2011
- Preceded by: Joseph P. Scarpelli
- Succeeded by: Brendan W. Gill

Personal details
- Born: October 31, 1940 (age 86)
- Party: Democratic (by 1982)
- Other political affiliations: Republican (through 1971)
- Spouse: Celeste
- Children: 2
- Education: Barringer High School
- Alma mater: Bloomfield College (B.A); Newark State College; Seton Hall University (M.A.)
- Occupation: Politician
- Website: Assemblyman Caputo's legislative webpage

Ralph R. Caputo (born October 31, 1940) is an American Democratic Party politician, who served in the New Jersey General Assembly from 2008 to 2023, where he represented the 28th Legislative District. He had previously served on the Essex County Board of Chosen Freeholders from 2003 to 2011 and as a Republican in the General Assembly from 1968 until 1972.

In February 2023, Caputo announced that he would leave office once he was nominated and confirmed by the Senate to serve as a director of Horizon Blue Cross Blue Shield of New Jersey. He left office on March 22, 2023, a day after his nomination to the position was confirmed by the New Jersey Senate.

== Biography ==
Born and raised in Newark, Caputo graduated in 1958 from Barringer High School. Caputo received a B.A. in 1963 from Bloomfield College with a major in history and education, and was awarded a M.A. in 1975 from Seton Hall University in Educational Administration. He also attended Newark State College (now Kean University) and received a graduate certification (Supervisor) in education. After college, he began his career as an elementary school teacher in Newark. Between his stints in elected office, he was an urban education specialist for the State Department of Education, an advisor to the State Commissioner of Education, and a northern area chief for the Title 1 Office. He served as a superintendent for Essex County schools, an assistant superintendent of Essex County Vocational Technical Schools, and an associate superintendent for the Orange Board of Education. Beginning in 1983, he worked as a marketing executive for Atlantic City casinos Trump Castle Hotel and Casino, the Tropicana Casino & Resort Atlantic City, and the Showboat Atlantic City.

A long-time resident of Belleville, he is now a resident of Nutley. He is married to Celeste and has two grown children.

== Political career ==
Caputo along with C. Richard Fiore were elected as Republicans to the State Assembly in 1967, defeating Eugene Molinaro and Warren Davis in the Republican primary and Democratic incumbents Armand Lembo and Joseph Biancardi. At the time of his election at age 27, he was the youngest person ever elected to the State Legislature. They represented Essex County's District 11-C, a new district created in 1967 following the elimination of countywide at-large Assembly districts. Caputo and Fiore were re-elected in 1969 against Democrats Carmen Orechio and Joseph Iannuzzi. During his first two terms in the Assembly, Caputo advocated for the construction of a casino in Newark. Caputo lost the backing of the Essex County Republican organization when he ran for a third term in 1971, and lost the GOP primary to Carl Orechio and John N. Dennis. He resigned his seat before his term ended effective October 4, 1971.

By 1982, Caputo had become a Democrat. That year, he ran in the Democratic primary for Essex County Executive but was defeated by incumbent Peter Shapiro and East Orange mayor Thomas H. Cooke Jr. In 2002, Caputo mounted a political comeback by running for a seat on the Essex County Board of Chosen Freeholders from District 5 consisting of Belleville, Bloomfield, Glen Ridge, Montclair, and Nutley. Running as a Democrat, he defeated incumbent Republican Freeholder Joseph P. Scarpelli. During his tenure on the Freeholder board, he reached the position of Vice President of the board. He would be re-elected to two-more three-year terms until he retired from the board in 2011 citing the difficulties of holding two elected offices serving almost two different constituencies.

In December 2005, following the death of 28th District Assemblyman Donald Kofi Tucker, Caputo sought the nomination of being appointed to the vacant seat by the local county Democratic committee. He lost the convention vote 73%-27% to Evelyn Williams. In 2007, Caputo along with Tucker's widow Cleopatra ran in the Democratic primary for the same Assembly seat. With the backing of Newark Mayor Cory Booker, Caputo and Tucker defeated incumbents Craig A. Stanley and Oadline Truitt in the primary. In the run-up to the general election, opponents used old articles from the 1960s and 70s to tie Caputo to controversial Newark activist Anthony Imperiale. Caputo stated that he never supported Imperiale's positions. Upon Caputo's win in the general election, he returned to the Assembly after a 36-year gap, the second-longest gap in the state's history.

From 2008 to 2011, Caputo simultaneously held his seat in the New Jersey General Assembly and as Freeholder. Such dual-office holding, unique to New Jersey, was allowed under a grandfather clause in the state law enacted by the New Jersey Legislature and signed into law by Governor of New Jersey Jon Corzine in September 2007 that prohibited future dual-office-holding but allowed for those who had held both positions as of February 1, 2008, to remain.

He would be easily re-elected to a fourth two-year term in 2009 but would face an unusual difficulty in 2011. After Belleville was removed from the 28th District in the 2011 legislative redistricting, Caputo moved to Nutley, New Jersey in order to seek reelection in the 28th District. The move led then-incumbent 36th District Assemblyman Kevin J. Ryan to retire from the Assembly as he too was a resident of Nutley.

Caputo draws both a pension for his career in education and another for his many years in the state legislature. At the same time, he also draws a salary as a sitting legislator. This is a legal practice in New Jersey often referred to as "double dipping."

Caputo resigned from office on March 22, 2023, after he was confirmed by the Senate to serve on the board of Horizon Blue Cross Blue Shield of New Jersey. Jackie Yustein of Glen Ridge was selected by Democrats to fill the balance of Caputo's term of office and was sworn in on May 25, 2023.

== Electoral history ==
=== Essex County Board of Chosen Freeholders ===
Board of Chosen Freeholders District 5 general election, 2008
Party	Candidate	Votes	%
Democratic	Ralph R. Caputo	37,975	69.98
Republican	Andrew M. Bloschk	16,253	29.95
Total votes		54,228	99.93

==== Democratic Primaries ====
Board of Chosen Freeholders District 5 Democratic Primaries, 2008
Candidate	Votes	%
Ralph R. Caputo	3,747	52.21
Robert J. Russo	3,426	47.74
Total votes	7,173	99.94

New Jersey General Assembly
Preceded by Craig A. Stanley; Oadline Truitt	Member of the New Jersey General Assembly for the 28th District; January 8, 2008 – present With: Cleopatra Tucker	Succeeded by Incumbent
Preceded by District created	Member of the New Jersey General Assembly for District 11-C; January 9, 1968 – October 4, 1971; With: C. Richard Fiore	Succeeded by Carl Orechio; John N. Dennis
Political offices
Preceded by Joseph P. Scarpelli	Essex County Freeholder from District 5 January 1, 2003 – December 31, 2011	Succeeded by Brendan W. Gill
