= Jackie Yustein =

Member of the New Jersey General Assembly

Member of the New Jersey General Assembly from the 28th district
- In office May 25, 2023 – January 9, 2024 Serving with Cleopatra Tucker
- Preceded by: Ralph R. Caputo
- Succeeded by: Garnet Hall

Personal details
- Party: Democratic
- Website: Legislative webpage

Jacqueline S. Yustein is a Democratic Party politician who was designated to represent the 28th legislative district in the New Jersey General Assembly, succeeding Ralph R. Caputo, who left office the previous month. She was sworn into office on May 25, 2023.

== Political career ==
A former member of the Glen Ridge Borough Council, Yustein will serve the balance of Caputo's term of office, but will not seek election in November 2023, when Glen Ridge is moved to the 34th Legislative District.

=== District 28 ===
Each of the 40 districts in the New Jersey Legislature has one representative in the New Jersey Senate and two members in the New Jersey General Assembly. The representatives from the 28th District for the 2022—23 Legislative Session are:

- Senator Renee Burgess (D)
- Assemblywoman Cleopatra Tucker (D)
- Assemblywoman Jackie Yustein (D)
