= Michael F. Adubato =

American politician (1934–1993)

Member of the New Jersey General Assembly
- In office January 8, 1974 – January 14, 1992 Serving with Anthony Imperiale, John F. Cali, and James Zangari
- Preceded by: Newly created
- Succeeded by: Harry A. McEnroe; James Zangari
- Constituency: 30th district (1974–1982); 28th district (1982–1992)

Personal details
- Born: September 15, 1934 Newark, New Jersey, U.S.
- Died: February 27, 1993 (aged 58) Belleville, New Jersey, U.S.
- Party: Democratic
- Spouse: Peggy
- Children: 3
- Education: Seton Hall University; Jersey City State College
- Occupation: Insurance executive

Michael F. Adubato (September 15, 1934 – February 27, 1993) was an American Democratic Party politician who served nine consecutive terms, a total of 18 years, in the New Jersey General Assembly from 1974 to 1992, representing the 28th Legislative District for four terms and then being shifted after redistricting to the 30th Legislative District where he served for an additional five terms.

== Early life and education ==
Born in Newark, on September 15, 1934, Adubato graduated from Our Lady of Good Counsel High School. He attended both Seton Hall University and Jersey City State College (now New Jersey City University).

== Election history ==
When the 40-district map for the New Jersey Legislature was created in 1973, the 30th District was based in Essex and Hudson counties, and consisted of the Ironbound neighborhood and a portion of the North Ward of Newark, together with Belleville in Essex County, and Harrison, East Newark, Kearny, and Secaucus in Hudson County. Adubato was elected together with running mate John F. Cali in 1973, and was re-elected together with him in 1975 and 1977. In 1979, Adubato was elected together with Republican Anthony Imperiale, who had represented the district in the New Jersey Senate from 1974 to 1978 as an independent, while Cali came in third. In the 1981 redistricting following the 1980 United States census, Adubato was shifted to the 28th Legislative District which consisted entirely of Irvington and portions of Newark's North and West wards. Adubato was elected in the 28th District together with Democratic running mate James Zangari in 1981, 1983, 1985, 1987 and 1989. Adubato did not run for a tenth term in 1991.

== Assembly legislation ==
After Newark Mayor Kenneth A. Gibson and his city council approved a series of salary increases of up to 50% for the city's elected officials in July 1974 and after the Mayor and council refused to rescind the increases, Adubato led a group of fellow Assemblymembers to block a series of measures that had been under consideration for adoption by the Assembly that would have allowed the city of Newark to increase taxes and fees on income and other charges that would have brought the city $18 million in revenue. Adubato said that "the recent irresponsibility exhibited by the Newark City Council in raising their salaries substantially" had justified the move, while a city spokesperson argued that "the legislators are threatening to withhold $18‐million in special tax revenue from city residents" over raises that totaled $150,000 for elected officials and department heads. The bill was released after several city councilmembers met with the Taxation Committee and argued that the fiscal impact of the loss of revenue would be damaging to the city; several Assemblymembers opposed holding the bill "hostage" to Adubato's efforts to get the raises rescinded.

With a state income tax being implemented in 1976, Adubato argued that it was unfair for Bergen County, the state's wealthiest, to get as much as Essex County as part of the bills revenue sharing provisions, insisting that a greater share of the revenue should go to New Jersey's cities, which suffer most from the impacts of unemployment.

In April 1977, Adubato introduced a bill, co-sponsored by 45 of the 80 Assembly members, that would put a referendum on the ballot asking voters to approve a school voucher plan under which parents would receive a voucher that could be used at any school of their choice, public or private, in an amount equal to the amount the state spends per pupil on education. Federal District Court judge Henry Curtis Meanor issued a February 1978 ruling that struck down the law, which permitted parents to deduct from their gross income up to $1,000 of tuition paid for each child attending a non-public school, the only such program in any U.S. state where income tax was assessed. Meanor ruled that the deduction was inconsistent with the protections in the First Amendment to the United States Constitution. Adubato, sponsor of the section of the state tax code authorizing the deduction that was ruled unconstitutional and parent of three children who were attending Catholic schools, argued that "the public school systems in our country are a failure" with "a much better education in the private and parochial schools" and said that he would work to find some other way to pass legislation to reinstate the deduction.

In July 1981, Adubato objected on the floor of the Assembly to the newly opened 20,000-seat Brendan Byrne Arena at the Meadowlands Sports Complex being named after the sitting governor by what Adubato described as "a group of people appointed by Governor Byrne deciding to name the facility the Brendan T. Byrne Arena". Adubato registered his objections to the name saying that the name "idolizes, sainthoods and anoints a human being".

An insurance agent by profession, Adubato was the sponsor of the Automobile Insurance Reform Act, a bill that eliminated the assigned risk pool of 1.4 million drivers, more than 40% of the state's 3.3 million drivers, who had been rejected by their insurance companies and had been assigned to carriers. Under the terms of the bill signed by Governor of New Jersey Thomas Kean after being vetoed twice by his predecessor Brendan Byrne, these motorists would be covered by the Joint Underwriting Association starting in January 1984. A series of amendments impacting drivers and sponsored by Adubato passed both houses in January 1984, providing funding for the joint pool through a $1,000 surcharge per year for three years on drunk drivers, a $100 surcharge on those with DWI convictions to pay for added policing and a rejection of an across-the-board $90 surcharge assessed on all auto insurance coverage. Upon leaving the Assembly, he continued his involvement on insurance issues as an advisor to legislators on related matters.

== Death ==
He died of a heart attack on February 27, 1993, at the age of 58 at Clara Maass Medical Center in Belleville, New Jersey.

Adubato's daughter Lisa was nominated by Governor of New Jersey Chris Christie to serve as a judge in New Jersey Superior Court. His nephew, Steve, served the 20th District in the Assembly from 1984 to 1986; Michael and Steve Adubato became the only uncle and nephew to serve simultaneously in the legislature.

New Jersey General Assembly
Preceded by Newly created	Member of the New Jersey General Assembly from the 30th district January 8, 1974–January 12, 1982; Served alongside: John F. Cali, Anthony Imperiale	Succeeded by Marion Crecco; John V. Kelly
Preceded by Harry A. McEnroe	Member of the New Jersey General Assembly from the 28th district January 12, 1982–January 14, 1992; Served alongside: James Zangari	Succeeded by Harry A. McEnroe; James Zangari
