= Oadline Truitt =

American politician

Oadline Truitt (born August 2, 1940) is an American Democratic Party politician, who served in the New Jersey General Assembly from 2006 to 2008, where she represented the 28th legislative district.

Truitt served in the Assembly as a member of the Education Committee.

== Biography ==
A librarian in Irvington and a longtime resident of Newark, Truitt was elected by the Essex County Democratic Committee on February 2, 2006 to fill the vacancy caused by the resignation of former Assemblywoman Evelyn Williams. She was sworn into the Assembly on February 9, 2006. Assemblywoman Truitt is a longtime Democratic Party activist in Newark.

Assemblywoman Williams had been elected in December 2005 to fill the vacancy caused by the death of former Assemblyman Donald Kofi Tucker. Williams was elected to fill the remainder of Tucker's term though January 10, 2006 and to serve until a November 2006 election could be held to fill the remainder of the term through January 2008. Williams resigned following her arrest for shoplifting and a pension scandal. Her resignation covered the term starting on January 10, 2006. Truitt was elected to serve a term through the certification of the November 2006 election.

Assemblywoman Truitt sought the remainder of the two-year term in the November 2006 special election. In the Democratic primary she overwhelmingly defeated Newark Board of Education President Alton Wheeler. As no Republican candidate filed in the race, Assemblywoman Truitt won the remainder of the term unopposed.

Truitt earned a B.S. from Kean College in Education/Library Media. Truitt works as a School Librarian for the Irvington Public Schools. She has served on the Newark Rent Control Board since 1997.

== Election dispute ==
Truitt was originally elected during a special election convention on January 9, 2006. This meeting came under dispute when it was discovered that only three days' notice had been given for the meeting, when state law required seven days' notice. In addition there were concerns if a quorum of delegates was present. The Essex County Democrats and New Jersey Democratic State Committee Chairwoman Bonnie Watson Coleman would not certify her original election so she could take the oath of office.

The Democratic Committee rescheduled the meeting and Truitt won the second convention as well. In the second convention, she defeated Cleopatra Tucker, the widow of Assemblyman Tucker.

== 2007 Democratic Primary ==
Truitt and Assemblyman Craig Stanley were challenged by Mrs. Tucker and Essex County Freeholder Ralph Caputo, a former state assemblyman, who defeated both of them. The Tucker/Caputo ticket was supported by Newark Mayor Cory Booker who was trying to elect his own supporters to the State Legislature. Assemblywoman Truitt finished fourth in the four way Assembly race.

== District 28 ==
Each of the forty districts in the New Jersey Legislature has one representative in the New Jersey Senate and two members in the New Jersey General Assembly. The other representatives from the 28th Legislative District are:

- Assemblyman Craig A. Stanley and
- Senator Ronald Rice

Preceded by Evelyn Williams	New Jersey State Assemblywoman - 28th Legislative District; January 2006-January 2008	Succeeded by Cleopatra Tucker
