= Ronald L. Rice =

American politician (1945–2023)

Member of the New Jersey Senate from the 28th district
- In office December 4, 1986 – August 31, 2022
- Preceded by: John P. Caufield
- Succeeded by: Renee Burgess

Deputy Mayor of Newark
- In office July 1, 2002 – July 1, 2006

Member of the Newark City Council
- In office July 1, 1982 – July 1, 1998

Personal details
- Born: December 18, 1945 Richmond, Virginia, U.S.
- Died: March 15, 2023 (aged 77) Newark, New Jersey, U.S.
- Party: Democratic
- Website: Legislative Website

Military service
- Years of service: 1966–1970
- Rank: Sergeant
- Battles/wars: Vietnam War

Ronald L. Rice (December 18, 1945 – March 15, 2023) was an American Democratic Party politician who served in the New Jersey State Senate from 1986 to 2022. He represented the 28th Legislative District. Rice is one of the longest-serving state senators in New Jersey history.

== Early life ==
Rice received an A.S. from Essex County College in Police Science, a B.S. from John Jay College of Criminal Justice in Administration and Planning, and an M.A. from Rutgers University in Criminal Justice. He has also attended but never graduated from the Rutgers School of Law—Newark. He served as a Sergeant in the U.S. Marines from 1966 to 1970, in the Vietnam War. Before entering politics, Rice was a police officer with the Newark Police Department for eight years, then a security employee for PSE&G.

== Newark City Council ==
Rice served 16 years on the Newark City Council (1982-1998), and he was the Deputy Mayor of Newark from 2002 until March 2006. He stepped down as deputy mayor in order to run for mayor. As dual office holding was not banned in New Jersey, he was able to serve on both the city council and in the State Senate at the same time.

== New Jersey Senate ==
Following the death of John P. Caufield in August 1986, Rice was elected in a special election to serve the 28th district and was seated on December 4, 1986. He never received less than two thirds of the vote in any of his Senate general elections, though he faced close challenges in the Democratic primaries from Laurence Brown in 1997, Assemblyman Willie B. Brown in 2001, and Freeholder D. Bilal Beasley in 2007. He was one of only two Democrats in the Senate to vote no on two bills to legalize same-sex marriage in New Jersey in 2009 and 2012, the other twice-dissenting Democrat was Jeff Van Drew. Rice was one of New Jersey's presidential electors in the 2004 presidential election, for Democratic candidate John Kerry. He was a leading opponent of legislation in the 218th New Jersey Legislature to legalize marijuana in New Jersey, arguing that legalization would force urban neighborhoods to "struggle against the spread of 'marijuana bodegas' disguised as dispensaries".

=== Committees ===
Committee assignments for the current session (until his resignation on August 31, 2022) are:

- Community and Urban Affairs, Vice-Chair
- Joint Committee on Housing Affordability
- Joint Committee on Economic Justice and Equal Employment Opportunities
- Joint Committee on the Public Schools
- Health, Human Services and Senior Citizens

=== District 28 ===
Each of the 40 districts in the New Jersey Legislature has one representative in the New Jersey Senate and two members in the New Jersey General Assembly. The representatives from the 28th District for the 2022—23 Legislative Session are:

- Senator Ronald Rice (D)
- Assemblyman Ralph Caputo (D)
- Assemblywoman Cleopatra Tucker (D)

== Newark mayoral bids ==
=== 1998 ===
Rice had run unsuccessfully for Mayor of Newark in 1998 being defeated by incumbent mayor (and future Senate colleague) Sharpe James, who won with 56% of the vote; Rice was in second, with 28%.

=== 2006 ===
On March 6, 2006, Rice entered the mayoral race again, noting "that Mayor James had encouraged him to run but noted that if the mayor decided to join the race, his candidacy could change." On March 27, 2006, James announced that he would not seek a sixth term, preferring to focus on his seat in the New Jersey Senate. On Election Day, May 9, 2006, Newark's nonpartisan election took place. Former City Councilman Cory Booker won with 72% of the vote, soundly defeating Rice, the runner-up, who received 23%.

== Personal life and death ==
Rice left office on August 31, 2022, due to health issues. He died on March 15, 2023, in Newark, New Jersey. He was 77.

His son, Ronald C. Rice, is a former city councilman in Newark, New Jersey.

New Jersey Senate
Preceded by John P. Caufield	Member of the New Jersey Senate from the 28th district December 4, 1986 – August 31, 2022	Succeeded by Incumbent
