= James Zangari =

American politician

Member of the New Jersey General Assembly from the 28th district
- In office January 8, 1980 – January 9, 1996 Serving with Harry A. McEnroe (1980-82, 1992-96); Michael F. Adubato (1982-92)
- Preceded by: Remay Pearce; Mary Scanlon
- Succeeded by: Wilfredo Caraballo; Craig A. Stanley

Member of the Essex County Board of Chosen Freeholders
- In office 1978–1979
- Succeeded by: Daniel Tindell III

Personal details
- Born: March 30, 1929 Newark, New Jersey
- Died: February 15, 2011 (aged 81) Newark, New Jersey
- Party: Democratic

Military service
- Allegiance: United States
- Branch/service: United States Army
- Battles/wars: Korean War

James Zangari (March 30, 1929 – February 15, 2011) was an American Democratic Party politician who served in the New Jersey General Assembly from the 28th district from 1980 to 1996. He was known for an unsuccessful struggle to institute a moment of silence in New Jersey public schools which was ruled unconstitutional by the United States District Court for the District of New Jersey.

== Early life and education ==
James Zangari was born on March 30, 1929, in Newark, New Jersey. He was one of eight children born to Italian immigrants Pietro and Francesca Zangari. His mother died from complications during childbirth in 1939, and James and his siblings were placed in various Newark orphanages until his sister was old enough to serve as their guardian. He attended Newark public schools and studied in Italy for four years.

Zangari was stationed in Japan with the United States Army from 1946 to 1947. After returning to the United States, he worked in his family's construction business. In 1972, he was appointed as director of housing for the suburb of Irvington. He held the position until 1982, and his work on urban renewal was cited in the Congressional Record.

== Political career ==
=== Essex County freeholder ===
Zangari won his first political office in 1977, when he won a seat on the Essex County Board of Chosen Freeholders with more votes than any candidate in the county.

During his tenure as freeholder, Zangari took a particular interest in the county geriatric facility, which was known for its dysfunction. He set up an office within the facility and was widely credited with single-handedly overhauling its hospital operations.

As a freeholder, Zangari faced an immediate campaign for re-election in 1978 as the result of reforms to the county charter which introduced a county executive and replaced the nine-member, at-large board with a combined at-large and district-based system of elections. Zangari ran with the support of sheriff John Cryan to represent District 3, which included his hometown of Irvington, as well as South Orange, Maplewood, and parts of East Orange. He was challenged in the June primary by Daniel L. Tindell III of East Orange, a reformist supported by Peter Shapiro, and Goldie Burbage, a local community leader supported by Donald Payne. Tindell defeated Zangari by 893 votes, carrying Maplewood and South Orange, while Burbage won the portion of East Orange inside the district and Zangari held Irvington.

=== New Jersey General Assembly ===
In 1979, he was elected into the New Jersey General Assembly, where he served until 1996. He eventually became the deputy speaker and chairperson of the committee which oversaw Atlantic City casinos and the Meadlowlands Sports Complex. According to his son, Zangari was most proud of his sponsorship of the Leaking Underground Storage Tank Act, the first legislation in the nation dealing with the subject, and a bill requiring all auto parts to include serial numbering. Zangari was known for his love of Italian cooking and set up a kitchenette in his legislative district office, where he routinely hosted small lunches with colleagues of both parties.

Zangari was initially elected to the Assembly by internal party maneuvering; after the 1979 primary, state senator Martin Greenberg of South Orange resigned, and assemblyman John P. Caufield became the Democratic candidate for his seat, which included Irvington and the western portion of Newark. The local Democratic Party replaced Caufield on the Assembly ticket with Zangari, and he and running mate Harry A. McEnroe won the general election by a wide margin. Zangari did not run in the special election to complete Caufield's ten-week term in the Assembly.

In 1982, Zangari was the chief sponsor of a bill to introduce a one-minute silence at the start of each day in New Jersey public schools. During the legislative debate, one senator argued that it would mean "bringing prayer back into the schools through the front door," which Zangari denied. Although the bill passed by large margins in both houses twice, it was vetoed by both Brendan Byrne and Tom Kean on the grounds that it violated the constitution of the United States. Although the bill passed over Kean's veto, the American Civil Liberties Union of New Jersey challenged the policy in court. New Jersey Attorney General Irwin I. Kimmelman declined to argue the case, the legislature hired its own attorney. District court judge Dickinson R. Debevoiseheld in May v. Cooperman that the omission of the word "prayer" in the bill was a "cosmetic change" and that the policy would "jeopardize the religious liberties of members of the community and breaches the proper degree of separation between the spheres of religion and government." Debevoise further held that those who professed no religious beliefs could find any form of prayer offensive. Zangari announced that he was "very, very disappointed" in the decision and expected the legislature to appeal, but Assembly speaker Alan Karcher declined. A lawsuit challenging the issue eventually reached the Supreme Court of the United States, where the lower court's ruling was affirmed.

In 1988, Zangari introduced a bill to allow the beachfront community of Ortley Beach to secede from Dover Township (today Toms River) in Ocean County, from which it was separated by the Barnegat Bay. The bill, which would have made Ortley Beach the first new municipality in the state since Victory Gardens in 1951, was unsuccessful.

On one occasion during his tenure, a gay rights group protested the Assembly by throwing condoms from the balcony. According to Loretta Weinberg, Zangari collected the condoms in his briefcase.

In 1995, Zangari chose not to seek re-election. Upon his retirement, friends and colleagues from across the political spectrum recorded a farewell message celebrating his long career. His decision to retire to a fight over his successor between his long-time running mate, Harry McEnroe, and county party chairman Thomas P. Giblin. Giblin's refusal to support McEnroe's preferred candidate, Irvington mayor Michael G. Steele, led Giblin to provide the county line to Wilfredo Caraballo and Craig A. Stanley over McEnroe, who then lost a contested primary with Steele as his running mate.

== Personal life and death ==
Zangari married Anna Valvano in 1950, and they had four children, Peter, James Jr., Francesca, and Ted. Upon his retirement, the couple relocated to Boca Raton, Florida.

Outside of politics, Zangari was extensively involved in charities to aid children with intellectual and developmental disabilities and their families.

He died of cancer on February 15, 2011, in Newark, New Jersey at age 81.
