= John P. Caufield =

American politician and public safety official

Member of the New Jersey Senate from the 28th district
- In office November 13, 1979 – August 24, 1986
- Preceded by: Martin L. Greenberg
- Succeeded by: Ronald Rice

Personal details
- Born: September 21, 1918 Newark, New Jersey
- Died: August 24, 1986 (aged 67) Orange, New Jersey
- Party: Democratic
- Spouse: Anne Elizabeth Walsh (m. 1945)
- Children: 9

John Pershing Caufield (September 21, 1918 – August 24, 1986) was an American Democratic Party politician and public safety official from Newark, New Jersey. He served 24 years as the Fire Director for the Newark Fire Department and seven years in the New Jersey Senate.

== Biography ==
Caufield was born on September 21, 1918, in Newark, the seventh of thirteen children, to James Caufield, a fireman, and Louisa Doll. He attended Sacred Heart School in Vailsburg and Seton Hall Prep before enlisting in the United States Navy following the Pearl Harbor attack. He married Anne Elizabeth Walsh before his discharge in 1945 and had nine children with her. They lived in the Vailsburg neighborhood of Newark. Prior to becoming Fire Director, he worked as a Newark policeman, a court attendant, a court clerk, and a lieutenant in the Essex County Prosecutor's Office.

Beginning in 1962, he was appointed Newark Fire Director. During the 1967 riots, he was at the scene of Engine Company #11 Captain Michael Moran's death when he was shot by a sniper's bullet. In 1970, he was fired by Mayor Hugh Addonizio because of Caufield preparing to run for mayor himself. In the May 1970 mayoral primary, Caufield placed fourth behind Kenneth A. Gibson, Addonizio, and activist Anthony Imperiale. As Gibson received less than 50% of the vote, he was forced into a runoff election with Addonizio to be held in June. Caufield endorsed Gibson in the runoff. After Gibson won the runoff and was inaugurated, Caufield was reinstated as Fire Director.

In 1979, Caufield was one of two Democratic organization-backed candidates for the office of Member of the General Assembly from the 28th district. He and Harry A. McEnroe won the primary against seven other candidates. However, incumbent State Senator Martin L. Greenberg resigned in August 1979 requiring a special election to be held that November. Local Democratic committee persons selected Caufield to be the nominee for Senate in the special election which he subsequently won. He was reelected to full terms in 1981 and 1983. While in the Senate (and continuing to hold the post of Newark Fire Director), he chaired the State Fire Safety Commission and introduced legislation in 1983 for a uniform statewide fire code.

In July 1986, following the inauguration of Sharpe James as Newark's new mayor, Caufield resigned from the position of Fire Director. He died a few weeks later on August 24 at St. Mary's Hospital in Orange of unknown causes. He was succeeded in the Senate by Ronald Rice.
