= New Jersey's 28th legislative district =

American legislative district

- Senator: Renee Burgess (D)
- Assembly members: Cleopatra Tucker (D); Chigozie Onyema (D)
- Registration: 53.2% Democratic; 8.4% Republican; 37.3% unaffiliated
- Demographics: 21.2% White; 53.9% Black/African American; 0.5% Native American; 4.3% Asian; 0.0% Hawaiian/Pacific Islander; 11.2% Other race; 8.9% Two or more races; 20.2% Hispanic
- Population: 252,742
- Voting-age population: 191,494
- Registered voters: 162,994

New Jersey's 28th legislative district is one of 40 in the New Jersey Legislature. The district includes the Essex County municipalities of Maplewood, Irvington and South Orange, along with portions of Newark (which is also part of the 29th district); and the Union County municipality of Hillside.

== Demographic characteristics ==
As of the 2020 United States census, the district had a population of 252,742, of whom 191,494 (75.8%) were of voting age. The racial makeup of the district was 53,547 (21.2%) White, 136,126 (53.9%) African American, 1,242 (0.5%) Native American, 10,794 (4.3%) Asian, 96 (0.0%) Pacific Islander, 28,388 (11.2%) from some other race, and 22,549 (8.9%) from two or more races. Hispanic or Latino of any race were 51,058 (20.2%) of the population.

The district had 162,994 registered voters as of December 1, 2021, of whom 60,781 (37.3%) were registered as unaffiliated, 86,702 (53.2%) were registered as Democrats, 13,745 (8.4%) were registered as Republicans, and 1,766 (1.1%) were registered to other parties.

== Political representation ==
For the 2026–2027 session, the 28th legislative district of the New Jersey Legislature is represented in the State Senate by Renee Burgess (D, Irvington) and in the General Assembly by Chigozie Onyema (D, Newark) and Cleopatra Tucker (D, Newark).

The legislative district overlaps with 10th and 11th congressional districts.

== Apportionment history ==
Since the creation of the 28th district in 1973 with the first drawing of the 40-district legislative map, the district has always included Irvington and a portion of western Newark. In the 1973 through 1981 version of the district, South Orange was also included in the district. In the 1981 redistricting, it only consisted of Irvington and most of Newark's North Ward. Following the 1991 redistricting, the 28th expanded to South Orange again and Maplewood for the first time. In the 2001 redistricting, the district stretched from Irvington, to a narrow strip of Newark, and into Belleville and Bloomfield. After the 2011 redistricting, Belleville moved to the 29th district while the 28th picked up Glen Ridge and Nutley. As a result of this redistricting, long-time Belleville resident and incumbent Assemblyman Ralph R. Caputo moved to Nutley to run for re-election.

In the 1970s, there was a high turnover rate among the district's legislators. The first pair of Assemblymen only served one term; Philip Keegan who would later become the head of the State Democratic Party retired in 1975 while the incumbent Rocco Neri was defeated by Peter Shapiro who was ultimately elected in the general election and became the state's youngest ever legislator at the age of 23. The County Organization candidate that did win in 1975, Patrick Scanlon, died on June 11, 1977, and was replaced on the general election ballot by his wife, Mary. In the November 1977 special election to complete the remainder of Scanlon's term, a Seton Hall graduate student named Joseph Papasidero won to serve for two months in the Assembly. 1979 brought more changes to the district's delegation. Shapiro resigned in January to become Essex County's first Executive while Senator Martin L. Greenberg resigned in August for personal reasons. Newark Fire Chief John P. Caufield won the November 1979 special election for Greenberg's Senate seat while Remay Pearce won to serve for the remainder of Shapiro's Assembly term making her the first African American woman elected to the Assembly from the district.

Through the 1980s, the district's delegation remained relatively stable with Michael F. Adubato, brother of Newark power broker Steve Adubato Sr., and James Zangari serving in the Assembly from the 28th throughout the entire decade. Caufield died of cancer on August 24, 1986, and was replaced in the Senate by Newark councilman Ronald Rice who still serves in the Senate from this district today.

Major shifts would occur in the district's representatives in the 2000s decade. Donald Kofi Tucker died on October 17, 2005, weeks before the 2005 general election in which he was a candidate. Tucker won the election posthumously which meant the Essex County Democratic Committee members would choose a person to serve the remainder of Tucker's unexpired term and a temporary replacement for the 2006 session. Former Newark School Board President Evelyn Williams was chosen in a vote over Essex County Freeholder and former Republican Assemblyman Ralph R. Caputo to serve in the unexpired term. However, soon after she was sworn into the Assembly in December, Williams was arrested on shoplifting charges. Williams would step down shortly before the end of the session of the legislature leaving one seat vacant again. Librarian and Newark South Ward Democratic activist Oadline Truitt was chosen by the committee to serve until a November 2006 special election that she also won. Truitt and incumbent Assemblyman Craig A. Stanley were defeated in the 2007 Democratic primary by the Cory Booker-backed ticket of Caputo and Cleopatra Tucker, widow of Donald Tucker.

The district, due to its urban core, leans very heavily to the Democratic Party having only elected Democrats to the state legislature. The 28th is one of the few districts statewide to have only elected members of one party to the legislature. The closest races for the legislature in this district are as a result of independent politicians receiving a large share of the vote in some elections. For example, the lowest winning percentages for the Democratic candidates occurred in 1979 when Harry A. McEnroe and Zangari won 29.92% and 27.98% of the total vote respectively (57.9% total), while the two Republican candidates combined had 27.3% of the vote. Three independent candidates received 14.8% of the vote, 7.6% of which were for incumbent Assemblywoman Mary Scanlon who ran as an independent when she lost the party committee's backing in the primary election.

== Election history ==
Senators and Assembly members elected from the district are as follows:

Session	Senate	General Assembly	
1974–1975	Martin L. Greenberg (D)	Philip Keegan (D)	Rocco Neri (D)
1976–1977	Martin L. Greenberg (D)	Patrick Scanlon (D) (Note: Died June 11, 1977)	Peter Shapiro (D)
1976–1977	Martin L. Greenberg (D)	Joseph Papasidero (D) (Note: Elected to the Assembly in November 1977 special election, sworn in on November 21, 1977)	Peter Shapiro (D)
1978–1979	Martin L. Greenberg (D) (Note: Resigned August 16, 1979)	Mary Scanlon (D)	Peter Shapiro (D) (Note: Resigned January 9, 1979, to become Essex County Executive)
1978–1979	John P. Caufield (D) (Note: Elected to the Senate in November 1979 special election, sworn in on November 13, 1979)	Mary Scanlon (D)	Remay Pearce (D) (Note: Elected to the Assembly in November 1979 special election, sworn in on November 19, 1979)
1980–1981	John P. Caufield (D)	Harry A. McEnroe (D)	James Zangari (D)
1982–1983	John P. Caufield (D)	Michael F. Adubato (D)	James Zangari (D)
1984–1985	John P. Caufield (D) (Note: Died August 24, 1986)	Michael F. Adubato (D)	James Zangari (D)
1986–1987	John P. Caufield (D)	Michael F. Adubato (D)	James Zangari (D)
1986–1987	Ronald Rice (D) (Note: Elected to the Senate on November 18, 1986, special election, sworn in on December 4, 1986)	Michael F. Adubato (D)	James Zangari (D)
1988–1989	Ronald Rice (D)	Michael F. Adubato (D)	James Zangari (D)
1990–1991	Ronald Rice (D)	Michael F. Adubato (D)	James Zangari (D)
1992–1993	Ronald Rice (D)	Harry A. McEnroe (D)	James Zangari (D)
1994–1995	Ronald Rice (D)	Harry A. McEnroe (D)	James Zangari (D)
1996–1997	Ronald Rice (D)	Craig A. Stanley (D)	Wilfredo Caraballo (D)
1998–1999	Ronald Rice (D)	Craig A. Stanley (D)	Wilfredo Caraballo (D)
2000–2001	Ronald Rice (D)	Craig A. Stanley (D)	Wilfredo Caraballo (D)
2002–2003	Ronald Rice (D)	Craig A. Stanley (D)	Donald Kofi Tucker (D)
2004–2005	Ronald Rice (D)	Craig A. Stanley (D)	Donald Kofi Tucker (D) (Note: Died October 17, 2005)
2004–2005	Ronald Rice (D)	Craig A. Stanley (D)	Evelyn Williams (D) (Note: Appointed to the Assembly on December 12, 2005, resigned on January 9, 2006)
2006–2007	Ronald Rice (D)	Craig A. Stanley (D)	Oadline Truitt (D) (Note: Appointed to the Assembly on February 9, 2006, elected to complete the term in November 2006 special election)
2008–2009	Ronald Rice (D)	Ralph R. Caputo (D)	Cleopatra Tucker (D)
2010–2011	Ronald Rice (D)	Ralph R. Caputo (D)	Cleopatra Tucker (D)
2012–2013	Ronald Rice (D)	Ralph R. Caputo (D)	Cleopatra Tucker (D)
2014–2015	Ronald Rice (D)	Ralph R. Caputo (D)	Cleopatra Tucker (D)
2016–2017	Ronald Rice (D)	Ralph R. Caputo (D)	Cleopatra Tucker (D)
2018–2019	Ronald Rice (D)	Ralph R. Caputo (D)	Cleopatra Tucker (D)
2020–2021	Ronald Rice (D)	Ralph R. Caputo (D)	Cleopatra Tucker (D)
2022–2023	Ronald Rice (D) (Note: Resigned August 31, 2022 for health reasons)	Ralph R. Caputo (D) (Note: Resigned March 22, 2023 to become a member of the board of Horizon Blue Cross Blue Shield of New Jersey)	Cleopatra Tucker (D)
2022–2023	Renee Burgess (D) (Note: Appointed to the Senate on September 29, 2022)	Jackie Yustein (D) (Note: Appointed to the Assembly on May 25, 2023)	Cleopatra Tucker (D)
2024–2025	Renee Burgess (D)	Garnet Hall (D)	Cleopatra Tucker (D)
2026–2027	Renee Burgess (D)	Chigozie Onyema (D)	Cleopatra Tucker (D)

== Election results ==
=== Senate ===
2021 New Jersey general election
Party	Candidate	Votes	%	±%
Democratic	Ronald L. Rice	33,104	77.9	▼18.2
Republican	Frank Contella	9,383	22.1	N/A
Total votes		42,487	100.0	

New Jersey general election, 2017
Party	Candidate	Votes	%	±%
Democratic	Ronald L. Rice	31,774	96.1	▲20.4
Green	Troy Knight-Napper	1,306	3.9	N/A
Total votes		33,080	100.0	

New Jersey general election, 2013
Party	Candidate	Votes	%	±%
Democratic	Ronald L. Rice	27,265	75.7	▼0.9
Republican	Frank Contella	8,744	24.3	▲0.9
Total votes		36,009	100.0	

2011 New Jersey general election
Party	Candidate	Votes	%
Democratic	Ronald L. Rice	14,781	76.6
Republican	Russell Mollica	4,519	23.4
Total votes		19,300	100.0

2007 New Jersey general election
Party	Candidate	Votes	%	±%
Democratic	Ronald L. Rice	12,821	77.0	▲3.6
Republican	Herbert Glenn	3,838	23.0	▲0.1
Total votes		16,659	100.0	

2003 New Jersey general election
Party	Candidate	Votes	%	±%
Democratic	Ronald L. Rice	10,068	73.4	▲4.0
Republican	Jean LaMothe	3,137	22.9	▼6.7
Green	Beresford Jones	518	3.8	N/A
Total votes		13,723	100.0	

2001 New Jersey general election
Party	Candidate	Votes	%
Democratic	Ronald L. Rice	27,294	69.4
Republican	Marion Crecco	11,646	29.6
Independent	Brian E. Coleman	403	1.0
Total votes		39,343	100.0

1997 New Jersey general election
Party	Candidate	Votes	%	±%
Democratic	Ronald L. Rice	31,069	100.0	0.0
Total votes		31,069	100.0	

1993 New Jersey general election
Party	Candidate	Votes	%	±%
Democratic	Ronald L. Rice	25,107	100.0	▲32.8
Total votes		25,107	100.0	

1991 New Jersey general election
Party	Candidate	Votes	%
Democratic	Ronald L. Rice	15,456	67.2
Republican	Brenda Jean-Pierre	6,876	29.9
Socialist Workers	Rachel H. Knapik	666	2.9
Total votes		22,998	100.0

1987 New Jersey general election
Party	Candidate	Votes	%	±%
Democratic	Ronald L. Rice	10,327	77.3	▲3.2
Republican	Michael J. Volk	3,040	22.7	▲11.5
Total votes		13,367	100.0	

Special election, November 18, 1986
Party	Candidate	Votes	%	±%
Democratic	Ronald L. Rice	4,772	74.1	▲1.2
For the People	Anthony F. Montanelli	944	14.7	N/A
Republican	Frederick Douglas Randolph, Jr.	724	11.2	▼15.9
Total votes		6,440	100.0	

1983 New Jersey general election
Party	Candidate	Votes	%	±%
Democratic	John P. Caufield	11,829	72.9	▼2.1
Republican	Joseph N. Mastrangelo	4,392	27.1	▲2.1
Total votes		16,221	100.0	

1981 New Jersey general election
Party	Candidate	Votes	%
Democratic	John P. Caufield	20,786	75.0
Republican	Herta B. Tully	6,913	25.0
Total votes		27,699	100.0

Special election, November 6, 1979
Party	Candidate	Votes	%	±%
Democratic	John P. Caufield	10,974	57.6	▼0.2
Republican	Walter R. Cohn	4,759	25.0	▼13.8
Uncommitted and Unbossed	Michael P. Bottone	3,333	17.5	N/A
Total votes		19,066	100.0	

1977 New Jersey general election
Party	Candidate	Votes	%	±%
Democratic	Martin L. Greenberg	16,986	57.8	▼2.5
Republican	James A. Pindar	11,399	38.8	▲2.0
Income Tax Referendum	Nicholas T. Fernicola	770	2.6	N/A
Jobs, Equality, Peace	Charles E. Cascone	234	0.8	N/A
Total votes		29,389	100.0	

1973 New Jersey general election
Party	Candidate	Votes	%
Democratic	Martin L. Greenberg	22,290	60.3
Republican	Joseph P. Galluzzi	13,601	36.8
American	Chris Marciano	1,070	2.9
Total votes		36,961	100.0

=== General Assembly ===
2021 New Jersey general election
Party	Candidate	Votes	%	±%
Democratic	Ralph R. Caputo	32,797	39.2	▼2.2
Democratic	Cleopatra G. Tucker	32,719	39.1	▼1.7
Republican	Monique Headen	9,063	10.8	▲2.4
Republican	Anthony D'Angelo	9,005	10.8	▲3.1
Total votes		83,584	100.0	

2019 New Jersey general election
Party	Candidate	Votes	%	±%
Democratic	Ralph R. Caputo	16,234	41.4	▼1.3
Democratic	Cleopatra Tucker	15,998	40.8	▼1.3
Republican	Joy Bembry-Freeman	3,282	8.4	▲1.5
Republican	Antonio Pires	3,025	7.7	▲1.1
Strength in Numbers	Derrick Ross	627	1.6	N/A
Total votes		39,166	100.0	

New Jersey general election, 2017
Party	Candidate	Votes	%	±%
Democratic	Ralph R. Caputo	30,084	42.7	▼0.5
Democratic	Cleopatra G. Tucker	29,643	42.1	▲0.4
Republican	Veronica Branch	4,839	6.9	▼0.6
Republican	James Boydston	4,672	6.6	▼0.9
Time for Change	Joanne Miller	782	1.1	N/A
A New Hope	Scott Thomas Nicastro Jr.	430	0.6	N/A
Total votes		70,450	100.0	

New Jersey general election, 2015
Party	Candidate	Votes	%	±%
Democratic	Ralph R. Caputo	9,512	43.2	▲4.3
Democratic	Cleopatra G. Tucker	9,186	41.7	▲3.3
Republican	David H. Pinckney	1,661	7.5	▼4.2
Republican	Darnel C. Henry	1,646	7.5	▼3.6
Total votes		22,005	100.0	

New Jersey general election, 2013
Party	Candidate	Votes	%	±%
Democratic	Ralph Caputo	26,221	38.9	▲1.3
Democratic	Cleopatra G. Tucker	25,869	38.4	▲0.2
Republican	Peter S. Manning	7,875	11.7	▼0.9
Republican	James Boydston	7,452	11.1	▼0.5
Total votes		67,417	100.0	

New Jersey general election, 2011
Party	Candidate	Votes	%
Democratic	Cleopatra G. Tucker	14,002	38.2
Democratic	Ralph R. Caputo	13,786	37.6
Republican	Carol Humphreys	4,607	12.6
Republican	David H. Pinckney	4,258	11.6
Total votes		36,653	100.0

New Jersey general election, 2009
Party	Candidate	Votes	%	±%
Democratic	Cleopatra G. Tucker	25,975	40.8	▲3.2
Democratic	Ralph R. Caputo	25,172	39.5	▲0.7
Republican	Herbert Glenn	6,477	10.2	▼2.1
Republican	Andrew Bloschak	6,053	9.5	▼1.8
Total votes		63,677	100.0	

New Jersey general election, 2007
Party	Candidate	Votes	%	±%
Democratic	Ralph R. Caputo	12,264	38.8	▼0.8
Democratic	Cleopatra G. Tucker	11,891	37.6	▼1.8
Republican	Michael V. Lewis	3,898	12.3	▲2.1
Republican	Andrew M. Bloschak	3,561	11.3	▲1.3
Total votes		31,614	100.0	

Special election, November 7, 2006
Party	Candidate	Votes	%
Democratic	Oadline Truitt	25,265	93.9
One for All	Joanne Maiorca	1,645	6.1
Total votes		26,910	100.0

New Jersey general election, 2005
Party	Candidate	Votes	%	±%
Democratic	Donald Tucker	27,030	39.6	▲2.2
Democratic	Craig A. Stanley	26,890	39.4	▲3.2
Republican	Ana Pizutelli	6,928	10.2	▼2.8
Republican	Barbara Dennis	6,820	10.0	▼3.4
Socialist Workers	Michael Ortega	513	0.8	N/A
Total votes		68,181	100.0	

New Jersey general election, 2003
Party	Candidate	Votes	%	±%
Democratic	Donald Tucker	9,730	37.4	▲0.4
Democratic	Craig A. Stanley	9,415	36.2	▼0.4
Republican	Barbara Dennis	3,480	13.4	▲0.7
Republican	Nicholas F. DeAngelis	3,385	13.0	▲1.0
Total votes		26,010	100.0	

New Jersey general election, 2001
Party	Candidate	Votes	%
Democratic	Donald Tucker	27,949	37.0
Democratic	Craig A. Stanley	27,635	36.6
Republican	Charles Daglian	9,557	12.7
Republican	Michael Melham	9,042	12.0
Conservative	Vincent J. Frantantoni	866	1.1
Independent	William Coleman	474	0.6
Total votes		75,523	100.0

New Jersey general election, 1999
Party	Candidate	Votes	%	±%
Democratic	Craig A. Stanley	9,546	40.0	▲0.4
Democratic	Wilfredo Caraballo	9,278	38.9	▼1.2
Republican	Hillary Dow	2,157	9.0	▼1.9
Republican	Steven Johnson	2,125	8.9	▲0.4
Pro Life Conservative	Jim Riley	389	1.6	N/A
Pro Life Conservative	Dick Hester	370	1.6	▲1.1
Total votes		23,865	100.0	

New Jersey general election, 1997
Party	Candidate	Votes	%	±%
Democratic	Wilfredo Caraballo	28,673	40.1	▲5.0
Democratic	Craig A. Stanley	28,261	39.6	▲5.5
Republican	Mary Devon O’Brien	7,754	10.9	▼1.1
Republican	Eugene Brenycz	6,044	8.5	▼3.6
Conservative	Barbara M. Hester	368	0.5	▼1.0
Conservative	Richard S. Hester, Sr.	335	0.5	▼0.7 (▼1.3)
Total votes		71,435	100.0	

New Jersey general election, 1995
Party	Candidate	Votes	%	±%
Democratic	Wilfredo Caraballo	10,939	35.1	▼3.4
Democratic	Craig A. Stanley	10,613	34.1	▼1.4
Republican	Eugene L. Brenycz	3,756	12.1	0.0
Republican	Charles R. Olszewski	3,743	12.0	▼1.9
Pro-Life Conservative	Mary Ann E. Gaffney	688	2.2	N/A
Pro-Life Conservative	Richard S. Hester, Sr.	553	1.8	N/A
Conservative	Tammy Camastra	459	1.5	N/A
Conservative	Christopher Camastra	377	1.2	N/A
Total votes		31,128	100.0	

New Jersey general election, 1993
Party	Candidate	Votes	%	±%
Democratic	Harry McEnroe	23,128	38.5	▲5.2
Democratic	James Zangari	21,357	35.5	▲3.1
Republican	Phyllis C. Cedola	8,354	13.9	▼1.6
Republican	Eugene L. Brenycz	7,282	12.1	▼3.4
Total votes		60,121	100.0	

1991 New Jersey general election
Party	Candidate	Votes	%
Democratic	Harry McEnroe	14,892	33.3
Democratic	James Zangari	14,470	32.4
Republican	Phyllis C. Cedola	6,933	15.5
Republican	Consiglia Amato-DeMeo	6,903	15.5
Socialist Workers	Al Duncan	762	1.7
Socialist Workers	Marlene Karen Kopperud	694	1.6
Total votes		44,654	100.0

1989 New Jersey general election
Party	Candidate	Votes	%	±%
Democratic	Michael F. Adubato	17,518	41.5	▲4.7
Democratic	James Zangari	16,895	40.0	▲4.4
Republican	Michael J. Grier	3,859	9.1	▼1.6
Republican	Michael Volk	3,699	8.8	▼1.1
Socialist Workers	Ernest M. Mailhot	281	0.7	N/A
Total votes		42,252	100.0	

1987 New Jersey general election
Party	Candidate	Votes	%	±%
Democratic	Michael F. Adubato	9,680	36.8	▲6.4
Democratic	James Zangari	9,375	35.6	▲6.2
Republican	Howard E. Berkeley	2,810	10.7	▼10.2
Republican	William P. Rutan	2,599	9.9	▼9.3
People's Needs First	Lawrence Hamm	1,850	7.0	N/A
Total votes		26,314	100.0	

1985 New Jersey general election
Party	Candidate	Votes	%	±%
Democratic	Michael F. Adubato	12,495	30.4	▼4.1
Democratic	James Zangari	12,092	29.4	▼3.0
Republican	Joe Imperiale	8,604	20.9	▲8.3
Republican	Jose Linares	7,896	19.2	▲8.5
Total votes		41,087	100.0	

New Jersey general election, 1983
Party	Candidate	Votes	%	±%
Democratic	Michael F. Adubato	10,816	34.5	▼3.2
Democratic	Jimmy Zangari	10,171	32.4	▼3.6
Republican	Anthony J. Carpiniello	3,948	12.6	▼1.2
Republican	Michael J. Volk	3,347	10.7	▼1.9
Independent	Frank G. Megaro	3,098	9.9	N/A
Total votes		31,380	100.0	

New Jersey general election, 1981
Party	Candidate	Votes	%
Democratic	Michael F. Adubato	20,171	37.7
Democratic	Jimmy Zangari	19,273	36.0
Republican	Joseph N. Mastrangelo	7,379	13.8
Republican	Alan D. Valdez	6,738	12.6
Total votes		53,561	100.0

New Jersey general election, 1979
Party	Candidate	Votes	%	±%
Democratic	Harry McEnroe	10,679	29.9	▼5.7
Democratic	James Zangari	9,989	28.0	▼3.8
Republican	William Conway	5,284	14.8	▼1.3
Republican	Marian E. Jackson	4,461	12.5	▼3.0
My Experience Counts	Mary M. Scanlon	2,705	7.6	▼24.2
Strengthen Your Government	Anthony De Franco	1,571	4.4	N/A
Law And Order	Charles P. O’Boyle	1,006	2.8	N/A
Total votes		35,695	100.0	

Special election, November 6, 1979
Party	Candidate	Votes	%
Democratic	Remay Pearce	9,684	60.6
Republican	Joseph S. Soriano	6,303	39.4
Total votes		15,987	100.0

New Jersey general election, 1977
Party	Candidate	Votes	%	±%
Democratic	Peter Shapiro	20,659	35.6	▲1.3
Democratic	Mary M. Scanlon	18,470	31.8	▲0.5
Republican	William I. Conway	9,372	16.1	▼0.7
Republican	Oleh Myskiw	8,979	15.5	▲0.5
Independent	Patrick Yorke	618	1.1	N/A
Total votes		58,098	100.0	

Special election, November 8, 1977
Party	Candidate	Votes	%
Democratic	Joseph Papasidero	17,813	66.0
Republican	Larry A. Raymond	9,193	34.0
Total votes		27,006	100.0

New Jersey general election, 1975
Party	Candidate	Votes	%	±%
Democratic	Peter Shapiro	19,257	34.3	▼0.2
Democratic	Patrick J. Scanlon	17,569	31.3	▼2.5
Republican	Paul R. Daniels	9,438	16.8	▲1.6
Republican	Ruth L. Margules	8,408	15.0	▲1.5
Independents in Government	Clementine H. Kasprowicz	628	1.1	N/A
Independents in Government	George R. Schumarty	431	0.8	N/A
Libertarian	William E. Schetlick	346	0.6	N/A
Total votes		56,077	100.0	

New Jersey general election, 1973
Party	Candidate	Votes	%
Democratic	Philip M. Keegan	24,013	34.5
Democratic	Rocco Neri	23,574	33.8
Republican	Joseph T. DeVizio	10,566	15.2
Republican	Charles C. Deubel, Jr.	9,436	13.5
American	Melville T. Bowers	2,076	3.0
Total votes		69,665	100.0
