= Mary Scanlon (New Jersey politician) =

American politician

Mary M. Scanlon

Member of the New Jersey General Assembly from the 28th Legislative District
- In office January 10, 1978 – January 8, 1980
- Preceded by: Joseph Papasidero
- Succeeded by: Harry A. McEnroe and James Zangari

Personal details
- Born: Mary O'Grady; June 26, 1924 Newark, New Jersey
- Died: January 29, 2002 (aged 77)
- Party: Democratic

Mary M. O'Grady Scanlon (June 26, 1924 – January 29, 2002) was an American Democratic Party politician who served in the New Jersey General Assembly from the 28th Legislative District from 1978 to 1980.

Born in Newark, on June 26, 1924, as Mary O'Grady, she attended St. James High School and worked in the office of the Essex County Clerk before she was elected to office in November 1978.

Following the death of her husband, Patrick Scanlon in June 1977, she was selected to fill his spot on the general election ballot, while Joseph Papasidero was chosen to run for the remaining balance of Patrick's term in the Assembly. Scanlon and her running mate Peter Shapiro were elected. After serving a single term, the Democratic Party chose to nominate Harry A. McEnroe and James Zangari for the two Assembly seats in 1979.
