= Garnet Hall =

American politician

Member of the New Jersey General Assembly from the 28th district
- In office January 9, 2024 – January 13, 2026
- Preceded by: Jackie Yustein
- Succeeded by: Chigozie Onyema

Personal details
- Party: Democratic
- Education: Fairleigh Dickinson University
- Website: Legislative webpage

Garnet R. Thornton Hall is an American Democratic Party politician who served as a member of the New Jersey General Assembly for the 28th legislative district from January 9, 2024 to January 13, 2026.

== Biography ==
Born in Montclair, New Jersey, Hall graduated from Montclair High School and attended Fairleigh Dickinson University. A resident of Maplewood, New Jersey, Hall has been a deputy clerk in Essex County.

== New Jersey General Assembly ==
Running together with State Senator Renee Burgess as part of the first slate for the legislature composed entirely of African-American women, Hall and her incumbent running mate Cleopatra Tucker defeated Republicans Joy Freeman and Willie S. Jetti in the 2023 New Jersey General Assembly election. Hall was one of 27 members elected for the first time to serve in the General Assembly, more than one-third of the seats.

=== Committees ===
Committee assignments for the 2024—2025 Legislative Session were:

- Consumer Affairs
- Environment, Natural Resources, and Solid Waste
- Labor

=== District 28 ===
Each of the 40 districts in the New Jersey Legislature has one representative in the New Jersey Senate and two members in the New Jersey General Assembly. The representatives from the 28th District for the 2024—2025 Legislative Session are:

- Senator Renee Burgess (D)
- Assemblyman Garnet Hall (D)
- Assemblyman Cleopatra Tucker (D)

== Electoral history ==
28th Legislative District General Election, 2023
Party	Candidate	Votes	%
Democratic	Cleopatra G. Tucker (incumbent)	19,094	46.3
Democratic	Garnet Hall	18,637	45.2
Republican	Joy Freeman	1,902	4.6
Republican	Willie S. Jetti	1,600	3.9
Total votes		41,233	100.0
Democratic hold			
Democratic hold			
