= Chigozie Onyema =

American politician

Member of the New Jersey General Assembly from the 28th district
- Incumbent
- Assumed office January 13, 2026 Serving with Cleopatra Tucker
- Preceded by: Garnet Hall

Personal details
- Born: 1986 or 1987 (age 39–40) Newark, New Jersey, U.S.
- Party: Democratic
- Education: Essex County College (AA); Howard University (BA); New York University (JD)
- Website: State Assembly website

Chigozie U. Onyema (1985/1986) is an American Democratic Party politician who has represented the 28th Legislative District in the New Jersey General Assembly since taking office in January 2026. He previously served as assistant commissioner of the New Jersey Department of Community Affairs.

== Early life and education ==
Onyema was born in Newark, New Jersey, and grew up in the Hilton neighborhood of Maplewood. His parents immigrated to the United States from Nigeria. After graduating from Columbia High School, he unsuccessfully ran for school board of the South Orange-Maplewood School District in 2005.

Onyema earned his Juris Doctor from the New York University School of Law, Bachelor of Arts in Afro-American Studies from Howard University, and Associate of Arts in Liberal Arts from Essex County College.

== Career ==
Onyema served as the Senior Director for the Sustainable Cities program at PolicyLink. Previously, he served as general counsel for the Newark Parking Authority and as an assistant commissioner of the New Jersey Department of Community Affairs under lieutenant governor Sheila Oliver. He was a member of Ras Baraka’s mayoral transition team in 2014 and on Phil Murphy’s gubernatorial transition team in 2017.

=== 2022 Newark Council campaign ===
In 2022, Onyema ran for the Municipal Council of Newark in the West Ward. His campaign proposed developing a community land trust for affordable housing and improving quality of life. He advanced to the general election against Dupré Kelly, former Lords of the Underground member and an ally of mayor Ras Baraka.

=== New Jersey General Assembly ===
In 2024, Onyema announced he would run for the New Jersey General Assembly in the 28th district in 2025. He and incumbent Cleopatra Tucker won the co-endorsements of the Essex County and Union County Democratic Committees; incumbent Garnet Hall initially earned the Union County endorsement but lost it for supporting Steve Fulop in the 2025 New Jersey gubernatorial election. He was the first candidate to be endorsed by the New Jersey Working Families Party leading up to the statewide primary election. He placed second in the Democratic primary election, advancing to the general election alongside Tucker and defeating Hall for re-nomination.

== Electoral history ==
=== 2025 ===
2025 New Jersey General Assembly Democratic primary election, 28th district
Party	Candidate	Votes	%
Democratic	Cleopatra Tucker (incumbent)	14,109	38.65%
Democratic	Chigozie Onyema	13,456	36.86%
Democratic	Garnet Hall (incumbent)	8,937	24.48%
Total votes		36,502	100.00%

2025 New Jersey General Assembly general election, 28th district
Party	Candidate	Votes	%
Democratic	Cleopatra Tucker (incumbent)	47,998	50.39%
Democratic	Chigozie Onyema	47,263	49.61%
Total votes		95,261	100%
Democratic hold			
Democratic hold			

=== 2022 ===
2022 Newark West Ward election
Primary election
Candidate	Votes	%
Dupre L. Kelly	1,489	37.99%
Chigozie U. Onyema	1,137	29.01%
Oscar S. James II	510	13.01%
Lavita E. Johnson	380	9.70%
Lyndon Brown	313	7.99%
Michelle Lyn Middleton	90	2.30%
Total votes	3,919	100.00
General election
Dupre L. Kelly	1,973	58.65%
Chigozie U. Onyema	1,391	41.35%
Total votes	3,364	100%
