= Renee Burgess =

Member of the New Jersey General Assembly

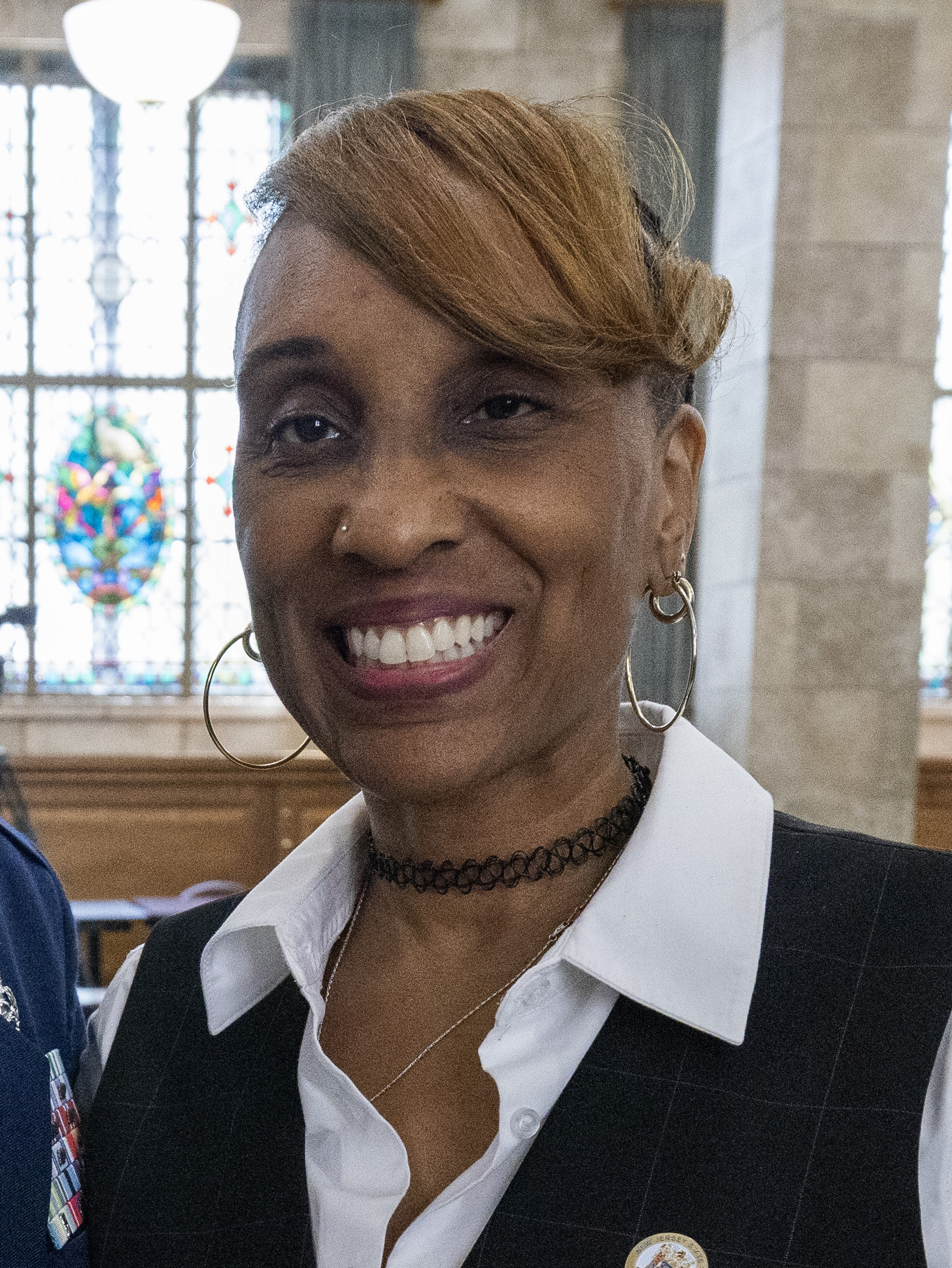

Member of the New Jersey Senate from the 28th district
- Incumbent
- Assumed office September 29, 2022
- Preceded by: Ronald Rice

Personal details
- Born: April 5, 1971 (age 55)
- Party: Democratic
- Education: Essex County College (AS); Pillar College (BA); Metropolitan College of New York (MPA)
- Occupation: Politician
- Website: Legislative webpage

Renee C. Burgess (born April 5, 1971) is an American politician serving as a member of the New Jersey Senate representing the 28th district. A Democrat, she was selected for the seat in 2022 following Ronald Rice's resignation due to health issues.

A resident of Irvington, Burgess had served on the board of education of the Irvington Public Schools from 2002 to 2014, serving board vice president from 2005 to 2007 and as board president from 2007 to 2009. She served on the Irvington township council from 2014 to 2022 and was the council president from 2019 to 2022.

== New Jersey Senate ==
In September 2022, after the retirement of Ronald Rice, Burgess was appointed to the Senate by a special convention of Essex County Democrats. Burgess is the first State Senator from Irvington.

=== Committees ===
Committee assignments for the 2024—2025 Legislative Session are:

- Budget and Appropriations
- Community and Urban Affairs
- Health, Human Services and Senior Citizens

=== District 28 ===
Each of the 40 districts in the New Jersey Legislature has one representative in the New Jersey Senate and two members in the New Jersey General Assembly. The representatives from the 28th District for the 2024—2025 Legislative Session are:

- Senator Renee Burgess (D)
- Assemblyman Garnet Hall (D)
- Assemblyman Cleopatra Tucker (D)

== Electoral history ==
28th Legislative District General Election, 2023
| Party | Candidate | Votes | % |
|---|---|---|---|
| Democratic | Renee C. Burgess (incumbent) | 19,638 | 100.0 |
| Total votes | | 19,638 | 100.0 |
| Democratic hold | | | |

28th Legislative District special Election, 2022
| Party | Candidate | Votes | % |
|---|---|---|---|
| Democratic | Renee C. Burgess (incumbent) | 32,450 | 78.1 |
| Republican | Joy Freeman | 9,116 | 21.9 |
| Total votes | | 41,566 | 100.0 |
| Democratic hold | | | |
