= Dual mandate =

Serving in multiple public positions simultaneously

A dual mandate occurs when an official serves in or holds multiple public positions simultaneously. This practice is sometimes known as double jobbing in Britain, double-dipping in the United States, and cumul des mandats in France. Thus, if someone who is already mayor of a town or city councillor becomes elected as MP or senator at the national or state legislature and retains both positions, this is a dual mandate.

Political and legal approaches toward dual mandate-holding vary widely. In some countries, dual mandates are a well-established part of the political culture; in others they may be prohibited by law. For example, in federal states, federal office holders are often not permitted to hold state office. In most states, membership of an independent judiciary or civil service generally disqualifies a person from simultaneously holding office in the executive or the legislature. In states with a presidential or dualist parliamentary system of government, members of the executive cannot simultaneously be members of the legislature and vice versa. In states with bicameral legislatures, one usually cannot simultaneously be a member of both houses. The holder of one office who wins election or appointment to another where a dual mandate is prohibited must either resign the former office or refuse the new one.

== European Parliament ==
A member of the European Parliament (MEP) may not be a member of the national legislature of a member state. This dates from a 2002 European Union decision, which came into effect at the 2004 European elections in most member states, at the 2007 national election in the Republic of Ireland, and at the 2009 European elections in the United Kingdom.

Originally, MEPs were nominated by national parliamentarians from among their own membership. Prior to the first direct elections in 1979, the dual mandate was discussed. Some advocated banning it, arguing that MEPs who were national MPs were often absent from one assembly in order to attend the other (indeed, the early death of Peter Michael Kirk was blamed by his election agent on overwork resulting from his dual mandate). Others claimed that members with a dual mandate enhanced communication between national and European assemblies. There was a particular interest in the dual mandate question in Denmark: Eurosceptic Danish Social Democrats supported a compulsory dual mandate, to ensure that the state's MEPs expressed the same views as the national legislature, and the government of Denmark supported a compulsory dual mandate when the other eight member states supported an optional dual mandate. However, a 1976 European Parliament law preparing for the 1979 elections expressly permitted a dual mandate. In 1978 the German politician Willy Brandt suggested that one third of MEPs should be national MPs.

== Australia ==
Dual mandates are rare in Australia. It is not permitted to be a member of any state parliament and the Australian Parliament simultaneously. A member of a state parliament seeking federal office must resign before seeking election to the Federal Parliament. It is possible but unusual to be a member of a local government and another parliament. A recent example is Dr Kerryn Phelps who maintained her position as a Councillor on the City of Sydney Council while sitting in Federal Parliament as the Member for Wentworth between 2018 and 2019.

Ben Chifley, prime minister from 1945 to 1949, was a long-serving member of the Abercrombie Shire Council in regional New South Wales. He continued to attend council meetings after his appointment as prime minister. However, he was defeated in his bid for re-election in 1947, receiving 220 votes on a turnout of less than 900 voters.

In 2004 Clover Moore became the independent member for Sydney in the NSW Parliament without resigning as Lord Mayor of Sydney. The issue of Moore holding both positions had brought the issue to the forefront in Australia and led the premier of New South Wales in 2012 to propose a new law, dubbed in the media as the "Get Clover bill", which banned this dual mandate. The proposed law was adopted and in September 2012 Moore resigned her state seat soon after she was reelected as mayor.

== Belgium ==
As in neighboring France, the culture of dual mandates is very strong in Belgium and that country currently has one of the highest percentage of dual mandate holders (MPs, aldermen, municipal councilors) in the world. During the 2003–2009 period, 87.3% of members of the Walloon (French-speaking) Parliament held dual mandates, followed by 86.5% in the Flemish (Dutch-speaking) Parliament, 82.0% in the Chamber of Representatives (the Federal lower house) and 68.9% in the Senate. During that same period, 76.5% of all European Parliament MPs from Belgium held dual mandates.

More than one-fifth of all Belgian MPs were mayor at the same time with, by far, by the highest proportion (40%) to be found in the Walloon Parliament.

== Canada ==
In Canada dual mandates are rare and are frequently barred by legislation at the federal, provincial, or territorial level. At the federal level, section 39 of the Constitution Act, 1867 prevents a Senator from being elected as a Member of Parliament; similarly, s. 65(c) of the Canada Elections Act makes members of provincial or territorial legislatures ineligible to be candidates to the House of Commons. At the provincial level, the situation varies from one province to another.

In most circumstances, an elected official almost always resigns their first post when elected to another. Dual representation has occurred occasionally when the member was elected to a second office shortly before their other term of office was due to expire anyway and whereby the short time frame would not merit the cost of a special by-election. In 1996, for example, Jenny Kwan continued to be a Vancouver city councillor after being elected to the provincial legislature. The British Columbia legislature had debated a "Dual Elected Office Prohibition Act" which failed to pass second reading. In 2024, Misty Van Popta continued serving as a Langley Township city council member after being elected an MLA for Langley-Walnut Grove and in 2025 Chak Au, stayed on as a Richmond City Councillor after being elected an Member of Parliament for Richmond Centre—Marpole stating that he didn't want to trigger a by-election that cost money and that he would still participate in City Council meetings and donate his salary to charities.

In the first few years after Confederation in 1867, however, double mandates were common. In the first House of Commons, there were fifteen Members of Parliament from Quebec who simultaneously held seats in the Legislative Assembly of Quebec, including the Premier Pierre-Joseph-Olivier Chauveau. There were also four members of Parliament from Ontario who also held seats in the Legislative Assembly of Ontario, including the first two Premiers, John Sandfield Macdonald and Edward Blake. Other prominent federal politicians with double mandates included George-Étienne Cartier, Christopher Dunkin, Hector Langevin, the second Premier of British Columbia, Amor de Cosmos, and two members from Manitoba, Donald Smith and Pierre Delorme. Another famous example is that of the de facto leader of the Liberals, George Brown, who ran for both federal and provincial seats in 1867. Brown lost both elections, and soon thereafter began campaigning for the prohibition of double mandates.

The double mandate was prohibited from the start in Nova Scotia and New Brunswick; it was abolished in Ontario in 1872, in Manitoba in 1873, and in 1873 the federal parliament passed a law against it; Quebec passed its own law abolishing it in 1874.

However, dual mandates within a province remained legal. From 1867 to 1985, 305 mayors were also members of the Quebec legislative assembly (MLA). The two best-known cases were those of S.N. Parent who was simultaneously mayor of Quebec City (1894–1906), MLA and Premier of Quebec (1900–1905). Longtime Montreal Mayor Camilien Houde (1928–32, 1938–40) was also simultaneously MLA for a total of 2 ½ years during his mandates as mayor. However, that type of dual mandate had virtually ceased when laws adopted in 1978 and 1980 prohibited MNAs from holding any local mandate.

== Finland ==
It is common for members of the Finnish Parliament to hold a mandate as a member of their local municipal council as well. 79 percent of MPs elected to parliament in 2011 were also municipal council members.

== France ==
The cumul des mandats (French: [kymyl dɛ mɑ̃da], lit. accumulation of mandates) is a common practice in the Fifth French Republic (1958–present). It consists of simultaneously holding two or more elective offices at different levels of government — local, regional, national and European — as mayors, MPs, senators, Members of the European Parliament, and President of the General Council in their home regions. Sometimes, officials hold as many as four positions. While officials may not be elected to more than one office at the same level (such as being both an MP and a senator), they may hold offices in any combination at the municipal, departmental, regional, national and European levels. The cumul des mandats is controversial in France, being accused of fostering absenteeism and cronyism.

Several laws to limit the practice have been introduced in recent decades. By far the most coveted local mandate is that of mayor, traditionally a highly prestigious function in France.

A hotly debated law to prohibit all dual mandates, to take effect in 2017, was adopted in July 2013. Following the adoption of the law, former President Sarkozy and other members of the opposition UMP party have declared that if elected in 2017, their party would revise or even revoke that law. Many Socialist Party MPs and senators have also expressed their unease with the law imposed by President Hollande and might welcome a review of the law. In the meantime, the ubiquitous 'député-maire' (MP and mayor) and 'sénateur-maire' are still familiar figures of the French political scene.

=== Conditions regarding multiple mandates in France ===
The President of France cannot hold any other office during their tenure, except for the position of co-prince of Andorra, which they hold ex officio with the Bishop of Urgell. In practice, each send a personal representative, the equivalent of a viceroy, to Andorra to act on their behalf.

Multiple mandates at the legislative level

Parliamentary mandates are incompatible with each other:

- Member of the National Assembly of France
- Member of the Senate of France
- Member of the European Parliament

The 2022 election in Pas-de-Calais's 8th Assembly constituency was annulled because the winner's substitute was already substitute for a senator.

A member from one of the above assemblies cannot combine its mandate with more than one of the following mandates:

- Member, vice-president or president of a Departmental Council
- Member, vice-president or president of a Regional Council
- Councillor, deputy-mayor, or mayor of a commune of more than 3,500 inhabitants
- Councillor of Paris (The "Council of Paris" is at the same level a municipal council and a departmental council, because Paris has a special status, municipality and département at the same level)
- Councillor in the Corsican Assembly (Corse has a regional special status)

Exceptions: They can hold a third office in a town of less than 3,500 inhabitants.

They may also hold a third office as a councillor, vice-president or president of an urban community, an agglomeration community or a communauté de communes, as these terms are elected by indirect universal suffrage, by municipal councils from among the councillors.

For example, a member of the National Assembly has the right to be general/regional councillor or President of a regional/general council. They cannot hold a third office unless they are the mayor, deputy mayor or municipal councillor of a city of less than 3,500 inhabitants.

In 2008, 85% of members of parliament held multiple posts Following the June 2012 legislative elections, it was still the case that 75% of all National Assembly members (438 deputies out of 577) held a double mandate (often as mayor of a mid- to large-size city) and 33 have four mandates. In August 2013, out of 348 senators, 152 are also mayors.

Accumulation of local mandates

They cannot have more than two local mandates.

The following mandates are incompatible each other:

- Mayor
- President of the General Council
- President of the Regional Council

For example, an elected official cannot be mayor and president of the Regional Council. However, all other local mandates are cumulative. A mayor can also be a general councillor and a president of a Regional Council can also be deputy-mayor of a city.

Exceptions are the same as those for parliamentarians (Cities of less than 3,500 inhabitants and the intercommunalities)

Accumulation of mandates and governmental functions

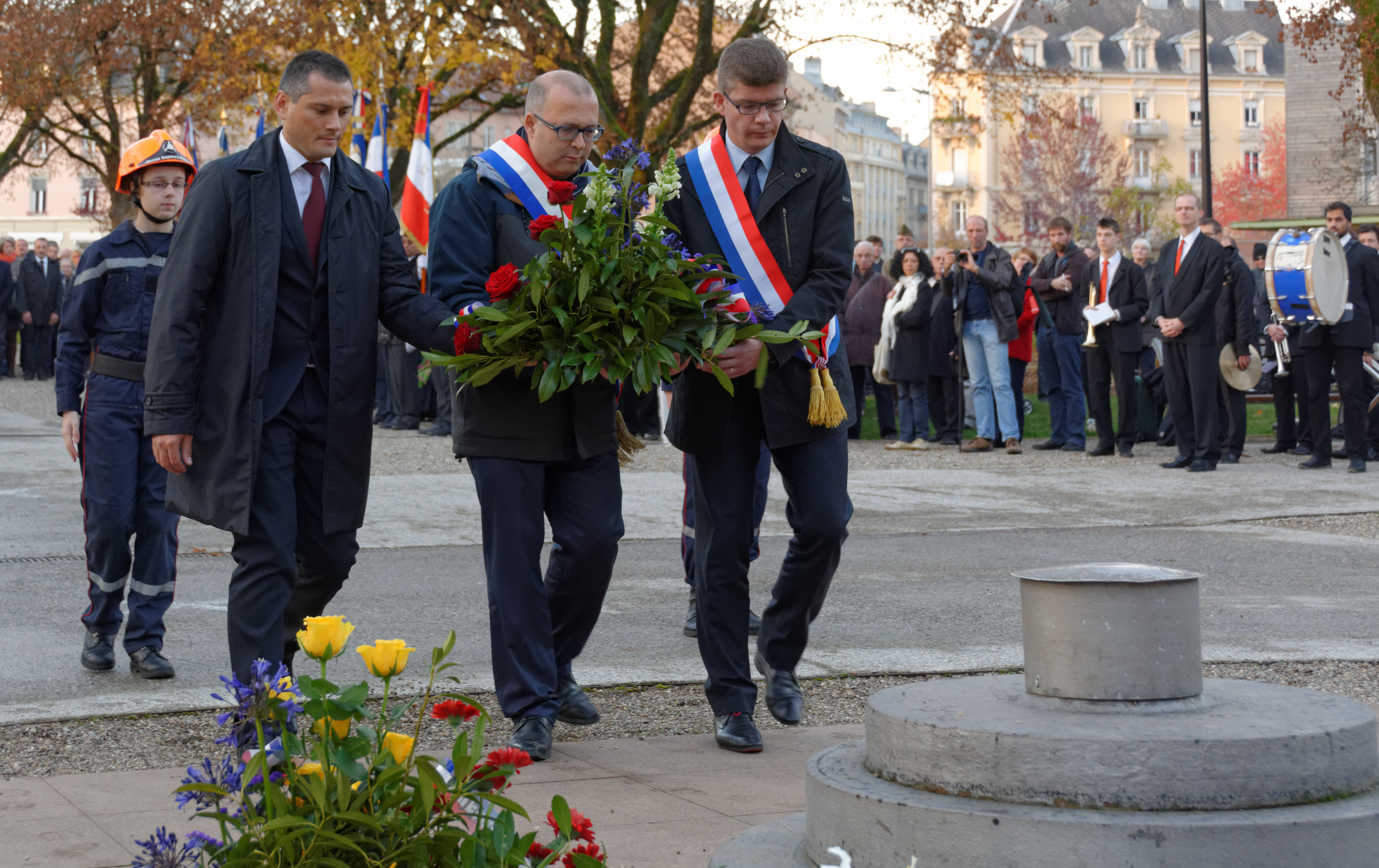
The MP-mayor of Belfort and the Cédric Perrin senator-mayor of Beaucourt at a ceremony in 2014

A member of the French government cannot be a member of any assembly. However, the member of government may retain any local mandate they hold. A cabinet minister can exercise a maximum of two local mandates in addition to their government function.

For example, the prime minister, a minister or secretary of state can be mayor, or president of a general, regional or intercommunal council or sit in one of these assemblies.

Currently, over two-thirds of the members of the French government are engaged in one or two more local mandates.

=== Purpose and frequency ===
The rationales for holding multiple offices are varied. Holding a seat in the Senate, National Assembly, or European Parliament gives local mayors a valuable method of tapping funds to develop their home cities and regions. It also can give opportunities to curry favor with other important officials, with opportunities at each level. Salaries for positions can be combined (to a point) as well. For politicians with national ambitions, retaining a position in a local town can give them a down-to-earth aura that can appeal to voters. These advantages have made politicians very wary of reducing the practice of the cumul with legislation despite other moves to end perceptions of favoritism and corruption among politicians.

It has been common practice in France since the Third Republic (1870). But there are also many cases of "cumul" before this period, for example, the writer Alexis de Tocqueville was a member from 1839 to 1851. In 1849 he was appointed Minister of Foreign Affairs and at the same time he was elected President of the General Council of Manche from 1849 to 1851 (councillor from 1842 to 1852).

There are several reasons for this phenomenon, and one of them is that France has a long tradition of centralization, compared to countries such as Germany, Italy, and Spain. Local governments have fewer powers and resources than those possessed by the Länder of Germany, or Autonomous Communities of Spain. The local mandates in France are less important than in other countries, and therefore politicians have more time to devote to a parliamentary mandate.

The cumul is a widespread practice and has grown much more prevalent in modern France. In 1946, 36 percent of deputies in the National Assembly held an additional office. By 1956, this number had already increased to 42 percent and by 1970, 70 percent of deputies held an additional elected office; in 1988, 96 percent did.

Many of the most prominent politicians in France make use or have made use of the cumul. Jacques Chirac served as Mayor of Paris between 1977 and 1995. During this same time, Chirac also served as a deputy in the National Assembly from Corrèze, briefly as Member of the European Parliament, and even as Prime Minister between 1986 and 1988. Former Prime Minister Pierre Bérégovoy served concurrently as mayor of Nevers and deputy of Nièvre in the mid-1980s.

==== An example: the accumulation of four electoral mandates ====
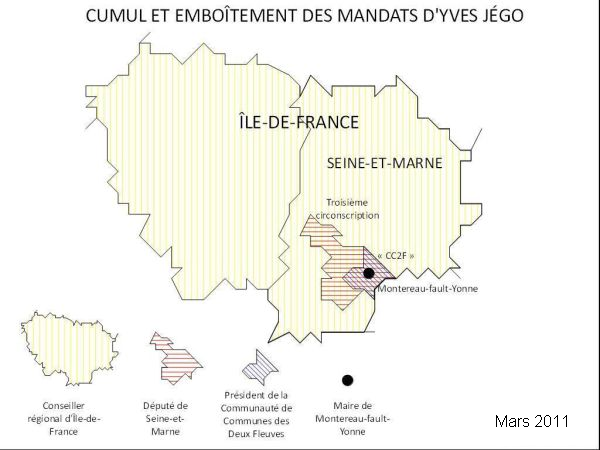
Yves Jégo's four mandates, between March 2010 and July 2011.

According to French law against accumulation of electoral mandates, Yves Jégo should have resigned from one of the following mandates before 21 April 2010 (one month after the Regional elections):

- Member of the National Assembly of France for Seine-et-Marne
- Regional councillor of Île-de-France
- Mayor of Montereau-Fault-Yonne

But giving as a pretext a legal complaint from the Front National's candidates, he held the three of them for more than a year, plus his local mandate of president of the communauté de communes des deux fleuves (CC2F).

=== Recent and current status of cumul in the French government ===
Lionel Jospin (Prime Minister from 1997 to 2002) imposed on his government ministers an unwritten rule of having no local office. For example, Catherine Trautmann stepped down as Mayor of Strasbourg (while remaining a member of the city council) to become Minister of Culture; conversely, Martine Aubry stepped down from the Ministry of Labour when elected Mayor of Lille in 2001. This rule was more or less upheld by Jacques Chirac during the governments of Jean-Pierre Raffarin and Dominique de Villepin for the 2002–2007 term, with a few notable exceptions (Jean-François Copé was mayor of Meaux, Nicolas Sarkozy was President of the Hauts-de-Seine General Council); for instance, Philippe Douste-Blazy had to step down from the Toulouse mayorship upon joining the government.

As of 2007, no such rule was stated for the François Fillon government: Alain Juppé, former Minister for Development was mayor of Bordeaux, and was defeated in his National Assembly constituency (a third cumulative mandate) by 50.9% to 49.1% of the votes by the Socialist candidate. Additionally, Hervé Morin, the Minister of Defense, is mayor of Épaignes, and Éric Besson, Minister of Immigration and National Identity, is the mayor of Donzère.

== Greece ==
The dual mandate is a common phenomenon in Greek politics. Some Members of Parliament, by tradition, become members of the government, and appointing technocrats to ministerial offices is unusual. As a result, the executive branch, and particularly the Prime Minister, has direct control of the legislative one. Although there are some limitations. For instance, the President is prohibited from being an MP or holding any other office. To be inaugurated, the President's resignation is required. For mayors, governors or members of municipality councils it is unclear if they can hold other offices simultaneously with their current one. One example of a politician being an MP (1974–1989) and MEP (1984–1989) is that of Georgios Mavros, although traditionally MPs who were elected MEPs resigned first.

== Hong Kong ==
In Hong Kong, dual mandate is common for members of the territory's Legislative Council, who serve concurrently as members of one of the territory's eighteen district councils. Before the abolition of the two municipal councils in the territory in 1999, it was common for politicians to serve concurrently at all three levels.

It is also normal for Legislative Council members and District Concil's members to hold position with China's National People's Congress and Chinese People's Political Consultative Conference, with those positions appointed by the Chinese Government.

== Ireland ==
The instability caused by the close result of the 1981 general election was exacerbated by the number of government TDs who also served as MEPs and for whom the opposition refused pairing when they were abroad. This led to further elections in February 1982 and again in November.

In 1991, cabinet ministers and junior ministers were prohibited from serving as local councillors. The prohibition was extended to other Oireachtas members by the Local Government (No. 2) Act 2003, an amendment to the Local Government Act 2001. Attempts to include it in the 2001 Act failed after a rebellion by Fianna Fáil backbenchers; the 2003 Act passed after a compensation package was agreed for those losing out.

The 2001 Act prohibited being a member of multiple county or city councils, or multiple town councils, or both a town and city council. Brian O'Shea was a member of both Waterford City Council and Waterford County Council until 1993. County councillors were allowed to sit on a town council, and many did so. The 2003 Act provided that a candidate elected simultaneously to a forbidden combination of local councils has three days to choose which seat to take up, with the other or others then being considered vacant. The Local Government Reform Act 2014 abolished town councils and instead subdivided most counties into municipal districts; the county council's members are the district councillors for all districts within the county.

== Malaysia ==
Dual mandate is common in Malaysia. According to the Federal Constitution, a Member of Parliament (MP), whether elected to the Dewan Rakyat or appointed to the Dewan Negara, cannot hold membership in both houses of the Parliament. However, an MP may be elected as member of a State Legislative Assembly (MLA) at the same time. Consequently, an MP may be appointed to the State Cabinet through appointment as a nominated MLA while an MLA may be appointed as Minister or Deputy Minister in the Federal Government due to having membership in the Parliament.

== Philippines ==
Dual mandates are banned in the Philippines, based on Article VI, sections 13 and 14, and Article VII, section 13 of the constitution. As elections are synchronized, politicians run on just one position. In cases where a politician is elected or appointed to a new office while serving, the politician will have to vacate the prior office before taking office to the new one. An example includes Mark Villar who vacated his newly won congressional seat in order to become Secretary of Public Works and Highways in 2016.

== Poland ==
In Poland, dual mandate is mostly limited to combining the role of a member of parliament with positions of minister or vice-minister (state secretary).

According to Art. 102-108 of the Polish Constitution, members of both houses of parliament are barred from holding employment in government administration (with the exception of roles as members of the Council of Ministers and state secretaries), in the Chancellery of the Sejm, the Chancellery of the Senate and the Chancellery of the President of the Republic of Poland. Moreover, judges, public prosecutors, civil servants, soldiers in active military service, police officers and state security service officers may not hold a parliament mandate. Members of both houses of parliament are also barred from holding the office of president of the National Bank of Poland, the President of the Supreme Audit Office, the Ombudsman, the Ombudsman for Children and their deputies, a member of the Monetary Policy Council, a member of the National Broadcasting Council, or an ambassador.

On a statutory level, members of both houses of parliament are also barred from being members of councils of local government on all levels, or from holding the position of voivode or vice-voivode. They are also barred from running a business which makes use of public or communal property.

== Spain ==
Per the Spanish Constitution, legislators in the regional assemblies of the Autonomous Communities are barred from being elected to a seat in the Congress of Deputies, the lower house of the Cortes Generales. More precisely, regional legislators can run for the seat, but if elected they must choose between the regional and national parliaments. Nevertheless, members of lower tiers of the Spanish decentralized structure, such as provincial councillors or members of local councils, including mayors, can and have held seats in the Congress of Deputies. The rule barring regional legislators does not apply to the upper house of the Cortes, the Senate: in fact, regional legislatures are entitled to appoint a varying number of members from their ranks to the Senate, according to the population of the region. Currently, the Autonomous Communities appoint 56 Senators, the other 208 being directly elected in general elections.

== Turkey ==
Government ministers exercised dual mandate as sitting members of the Grand National Assembly until the Turkish constitution was amended to replace the parliamentary system following the 2017 Turkish constitutional referendum. The new presidential system prohibits cabinet ministers and other members of the executive branch from sitting in the Grand National Assembly.

== United Kingdom ==
=== European Parliament ===
At the EU level, prior to the 2009 European Parliament elections, there were a small number of members of the European Parliament who were also members of the House of Lords. However, it is now European law that a member of the European Parliament (MEP) may not be a member of the legislature of a member state. This, with regard to the United Kingdom, therefore applied to the House of Commons and the House of Lords, as the constituent bodies forming that member state's legislature. As it is impossible to disclaim a life peerage, it was ruled that peers (who sit as members of the House of Lords) had to take a "leave of absence" from the Lords in order to be an MEP; this was also the procedure for when a peer is the UK's European Commissioner, which was in recent times usually the case. The UK withdrew from the EU on 31 January 2020, ending British representation in the European Parliament.

=== Devolved legislatures ===
There were members of the House of Commons also holding seats in the Scottish Parliament, Welsh Parliament, or Northern Ireland Assembly.

The November 2009 report by the Committee on Standards in Public Life into the controversy surrounding MPs' expenses noted that "double jobbing" was "unusually ingrained in the political culture" of Northern Ireland, where 16 of 18 MPs were Stormont MLAs, compared to one Scottish MP being an MSP (First Minister Alex Salmond), and no Welsh MPs being AMs. The 2009 report recommended a ban with effect from the 2011 Stormont elections, which Northern Ireland parties vetoed. In 2012 Sinn Féin committed to end dual jobbing, with Deputy First Minister Martin McGuinness resigning his Westminster seat in 2013. Stormont parties agreed to the Northern Ireland (Miscellaneous Provisions) Act 2014's prohibiting MLAs holding seats in the Westminster Commons, or Dáil Éireann in Dublin, with effect from the next Stormont election (postponed from 2015 to 2016). In January 2022 the UK government planned to suspend the prohibition from the 2022 Assembly election until the 2024 United Kingdom general election; when the other Stormont parties objected that this favoured DUP leader Jeffrey Donaldson, the plan was withdrawn. Donaldson won a seat at Stormont but nominated Emma Little-Pengelly to fill it, while he kept his Westminster seat instead.

The Wales Act 2014 also applied a similar restriction on the then National Assembly for Wales (now the Senedd or Welsh Parliament) as from the Assembly election in 2016.

It remained possible for members of the Scottish Parliament to be members of the UK Parliament: prominent MSPs including Alex Salmond, John Swinney, Margaret Curran, and Cathy Jamieson simultaneously held seats in Holyrood and Westminster. The system came under scrutiny in the 2020s, with former leader of the Scottish Conservatives Douglas Ross facing criticism for double jobbing as the MP for Moray and the MSP for the Highlands and Islands from 2021 to 2024. The Scottish National Party Westminster leader Stephen Flynn stated in November 2024 that he would aim to hold a dual mandate by seeking election as MSP for Aberdeen South and North Kincardine while still serving as MP for Aberdeen South. However, due to internal party opposition, he announced he would not seek election to the Scottish Parliament while also being an MP. In December 2024, the Scottish Parliament unanimously backed an amendment to the Scottish Elections (Representation and Reform) Bill that would prohibit MSPs from also sitting as MPs or peers. The bill was enacted in 2025 and restricts MPs or life peers elected to Holyrood after that year. Flynn was elected MSP for Aberdeen Deeside and North Kincardine in 2026 and required him to vacate his Westminster seat within 49 days post-election. Secondary legislation for the 2025 act provides that in case of an MSP who holds a life peerage, there is a 14-day period to resign from the House of Lords.

=== Local government ===
English Devolution and Community Empowerment Act 2026, section 16 prohibits a member of the House of Commons, but not a peer in the House of Lords, from being simultaneously a mayor or council leader. They are also not allowed to serve as a councillor for a constituent council if elected as a directly elected mayor. Previously this prohibition applied only in circumstances other than the Greater Manchester and West Yorkshire mayoralties. Thus Ken Livingstone remained MP for Brent East until the dissolution of Parliament despite his election as Mayor of London a year before. Boris Johnson resigned his seat as MP for Henley on being elected mayor in 2008, but became an MP again in 2015, a year prior to the end of his second term as mayor (he did not seek a third term). Sadiq Khan, elected as the Labour mayor in the 2016 election, resigned his seat as MP for Tooting soon after his election to the mayoralty. Numerous members of the House of Lords however hold positions in local government.

At a lower level, it is common for people to hold seats on both a district council and a county council. Several MPs have also retained their council seats, most often until the expiration of their terms; Mike Hancock simultaneously held a council seat and a seat in Parliament between his election to Parliament in 1997 and his defeat in the local elections in 2014.

In Scotland, councillors elected to the Scottish Parliament since 2026 can remain MSPs if the next council election is due to occur within 372 days following the Holyrood election, otherwise an MSP has to relinquish a council seat during the 49-day grace period.

== United States ==
=== Federal ===
The United States Constitution prohibits members of the Senate or House from holding positions within the Executive Branch (Art. I, Sec. 6, cl. 2), and limits the president to his salary as chief executive, saying he may not "receive... any other Emolument from the United States, or any of them" (Art. II, Sec. 1, cl. 7). However, the Constitution places no restrictions that would prevent state or local office holders from simultaneously holding office in any branch of the federal government.

Historically, the U.S. inherited many basic political traditions from Great Britain, which in the eighteenth century tolerated several different forms of dual mandate. Following the establishment of the original Continental Congress and later Confederation Congress, the states possessed absolute discretion in regards to how delegates were chosen to serve, and it became common for state legislatures to appoint members from within their own ranks to Congress. At the time, this was a largely uncontroversial practise since it was widely assumed that the Congress would have relatively little to do (especially in peacetime) and that most of the consequential decision-making would take place at the state and local levels. A ban on dual mandates would therefore have been widely seen as unnecessary and unwelcome as it would have effectively barred Congressional delegates from what were perceived to be more important political posts, thus making election to the national Congress (already seen as a considerable burden due to the difficulties of eighteenth century travel) quite undesirable.

During the convention that established the present U.S. constitution, attention was primarily given to designing a federal government with branches that would be able operate independently of each other and free of undesirable foreign influence, which resulted in the aforementioned prohibitions. Barring state and local officials from federal office was not seriously debated. If it had been, it would likely have been fiercely opposed especially by the nascent anti-Federalist movement, many of whose members were keen to ensure that state officials with a vested interest in defending states' rights would be allowed to also serve simultaneously at the federal level, especially in Congress.

For the first few decades after the First United States Congress convened in 1789, Congress met infrequently and some states endeavored to accommodate dual mandates by holding their legislative sessions at times that would not conflict with Congressional sessions. Eventually, as the federal government grew in importance, Congress came to be seen as a source of great power. This created the potential for conflicts of interest and made it increasingly difficult to justify the holding of mandates at different levels of government to voters. In a closely related development, Congress began meeting more frequently than originally intended, which eventually made it impractical in most states for one person to serve simultaneously in the state and federal governments.

In time, the vast majority of states banned dual state and federal mandates. Today, the practice is forbidden by many state constitutions of many U.S. states, but as of January 2018 it was still legal in Connecticut, only for municipal offices. Unlike many other attempts at the state level intended to place additional restrictions besides those in the U.S. Constitution regarding who can represent them in Congress, most of which have been ruled unconstitutional by the United States Supreme Court, state-originated bans on dual mandates are constitutional because their prohibitions technically restrict who is allowed to serve at the state and/or local level (i.e. they typically place some sort of de jure prohibition barring federal officials from simultaneously serving at the state and/or local levels, resulting in a de facto prohibition on the reverse arrangement occurring).

Unlike many federations, U.S. states do not generally restrict state or federal officials from seeking office at another level of government without resigning their existing offices first. For example, in the four U.S. presidential elections contested from 1988 to 2000 inclusive, three sitting state governors were nominated for the presidency. These were Michael Dukakis in 1988, Bill Clinton in 1992 and George W. Bush in 2000. Dukakis remained Governor of Massachusetts following his defeat in the presidential election while Clinton and Bush, once elected president, promptly resigned their respective Arkansas and Texas governorships. Elsewhere, serving state officials often seek federal office, one prominent example being Illinois State Senator Barack Obama's election to the United States Senate in 2004 – Obama quickly resigned from the Illinois Senate after being elected to the U.S. Senate despite not being legally required to do so, and served as a U.S. senator until 2008 when he was elected president. Also, it is not uncommon for sitting federal officials to contest election to state offices, although in these cases the office sought is usually one of the state's highest political posts, typically governor – one such recent example being Mike Pence, who was a sitting U.S. Representative when he was first elected to the office of Governor of Indiana.

Also typically permitted is for one person to seek multiple offices at the same level of government in the same election, although attempting to simultaneously seek multiple offices in the same branch of government (e.g. a sitting U.S. Representative seeking re-election to the House and election to the U.S. Senate) is severely frowned on and prohibited in many states (the constitutionality of these prohibitions is uncertain). Recent examples include the 2000, 2008, and 2012 presidential elections where Senators Joe Lieberman, Joe Biden and Representative Paul Ryan respectively sought re-election and election to the vice presidency – only Biden was successfully elected vice president, but all three were re-elected to the offices in which they were the incumbents.

=== Illinois ===
In August 2008, Governor of Illinois Rod Blagojevich proposed legislation that would prohibit dual-office holding as part of changes to the state's ethics bill, stating that "dual government employment creates the potential for a conflict of interest because a legislator's duties to his or her constituents and his or her public employer are not always consistent." Critics, such as Representative Susana Mendoza, called the actions "spite" on the part of the governor.

=== New Jersey ===
Fulfilling a campaign pledge that he had made when first running for the New Jersey Legislature, Jack Sinagra sponsored a bill passed by the New Jersey Senate in 1992 that would ban the practice. At the time that the legislation first passed, there were some twenty elected officials who served in the New Jersey Legislature and another elected office, including Assemblyman Bill Pascrell, who was also mayor of Paterson, New Jersey; State Senator Ronald Rice, who also served on the Newark City Council; and Assemblyman John E. Rooney, who was also mayor of Northvale. These officials protested the proposed ban as interfering with the will of voters to elect officials as they see fit. A newspaper called former State senator Wayne R. Bryant the "king of double dipping" because he was collecting salaries from as many as four public jobs he held simultaneously.

Governor of New Jersey Jon Corzine signed legislation in September 2007 that banned the practice statewide, but those holding multiple offices as of 1 February 2008, including 19 state legislators, were grandfathered into the system and allowed to retain their positions. As of January 2024, only three of the nineteen (listed in bold) continue to hold a dual mandate.

Name, Party-County – Second Public Office:

Senators:

- Dana Redd, D-Camden – Councilwoman, Camden
- Nicholas Sacco, D-Hudson – Mayor, North Bergen
- **Paul Sarlo, D-Bergen – Mayor, Wood-Ridge**
- Robert Singer, R-Ocean – Committeeman, Lakewood
- **Brian Stack, D-Hudson – Mayor, Union City**
- Stephen Sweeney, D-Gloucester – Freeholder, Gloucester County

Assembly members:

- John Burzichelli, D-Gloucester – Mayor, Paulsboro
- Ralph Caputo, D-Essex – Freeholder, Essex County
- Anthony Chiappone, D-Hudson – Councilman, Bayonne
- Ronald Dancer, R-Ocean – Mayor, Plumsted Township
- Joseph Egan, D-Middlesex – Councilman, New Brunswick
- Elease Evans, D-Passaic – Freeholder, Passaic County
- John McKeon, D-Essex – Mayor, West Orange
- Paul D. Moriarty, D-Gloucester – Mayor, Washington Township
- Ruben Ramos, D-Hudson – Councilman, Hoboken
- Scott Rumana, R-Bergen – Mayor, Wayne
- **Gary Schaer, D-Passaic – Councilman, Passaic**
- Daniel Van Pelt, R-Ocean – Mayor, Ocean Township
- Joseph Vas, D-Middlesex – Mayor, Perth Amboy

=== Ohio ===
In February 2001, Jean Schmidt introduced legislation in the Ohio House of Representatives that would forbid public officials from receiving a government pension while still serving in office.

== See also ==
- Resign-to-run law
- Ministerial by-elections
- Norwegian Law (Israel)
- Personal union
