= Penn Plaza East =

Coordinates: 40°44′05″N 74°9′51″W

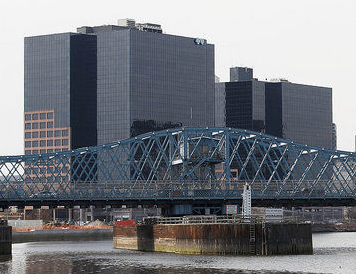
- Penn Plaza East and the Jackson Street Bridge on the Passaic River

General information
- Type: Office
- Location: Raymond Boulevard; Newark, New Jersey
- Completed: 1992
- Owner: Hartz Mountain

Technical details
- Floor count: 12/14

Design and construction
- Main contractor: p

3 Penn Plaza East

General information
- Type: Office
- Location: Raymond Boulevard; Newark, New Jersey
- Completed: 1992
- Owner: Horizon Blue Cross Blue Shield of New Jersey

Technical details
- Floor count: 17/21

Penn Plaza East is an office building complex located near Penn Station in Newark, New Jersey. Fronting Raymond Boulevard on the banks of the Passaic River, the two office building complex were constructed during a period in the late 1980s and early 1990s when they and numerous postmodern skyscrapers were built near the station and Gateway Center. While others went up between the station and traditional Downtown Newark, Penn Plaza East is on the Ironbound, or east, side of the major transportation hub. The two towers sit above a four-story parking facility and lobby that joins them.

Originally developed and owned by Hartz Mountain Industries, one building was later acquired by Horizon Blue Cross Blue Shield of New Jersey. In February 2023 NJ Transit, which long had its headquarters had acquired Penn Plaza 1 in 2022, announced it would relocate its to the nearby Gateway II building.

In December NJ Transit and Horizon announced their intentions to redevelop the site for mixed - commercial and residential - uses. The parcel adjacent to the buildings on the waterfront side is a potential site for the development of housing, zoned for up to 30 stories. The parking area in the shadow of the Dock Bridge will be developed as part of Newark Riverfront Park, a promenade along the banks of the Passaic River.

== See also ==
- List of tallest buildings in Newark
- List of tallest buildings in Jersey City
