= Cleopatra Tucker =

Member of the New Jersey General Assembly

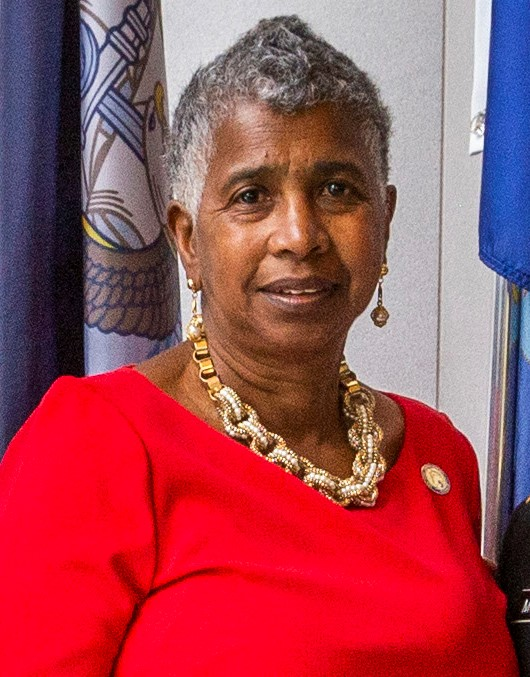

Member of the New Jersey General Assembly from the 28th district
- Incumbent
- Assumed office January 8, 2008 Serving with: Ralph R. Caputo (2008–2023); Jackie Yustein (2023–2024); Garnet Hall (2024–present)
- Preceded by: Craig A. Stanley; Oadline Truitt

Personal details
- Born: Cleopatra Gibson; April 9, 1943 (age 83) Birmingham, Alabama, U.S.
- Party: Democratic
- Spouse: Donald Kofi Tucker (died 2005)
- Children: 2
- Education: Tennessee State University
- Occupation: Non-profit director
- Website: Assemblywoman Tucker's legislative webpage

Cleopatra Gibson Tucker (born April 9, 1943) is an American Democratic Party politician, who has represented the 28th Legislative District in the New Jersey General Assembly since 2008.

== Biography ==
Tucker was born and raised in Birmingham, Alabama. She attended Tennessee State University, majoring in sociology. After moving to Newark, New Jersey, in 1966, she was hired by the Newark Housing Authority in 1976. She retired from the Authority in 2002. She is currently the executive director of a non-profit organization called The Centre, Inc. The Centre's headquarters was named after her late husband, Donald Kofi Tucker, in 2006.

== Personal life ==
Tucker has two grown children with her late husband and is a resident of Newark's Weequahic neighborhood.

== Political career ==
After Donald Tucker, who was both a Newark councilman and an Assemblyman, died in October 2005 and posthumously won re-election to his Assembly seat, Assemblyman Tucker was replaced in a special election convention by Evelyn Williams, who was elected to serve the remaining month of the term and to serve the first year of the full term. Williams resigned from the Assembly in January 2006 before the start of the new session, following her arrest for shoplifting, creating a vacant seat. A special election convention appointed Democratic Party activist Oadline Truitt to the seat for the first half of the term and she was re-elected in a November 2006 special election. In Truitt's first bid for a full two-year term, Tucker and Essex County Freeholder and former Assemblyman from the 1960s-1970s Ralph R. Caputo defeated Truitt and incumbent Assemblyman Craig A. Stanley in the June 2007 Democratic primary. Tucker and Caputo had the backing of Newark Mayor Cory Booker. Tucker has subsequently won re-election to the Assembly every two years since then.

In January 2011, Tucker introduced a bill that would require every bicycle in the state of New Jersey to display a license plate, which would be registered with the government for a small fee. Within about a week, she withdrew her proposal.

=== Committees ===
Committee assignments for the 2024—2025 Legislative Session are:

- Military and Veterans' Affairs (as chair)
- Aging and Human Services (as vice-chair)

=== District 28 ===
Each of the 40 districts in the New Jersey Legislature has one representative in the New Jersey Senate and two members in the New Jersey General Assembly. The representatives from the 28th District for the 2024—2025 Legislative Session are:

- Senator Renee Burgess (D)
- Assemblyman Garnet Hall (D)
- Assemblywoman Cleopatra Tucker (D)

== Electoral history ==
28th Legislative District General Election, 2023
Party	Candidate	Votes	%
Democratic	Cleopatra G. Tucker (incumbent)	19,094	46.3
Democratic	Garnet Hall	18,637	45.2
Republican	Joy Freeman	1,902	4.6
Republican	Willie S. Jetti	1,600	3.9
Total votes		41,233	100.0
Democratic hold			
Democratic hold			

28th legislative district general election, 2021
Party	Candidate	Votes	%
Democratic	Ralph R. Caputo (incumbent)	32,797	39.24%
Democratic	Cleopatra G. Tucker (incumbent)	32,719	39.15%
Republican	Monique Headen	9,063	10.84%
Republican	Anthony D'Angelo	9,005	10.77%
Total votes		83,584	100.0
Democratic hold			

28th Legislative District General Election, 2019
Party	Candidate	Votes	%
Democratic	Ralph Caputo (incumbent)	16,234	41.5%
Democratic	Cleopatra Tucker (incumbent)	15,998	40.8%
Republican	Joy Bembry-Freeman	3,282	8.4%
Republican	Antonio Pires	3,025	7.7%
Independent	Derrick Ross	637	1.6%
Total votes		37,284	100%
Democratic hold			

New Jersey General Assembly
Preceded by Craig A. Stanley; Oadline Truitt	Member of the New Jersey General Assembly for the 28th District; January 8, 2008 – present With: Ralph R. Caputo	Succeeded by Incumbent
