= Harry A. McEnroe =

American politician (1931–2021)

Member of the New Jersey General Assembly
- In office January 8, 1980 – January 9, 1996
- Preceded by: Mary Scanlon
- Succeeded by: Craig A. Stanley
- Constituency: 28th district (1980–82); 27th district (1982–94); 28th district (1994–96)

Member of the Essex County Board of Chosen Freeholders
- In office 1973–1979

Personal details
- Born: January 25, 1931 Newark, New Jersey
- Died: February 8, 2021 (aged 90) Mantoloking, New Jersey
- Party: Democratic

Harry A. McEnroe (January 25, 1931 – February 8, 2021) was an American Democratic Party politician from New Jersey.

He made his first bid for public office in 1971, running for the New Jersey General Assembly in Essex County District 11E. McEnroe and his running mate, Gerald Simons, were defeated by the Republican incumbents, Thomas Kean (the future Governor) and Philip Kaltenbacher.

McEnroe was elected to the Essex County Board of Chosen Freeholders in 1973, and was re-elected in 1976. He did not seek another term in 1978 when Essex County changed its form of government. He was elected to the State Assembly in 1979, and was re-elected in 1981, 1983, 1985, 1987, 1989, 1991, and 1993. He lost his bid for re-election to a 9th term in 1995 when he was defeated in the Democratic primary by Craig A. Stanley by 612 votes. His defeat came after the powerful Essex County Democratic Organization withdrew their support of his re-election. In 2000, he endorsed Republican Bob Franks for U.S. Senate against the Democratic candidate, Jon Corzine. He served many years as the South Orange Democratic Party Chairman.

He died on February 8, 2021, at age 90, in Mantoloking, New Jersey.

== Electoral history ==
=== New Jersey General Assembly ===
28th Legislative District general election, 1993
Party	Candidate	Votes	%
Democratic	Harry A. McEnroe (incumbent)	23,128	38.47
Democratic	James Zangari (incumbent)	21,357	35.52
Republican	Phyllis C. Cedola	8,354	13.9
Republican	Eugene L. Brenycz	7,282	12.11
Total votes		60,121	100
Democratic hold			

==== Democratic Primaries ====
28th Legislative District Democratic Primary election, 1995
Candidate	Votes	%
Wilfredo Caraballo	6,641	28.08
Craig A. Stanley	6,172	26.1
Harry A. McEnroe	5,550	23.47
Michael G. Steele	5,289	22.36
Total votes	23,652	100

28th Legislative District Democratic Primary election, 1993
Candidate	Votes	%
James Zangari (incumbent)	5,898	48.68
Harry A. McEnroe (incumbent)	4,074	33.62
David Hammonds	1,136	9.38
Alan Morton	1,008	8.32
Total votes	12,116	100
