= Donald Kofi Tucker =

American politician (1938–2005)

Member of the New Jersey General Assembly
- In office January 13, 1998 – October 17, 2005
- Preceded by: Willie B. Brown; Alberto Coutinho
- Succeeded by: Evelyn Williams
- Constituency: 29th District (1998–2002); 28th District (2002–2005)

Personal details
- Born: March 18, 1938 Newark, New Jersey
- Died: October 17, 2005 (aged 67)
- Party: Democratic
- Spouse: Cleopatra Tucker
- Education: Goddard College (BA)

Military service
- Allegiance: United States
- Branch/service: United States Air Force
- Years of service: 1955–1959
- Rank: Airman second class

Donald Kofi Tucker (March 18, 1938 – October 17, 2005) was an American politician who served in the New Jersey General Assembly from 1998 until his death in 2005, representing the 29th district and later the 28th. He was also a member of the Municipal Council of Newark, serving from 1974 until his death.

Tucker received a B.A. degree from Goddard College in Urban Planning. He served in the United States Air Force from 1955 to 1959 as an Airman Second Class.

Tucker served as a Councilman-at-Large in Newark and served on the Newark Municipal Council from 1974 and on the Passaic Valley Sewerage Commission from 1985.

Tucker was a member of the Essex County chapter of the Congress of Racial Equality and was involved in efforts to desegregate Newark's public housing projects. He founded a tenants' council and served as chairman of the New Jersey Black Issues Convention.

He was the Assembly's Speaker Pro Tempore from 2002 until his death. Tucker served on the Assembly's Commerce and Economic Development Committee (as Chair) and on the Joint Committee on the Public Schools.

Despite his failing health — he suffered from diabetes, survived a stroke, and had a pacemaker implanted — he remained in his seat in the Assembly and on the Newark City Council (where he served for 31 continuous years) until his death in 2005. In 2008, his widow, Cleopatra Tucker, was elected to the Assembly to represent the 28th district.
