= Evelyn Williams (politician) =

American politician

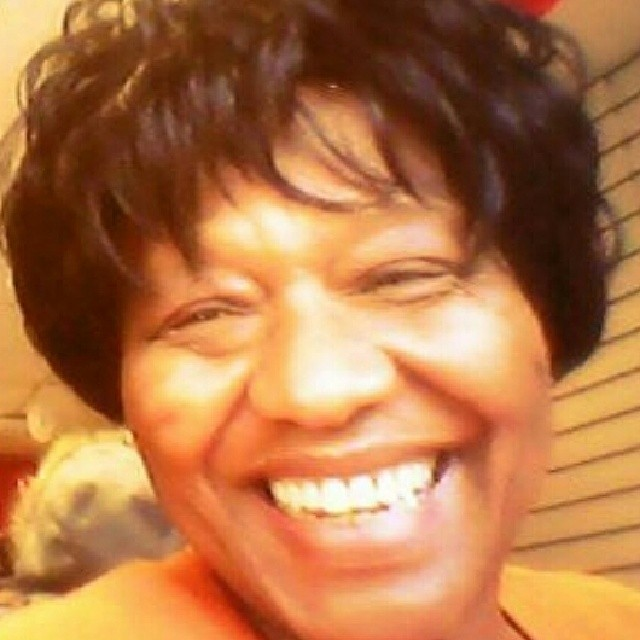
Evelyn Williams

Evelyn Williams is an American Democratic Party politician who briefly served in the New Jersey General Assembly representing the 28th Legislative District.

She was elected in two special convention votes in 2005 to succeed Donald Kofi Tucker who died on October 17, 2005. Williams, a resident of Newark's South Ward, was elected to replace Tucker for the remainder of the 2004-2006 term and to serve until a special election could be held in November 2006 to fill the remainder of the 2006-2008 term Tucker began serving in 2005.

Williams was arrested the week of December 22, 2005 on charges of shoplifting from an Irvington, New Jersey discount store. Following her arrest, both the Newark Star-Ledger and political website PoliticsNJ.com ran a series of articles on her, exposing her alleged theft of a hefty state pension normally reserved for policeman and firemen in active duty that she should not have qualified for.

In January 2006, she was also accused of failing to pay election workers assisting with the gubernatorial campaign of fellow Democrat Jon Corzine.

On January 6, 2006, Williams submitted a letter of resignation to Essex County Democratic Chair Phil Thigpen announcing her intentions to step down to clear up "misconceptions" regarding her conduct. She was replaced by Oadline Truitt at a meeting of the Essex County Democratic Committee on January 9, 2006, one day before the New Jersey General Assembly reorganized for the 2006 session. During her service as an assemblywoman, she attended one voting session of the Assembly.

Williams worked in social services for the Essex County Department of Corrections until she was fired in December 2005 of charges related to improperly collecting her pension. She previously served as Deputy Mayor of Newark and as President of the Newark Board of Education.

Preceded by Donald Kofi Tucker	New Jersey State Assemblywoman - 28th Legislative District; December 12, 2005-January 10, 2006	Succeeded by Oadline Truitt
