= Horizon Blue Cross Blue Shield of New Jersey =

3 Penn Plaza East

General information
- Type: Office
- Location: 3 Penn Plaza East; Newark, New Jersey
- Completed: 1992
- Owner: Horizon Blue Cross Blue Shield of New Jersey

Technical details
- Floor count: 17/21

Horizon Blue Cross Blue Shield of New Jersey, headquartered in Newark, New Jersey is the only licensed Blue Cross Blue Shield Association plan in New Jersey, providing health insurance coverage to over 3.2 million people throughout all of New Jersey.

It is a not-for-profit health service corporation with a 17-member Board of Directors which governs the company for its members. There are no shareholders. Horizon Blue Cross Blue Shield of New Jersey is best known for their managed care and traditional indemnity plans for individuals and employers.

== History ==
Horizon BCBSNJ traces its history back to 1932 when Associated Hospitals of Essex County, Inc. was formed as a multi-hospital prepayment plan. The company later became the nation's first Blue Cross Plan.

The insurance provider has long been based in Newark, for many years occupying 33 Washington Street, and now owning its own building at Penn Plaza East.

== Awards and recognition ==
In January 2016, Horizon BCBS announced their newest endeavor to improve care quality and lower costs through their Omnia Health Alliance. The new Omnia health insurance plans provide access to all of Horizon's network hospitals with some of them being designated as Tier 1 with greater cost savings for consumers.
