= New Jersey General Assembly =

Lower house of the New Jersey Legislature

- 222nd New Jersey Legislature

Type
- Type: Lower house
- Term limits: None

History
- New session started: January 13, 2026

Leadership
- Speaker: Craig Coughlin (D) since January 9, 2018
- Speaker pro tempore: Annette Quijano (D) since January 30, 2025
- Majority Leader: Louis Greenwald (D) since January 10, 2012
- Minority Leader: John DiMaio (R) since January 11, 2022

Structure
- Seats: 80
- Political groups: Majority: Democratic (57); Minority: Republican (23)
- Length of term: 2 years
- Authority: Article IV, New Jersey Constitution
- Salary: 82,000/year

Elections
- Voting system: Plurality block voting
- Last election: November 4, 2025
- Next election: November 2, 2027
- Redistricting: New Jersey Apportionment Commission

Meeting place
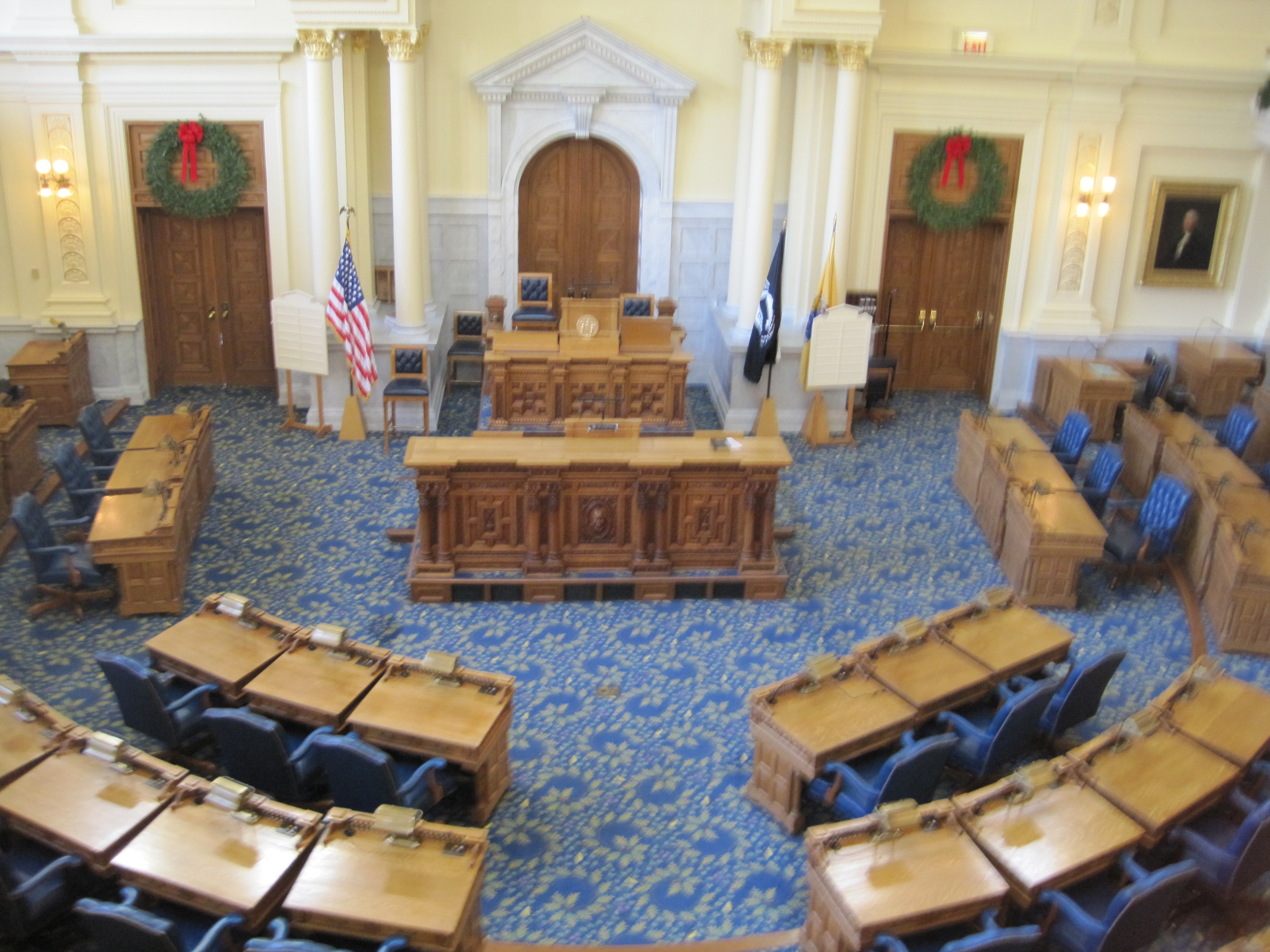
- General Assembly Chamber; New Jersey State House; Trenton, New Jersey

Website
- www.njleg.state.nj.us

The New Jersey General Assembly is the lower house of the New Jersey Legislature, the upper house being the New Jersey Senate.

Since the election of 1967 (1968 session), the Assembly has consisted of 80 members. Two members are elected from each of New Jersey's 40 legislative districts using plurality block voting for a term of two years, each representing districts with average populations of 232,225 (2020 figures), with deviation in each district not exceeding 3.21% above and below that average. To be eligible to run, a potential candidate must be at least 21 years of age, and must have lived in their district for at least one year prior to the election, and have lived in the state of New Jersey for two years. They also must be residents of their districts. Membership in the Assembly is considered a part-time job, and many members have employment in addition to their legislative work. Assembly members serve two-year terms, elected every odd-numbered year in November. One current member of the Assembly, Gary Schaer, holds another elective office (Passaic City Council President), as he is grandfathered in under a New Jersey law that banned multiple office holding in 2007.

The Assembly is led by the speaker of the Assembly, who is elected by the membership of the chamber. After the lieutenant governor and the president of the New Jersey Senate, the speaker of the Assembly is third in the line of succession to replace the governor of New Jersey in the event that the governor is unable to execute the duties of that office. The speaker decides the schedule for the Assembly, which bills will be considered, appoints committee chairmen, and generally runs the Assembly's agenda. The current speaker is Craig Coughlin (D-Woodbridge).

== Composition ==
Affiliation	Party (Shading indicates majority caucus)		Total	Vacant
Affiliation	Democratic	Republican	Total	Vacant
2018–2020	54	26	80	0
2020–2022	52	28	80	0
2022–2024	46	34	80	0
2024–2026	52	28	80	0
2026–2028	57	23	80	0
Latest voting share	71.3%	28.8%		

=== List of state assembly members ===
District	Name	Party	Start	Counties	Residence
1	Erik Simonsen	Republican	January 14, 2020	Atlantic, Cape May, Cumberland	Lower Township
1	Antwan McClellan	Republican	January 14, 2020	Atlantic, Cape May, Cumberland	Ocean City
2	Don Guardian	Republican	January 11, 2022	Atlantic	Atlantic City
2	Maureen Rowan	Democratic	January 13, 2026	Atlantic	Atlantic City
3	Heather Simmons	Democratic	January 9, 2024	Cumberland, Gloucester, Salem	Glassboro
3	David Bailey	Democratic	January 9, 2024	Cumberland, Gloucester, Salem	Woodstown
4	Dan Hutchison	Democratic	January 9, 2024	Atlantic, Camden, Gloucester	Gloucester Township
4	Cody Miller	Democratic	January 9, 2024	Atlantic, Camden, Gloucester	Monroe Township
5	William Spearman	Democratic	June 30, 2018	Camden, Gloucester	Camden
5	Bill Moen	Democratic	January 14, 2020	Camden, Gloucester	Camden
6	Louis Greenwald	Democratic	January 9, 1996	Burlington, Camden	Voorhees Township
6	Melinda Kane	Democratic	January 23, 2025	Burlington, Camden	Cherry Hill
7	Carol A. Murphy	Democratic	January 9, 2018	Burlington	Mount Laurel
7	Balvir Singh	Democratic	January 30, 2025	Burlington	Burlington Township
8	Andrea Katz	Democratic	January 9, 2024	Atlantic, Burlington	Chesterfield Township
8	Anthony Angelozzi	Democratic	January 13, 2026	Atlantic, Burlington	Hammonton
9	Brian E. Rumpf	Republican	June 23, 2003	Ocean	Little Egg Harbor
9	Greg Myhre	Republican	January 9, 2024	Ocean	Stafford
10	Gregory P. McGuckin	Republican	January 10, 2012	Ocean, Monmouth	Toms River
10	Paul Kanitra	Republican	January 9, 2024	Ocean, Monmouth	Point Pleasant Beach
11	Margie Donlon	Democratic	January 9, 2024	Monmouth	Ocean Township
11	Luanne Peterpaul	Democratic	January 9, 2024	Monmouth	Long Branch
12	Alex Sauickie	Republican	July 23, 2022	Burlington, Middlesex, Monmouth, Ocean	Jackson Township
12	Robert D. Clifton	Republican	January 10, 2012	Burlington, Middlesex, Monmouth, Ocean	Matawan
13	Vicky Flynn	Republican	January 11, 2022	Monmouth	Holmdel
13	Gerard Scharfenberger	Republican	January 14, 2020	Monmouth	Middletown
14	Wayne DeAngelo	Democratic	January 8, 2008	Mercer, Middlesex	Hamilton Township
14	Tennille McCoy	Democratic	January 8, 2024	Mercer, Middlesex	Hamilton Township
15	Verlina Reynolds-Jackson	Democratic	February 15, 2018	Hunterdon, Mercer	Trenton
15	Anthony Verrelli	Democratic	August 5, 2018	Hunterdon, Mercer	Hopewell Township
16	Mitchelle Drulis	Democratic	January 9, 2024	Hunterdon, Mercer, Middlesex, Somerset	East Amwell
16	Roy Freiman	Democratic	January 9, 2018	Hunterdon, Mercer, Middlesex, Somerset	Hillsborough Township
17	Joseph Danielsen	Democratic	October 16, 2014	Middlesex, Somerset	Franklin Township
17	Kevin Egan	Democratic	January 9, 2024	Middlesex, Somerset	New Brunswick
18	Sterley Stanley	Democratic	January 27, 2021	Middlesex	East Brunswick
18	Robert Karabinchak	Democratic	May 26, 2016	Middlesex	Edison
19	Craig Coughlin	Democratic	January 13, 2010	Middlesex	Woodbridge
19	Yvonne Lopez	Democratic	January 9, 2018	Middlesex	Perth Amboy
20	Annette Quijano	Democratic	September 25, 2008	Union	Elizabeth
20	Ed Rodriguez	Democratic	January 13, 2026	Union	Elizabeth
21	Vincent Kearney	Democratic	January 13, 2026	Middlesex, Morris, Somerset, Union	Garwood
21	Andrew Macurdy	Democratic	January 13, 2026	Middlesex, Morris, Somerset, Union	Summit
22	James J. Kennedy	Democratic	January 12, 2016	Somerset, Union	Rahway
22	Linda S. Carter	Democratic	May 24, 2018	Somerset, Union	Plainfield
23	Erik Peterson	Republican	December 7, 2009	Hunterdon, Somerset, Warren	Franklin Township
23	John DiMaio	Republican	February 21, 2009	Hunterdon, Somerset, Warren	Hackettstown
24	Dawn Fantasia	Republican	January 9, 2024	Morris, Sussex, Warren	Franklin Borough
24	Mike Inganamort	Republican	January 9, 2024	Morris, Sussex, Warren	Chester Township
25	Aura Dunn	Republican	November 21, 2019	Morris, Passaic	Mendham Borough
25	Marisa Sweeney	Democratic	January 13, 2026	Morris, Passaic	Morristown
26	Brian Bergen	Republican	January 14, 2020	Morris, Passaic	Denville
26	Jay Webber	Republican	January 8, 2008	Morris, Passaic	Morris Plains
27	Rosy Bagolie	Democratic	January 9, 2024	Essex, Passaic	Livingston
27	Alixon Collazos-Gill	Democratic	January 9, 2024	Essex, Passaic	Montclair
28	Cleopatra Tucker	Democratic	January 8, 2008	Essex, Union	Newark
28	Chigozie Onyema	Democratic	January 13, 2026	Essex, Union	Newark
29	Eliana Pintor Marin	Democratic	September 11, 2013	Essex, Hudson	Newark
29	Shanique Speight	Democratic	January 9, 2018	Essex, Hudson	Newark
30	Sean T. Kean	Republican	January 10, 2012	Monmouth, Ocean	Wall
30	Avi Schnall	Democratic	January 9, 2024	Monmouth, Ocean	Lakewood Township
31	William Sampson	Democratic	January 11, 2022	Hudson	Bayonne
31	Jerry Walker	Democratic	January 13, 2026	Hudson	Jersey City
32	Ravi Bhalla	Democratic	January 13, 2026	Hudson	Hoboken
32	Katie Brennan	Democratic	January 13, 2026	Hudson	Jersey City
33	Gabe Rodriguez	Democratic	January 9, 2024	Hudson	West New York
33	Larry Wainstein	Democratic	January 13, 2026	Hudson	North Bergen
34	Michael Venezia	Democratic	January 9, 2024	Essex	Bloomfield
34	Carmen Morales	Democratic	January 9, 2024	Essex	Belleville
35	Al Abdelaziz	Democratic	January 23, 2025	Bergen, Passaic	Paterson
35	Kenyatta Stewart	Democratic	January 13, 2026	Bergen, Passaic	Paterson
36	Gary Schaer	Democratic	January 10, 2006	Bergen, Passaic	Passaic
36	Clinton Calabrese	Democratic	February 10, 2018	Bergen, Passaic	Cliffside Park
37	Ellen Park	Democratic	January 11, 2022	Bergen	Englewood Cliffs
37	Shama Haider	Democratic	January 11, 2022	Bergen	Tenafly
38	Lisa Swain	Democratic	May 24, 2018	Bergen	Fair Lawn
38	Chris Tully	Democratic	May 24, 2018	Bergen	Bergenfield
39	John V. Azzariti	Republican	January 9, 2024	Bergen	Saddle River
39	Robert Auth	Republican	January 14, 2014	Bergen	Old Tappan
40	Al Barlas	Republican	January 9, 2024	Bergen, Essex, Passaic	Cedar Grove
40	Christopher DePhillips	Republican	January 9, 2018	Bergen, Essex, Passaic	Wyckoff

== Committees and committee chairs ==
Committee chairs for the 2026–2028 Legislative Session are:

- Aging & Human Services - Shanique Speight (D-District 29)
- Agriculture and Natural Resources - Andrea Katz (D-District 8)
- Appropriations - Lisa Swain (D-District 38)
- Budget - Eliana Pintor Marin (D-District 29)
- Children, Families, and Food Security - Shama Haider (D-District 37)
- Commerce and Economic Development - William Spearman (D-District 5)
- Community Development & Women's Affairs - Tennille McCoy (D-District 14)
- Consumer Affairs - William Sampson (D-District 31)
- Education - Verlina Reynolds-Jackson (D-District 15)
- Environment and Solid Waste - James J. Kennedy (D-District 22)
- Financial Institutions and Insurance - Roy Freiman (D-District 16)
- Health - Carol Murphy (D-District 7)
- Health Infrastructure - Sterley Stanley (D-District 18)
- Higher Education - Carmen Morales (D-District 34)
- Housing - Yvonne Lopez (D-District 19)
- Judiciary - Ellen Park (D-District 37)
- Labor - Anthony Verrelli (D-District 15)
- Military and Veterans' Affairs - Cleopatra Tucker (D-District 28)
- Oversight, Reform, and Federal Relations - Alexander Schnall (D-District 30)
- Public Safety and Preparedness - Joseph Danielsen (D-District 17)
- Regulated Professions - Dan Hutchison (D-District 4)
- Science, Innovation, and Technology - Chris Tully (D-District 38)
- State and Local Government - Robert Karabinchak (D-District 18)
- Telecommunications and Utilities - Wayne DeAngelo (D-District 14)
- Tourism, Gaming, and the Arts - William Moen (D-District 5)
- Transportation and Independent Authorities - Clinton Calabrese (D-District 36)

== History ==
See: New Jersey Legislature#Colonial period and New Jersey Legislative Council#Composition

=== Salary and costs ===
Service as a state senator or member of the General Assembly is considered to be part-time. Effective 2002, state senators and members of the General Assembly receive an annual base salary of $49,000 with the Senate president and the Assembly speaker earning slightly more (1/3 over the base). This was an increase from $35,000, which had been in effect since 1990. Beginning in 2026, the base salary will increase to $82,000. Additionally, each legislator receives an annual allowance of $150,000 for staff salaries. In the 2025 fiscal year, the total cost of the legislature in the state budget was $127,346,000. Of this amount, $18,690,000 was appropriated to the State Senate for salaries and other costs, and $25,208,000 was appropriated to the General Assembly.

=== "Double dipping" ===
Under state law that remained in effect until 2008, members of the New Jersey Assembly and Senate were allowed to serve in the legislature while still serving in any other government positions they might have held at the time. Those still doing so in 2008 were "grandfathered":

Name, Party-County – Second Public Office (name in bold represents state Assembly member still in both local and state offices as of 2025):

Assembly members:

- John J. Burzichelli, D-Gloucester – Mayor, Paulsboro
- Ralph R. Caputo, D-Essex – Freeholder, Essex County
- Anthony Chiappone, D-Hudson – Councilmember, Bayonne
- Ronald S. Dancer, R-Ocean – Mayor, Plumsted Township
- Joseph V. Egan, D-Middlesex – Councilman, New Brunswick
- Elease Evans, D-Passaic – Freeholder, Passaic County
- John F. McKeon, D-Essex – Mayor, West Orange
- Paul D. Moriarty, D-Gloucester – Mayor, Washington Township
- Ruben J. Ramos, D-Hudson – Councilmember, Hoboken
- Scott Rumana, R-Passaic – Mayor, Wayne
- **Gary Schaer, D-Passaic – Councilmember, Passaic**
- Daniel Van Pelt, R-Ocean – Mayor, Ocean Township
- Joseph Vas, D-Middlesex – Mayor, Perth Amboy

== See also ==
- Category:Members of the New Jersey General Assembly
- New Jersey State Constitution
- List of New Jersey state legislatures
