= West Orange, New Jersey =

Township in Essex County, New Jersey, US

- Township
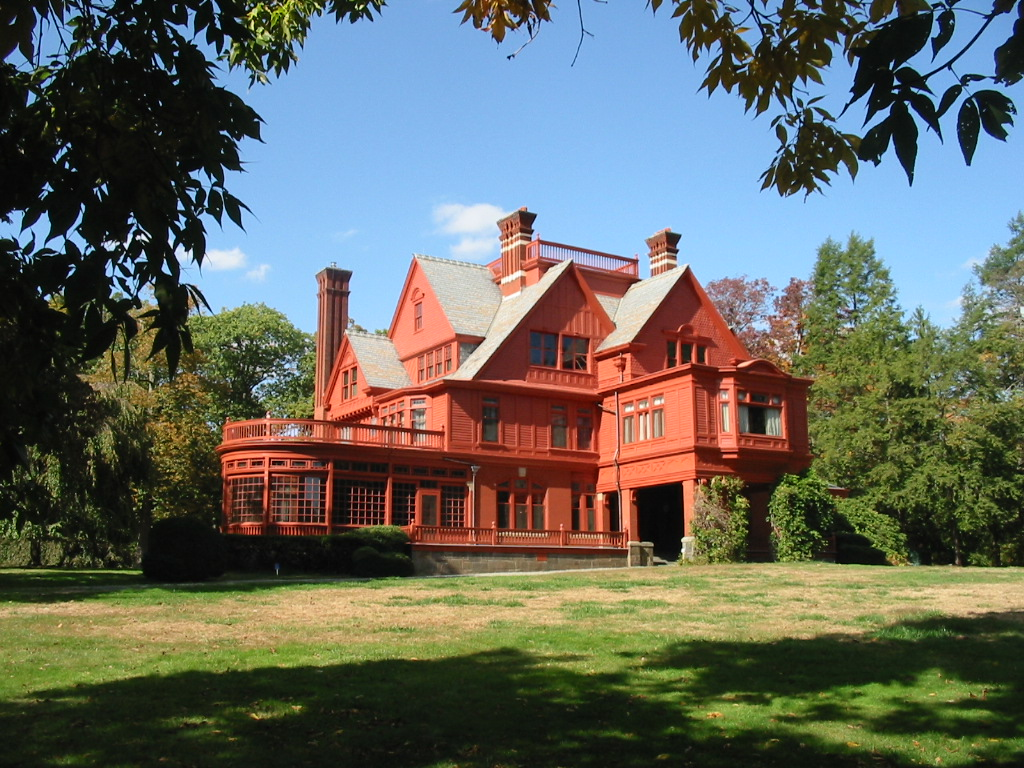
- Glenmont, part of the Thomas Edison National Historical Park located in Llewellyn Park

- Flag Seal
- Motto: "Where Invention Lives"
- Interactive map of West Orange, New Jersey
- Location in Essex County Location in New Jersey Location in the United States
- Coordinates: 40.785755°N 74.265058°W
- Country: United States
- State: New Jersey
- County: Essex
- Incorporated: April 10, 1863 (as township)
- Reincorporated: February 28, 1900 (as town)

Government
  - Type: Faulkner Act (mayor–council)
  - Body: Township Council
  - Mayor: Susan McCartney (term ends December 31, 2026)
  - Business Administrator: Peter F. Smeraldo Jr.
  - Municipal clerk: Karen J. Carnevale

Area
  - Total: 12.13 sq mi (31.41 km^{2})
  - Land: 12.00 sq mi (31.09 km^{2})
  - Water: 0.12 sq mi (0.32 km^{2}) 1.01%
  - Rank: 189th of 565 in state 3rd of 22 in county
- Elevation: 512 ft (156 m)

Population (2020)
  - Total: 48,843
  - Estimate (2024): 49,211
  - Rank: 39th of 565 in state 5th of 22 in county
  - Density: 4,069.2/sq mi (1,571.1/km^{2})
  - Rank: 154th of 565 in state 14th of 22 in county
- Time zone: UTC−05:00 (Eastern (EST))
  - Summer (DST): UTC−04:00 (Eastern (EDT))
- ZIP Code: 07052
- Area code: 973
- FIPS code: 3401379800
- GNIS feature ID: 1729718
- Website: www.westorange.org

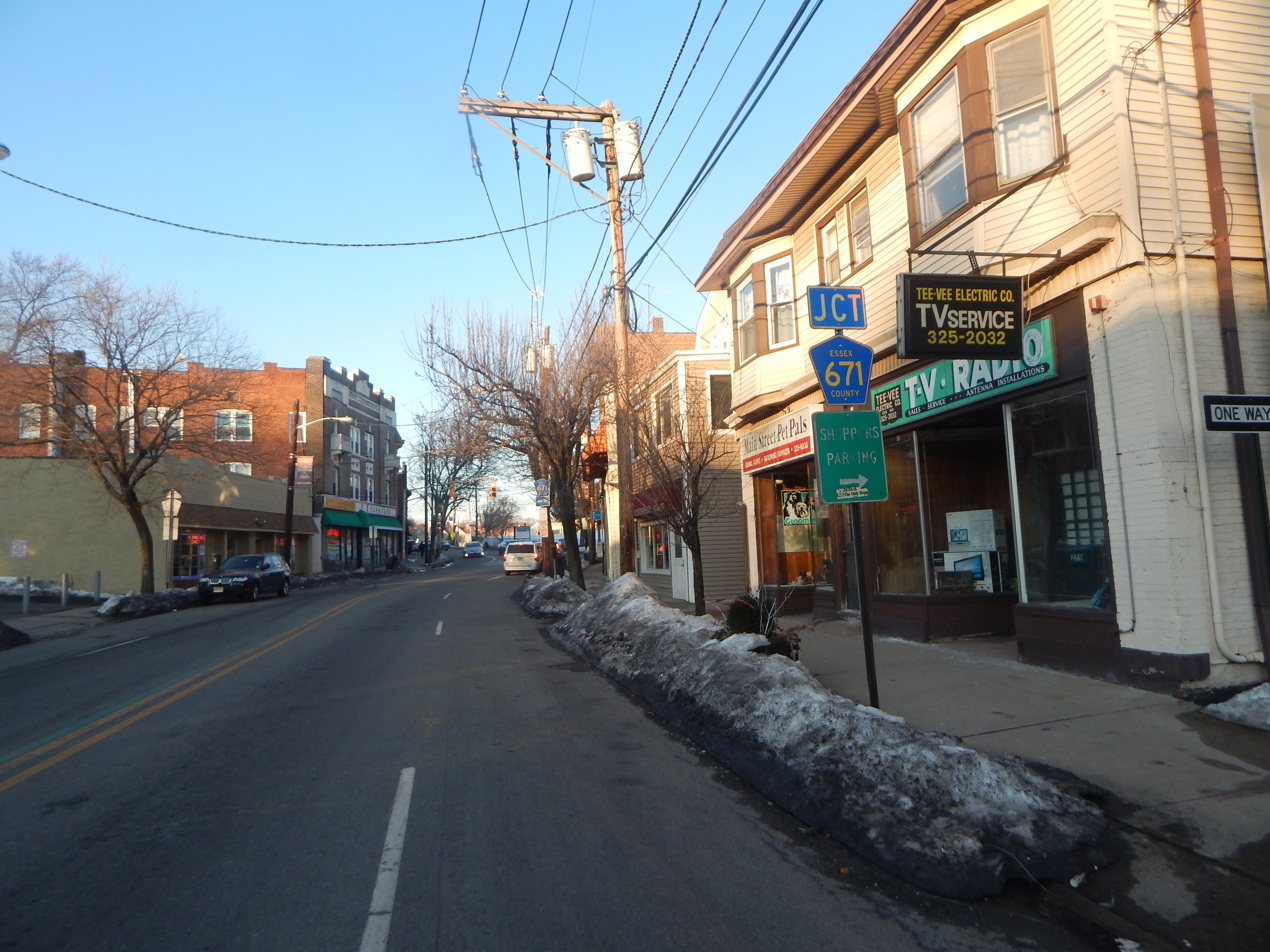
Main Street in West Orange

West Orange is a suburban township in Essex County, in the U.S. state of New Jersey. As of the 2020 United States census, the township's population was 48,843, an increase of 2,636 (+5.7%) from the 2010 census count of 46,207, which in turn reflected an increase of 1,264 (+2.8%) from the 44,943 counted in the 2000 census.

West Orange is both an inner-ring suburb of New Jersey's largest city, Newark, and a commuter suburb of New York City; it is approximately 12 miles (19 km) west of Manhattan. West Orange was home to the inventor Thomas Edison, who also maintained a laboratory and workshop in town.

== History ==
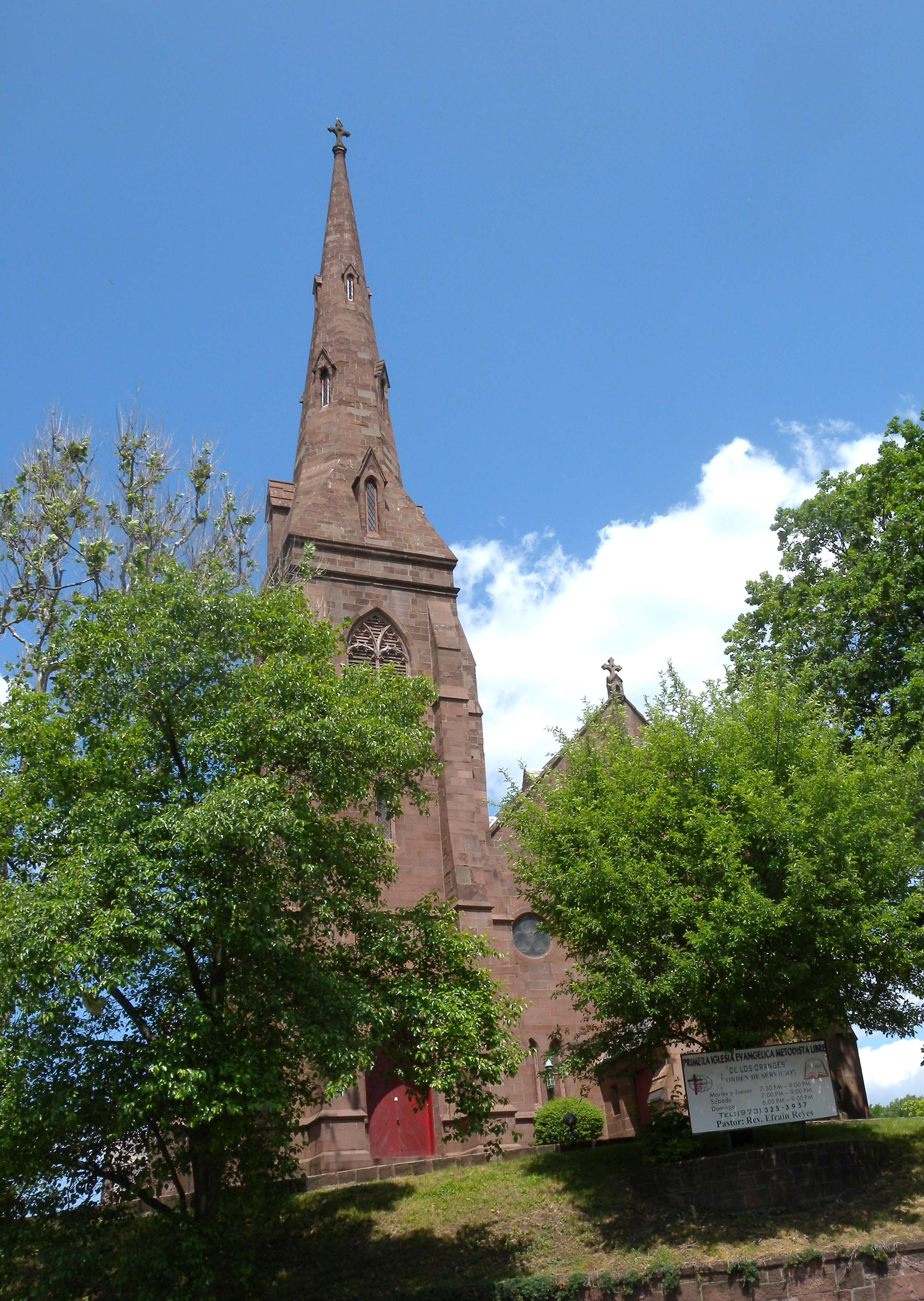
Evangelical Methodist Church

West Orange was originally part of the Native American Hackensack clan's territory, for over 10,000 years. The Hackensack were a phratry of the Unami tribe of the Lenni Lenape. In their language, "Leni Lenape" means, "the original people". The Acquackanonk sub-tribe were located along the Passaic River. They were part of the Algonquin language family, and known as "Delaware Indians" by the 18th century. They identified themselves with the totem of the Turtle. They were hunter-gatherers, matrilineal, and had cultural traditions such as wedding ceremonies. Northfield Avenue and Old Indian Road in West Orange, remain as original Hackensack trails. Their main settlement was where the city of Hackensack is today. They would travel to the ocean or mountains to hunt for food. The Passaic River runs in an upside-down V shape—8 miles (13 km) west and east, and 13 miles (21 km) north of West Orange. In the centuries prior to industrial development, the Passaic River and Watchung Mountains were major geographic landmarks amidst the untouched wilderness.

West Orange is located at the peak of the Watchung Mountains. This vantage point over the valleys east to Manhattan had a strategic value for Lenni Lenape warriors, and later George Washington's troops during the American Revolution. The wooded South Mountain Reservation has rocks shaped like the backs of large turtles. The area is now known as "Turtle Back Rock Picnic Area" and gives its name to the Turtle Back Zoo. The Turtle Back Rocks were considered sacred to the Native Americans.

The Native Americans were hunter-gatherer tribes who would overlap territories and occasionally had tribal wars, but did not "own" land. They believed in taking only what was immediately necessary from nature, and considering the needs of the next seven generations. This hospitality at first benefited the European settlers, who struggled in the wilderness after reaching North America's shores. In the 1500s and 1600s, the territory was disputed and transferred many times between the Hackensack, Dutch, Scottish, Swedes, and English colonists. Due to the wars between the Native Americans and European settlers, most European settlers stayed East of the Hudson River. In 1664, the English took possession of Dutch New Netherland. On October 28, 1664, The English purchased 780 square miles (2,000 km^{2}) of land from the Hackensack, from Staten Island to the Passaic River on the North to the Raritan River on the South, for about 154 English pounds. This is known as the "Elizabethtown Purchase".

In 1666, Puritan Captain Robert Treat moved south to New Jersey from Connecticut and purchased a tract of land from Governor Carteret, west of the Passaic River and 8 miles (13 km) east of what is currently West Orange. However, the Hackensack tribe disputed this purchase, and said it was not included in the Elizabethtown Purchase. On July 11, 1667, Treat settled the purchase through Samuel Efsal, a Lenni Lenape interpreter. He then founded "New Ark" or Newark, establishing it as a Puritan theocracy, as had been done in Milford, CT. The Newark territory kept extending West as the English overthrew the Dutch and claimed or purchased more Hackensack territory. This expansion was effected primarily by individual property owners, who would purchase tracts of land bit by bit. Sometimes they would name it after themselves or where they were from in Europe. Often the borders were not clearly defined, and few if any maps remain.

In 1678, Anthony Olive became the first European to settle in what is now West Orange. He was of Dutch origin. He started a farm at the base of the mountains—in what is now Llewellyn Park. It was still untouched wilderness. In 1702, New Jersey became a royal colony of England. By 1706 what is now West Orange—was considered part of Essex County in the East Jersey territory.

By the 1700s West Orange was known as part of the Newark Mountains. During the American Revolution, the valleys were populated by farms and mills. The area on Main Street now known as "Tory Corner" was called Williamstown, after two brothers Nathaniel and Benjamin Williams. Nathaniel and his two eldest sons were Loyalists to the British crown, and gathered other Loyalists for meetings. Nathaniel took his eldest sons James and Amos to join the British Army in 1777, and never returned. Meanwhile, Nathaniel's wife Mary Williams stayed on the farm with her younger children. Her farm house had been built in 1720. She gave freely to Washington's revolutionary troops. James finally returned to the farm decades later, to reunite with his mother Mary. Nathaniel and Amos never returned. Nathaniel died of smallpox in New York. A plaque to Mary Williams was erected by the Daughters of the American Revolution in 1922.

West Orange was initially a part of Newark township, and remained so until November 27, 1806, when the territory now encompassing all of The Oranges was detached to form Orange Township. On April 13, 1807, the first government was elected. On January 31, 1860, Orange was incorporated as a town, and on April 3, 1872, it was reincorporated as a city. Almost immediately, Orange began fragmenting into smaller communities, primarily because of local disputes about the costs of establishing paid police, fire and street departments. South Orange was organized on April 1, 1861, Fairmount Township (an independent municipality for less than one year that was later to become part of West Orange) on March 11, 1862, and East Orange on March 4, 1863. West Orange (including what had been the briefly independent municipality of Fairmount) was incorporated as a township on April 10, 1863, and was reformed as a town on February 28, 1900. In 1980, West Orange again became a township to take advantage of federal revenue sharing policies that allocated a greater share of government aid to municipalities classified as townships.

The township derives its name from William III of England or William IV, Prince of Orange, which in turn is derived from the city of Orange.

The Eagle Rock Reservation covers 400 acres (160 ha) in West Orange, Montclair and Verona. It was home to many eagles. It currently is the trail head for the Lenni Lenape Trail. Rock Spring is located at the bottom of the Turtle Back Rocks—currently at the corner of Northfield Avenue and Walker Road, West Orange. The water from the spring was considered to have healing powers since Native American times. By the 19th century, visitors from New York City would come to West Orange to drink the water from this spring for its supposed curative powers. West Orange became a resort or country retreat—with boating, fishing, and an Amusement Park at Crystal Lake near Eagle Rock Reservation. In 1901, the first uphill automobile test took place called the Eagle Rock Hill Climb.

Llewellyn Park, the first planned community in America, is located within West Orange, and was designed by entrepreneur Llewellyn Haskell and architect Alexander Jackson Davis in 1857. Llewellyn Park is considered among the best examples of the "Romantic Landscape" movement of that period.

Thomas Edison was one of the many residents. Thomas Edison's Laboratory, currently a National Historical Park, was where he developed the inventions that earned more than 1,000 patents, including the light bulb, stock ticker and recorded sound. The laboratory grounds also include the Black Maria—America's first movie studio, the birthplace of Hollywood. The whole idea of a movie industry was first born in West Orange. The town's movie industry rapidly began to spreading to surrounding areas. Eventually the industry spread to Fort Lee, New Jersey, in 1907, which offered inexpensive land for movie production studios that could be located in close proximity to New York City. In response to the demands by the Edison Trust for royalties from studios, independent studios located in the Fort Lee area started to relocate to what is now Hollywood, California, where they could operate in good weather year-round, out of reach of Edison and his trust.

In the late 1800s, the Valley region of West Orange was home to 34 hat factories, known as the hat making capital of the country. It is currently under redevelopment as 'Hat City' or 'The Valley Arts District'. Until its closure in 1983, the Orange Quarry Company was located in West Orange, where bluestone was mined.

Post-World War II, there was a real estate development boom in West Orange. In the 1960s, "white flight" from the 1967 Newark riots and Civil Rights Era led to further settlement of West Orange. The 1970 opening of Interstate 280 made West Orange a popular "bedroom community" suburb for commuters to New York City. This coincided with changes to immigration laws re-opening the country to Asian immigration in 1965, and 1980s desegregation of American suburbs. By the 1990s, West Orange had become a "melting pot", home to a diverse and international community. Many of the industries that had made West Orange grow, left the area by the 1960s. This left some urban blight and abandoned warehouses in the Valley, in contrast to wealthy communities on top of the mountains.

It is currently home to Kessler Institute, where actor Christopher Reeve rehabilitated, and Daughters of Israel. It is also home to many Jewish synagogues and Korean churches.

== Geography ==
According to the United States Census Bureau, the township had a total area of 12.13 square miles (31.41 km^{2}), including 12.00 square miles (31.09 km^{2}) of land and 0.12 square miles (0.32 km^{2}) of water (1.01%). It is located approximately 5 miles (8.0 km) west of downtown Newark and 12 miles (19 km) west of New York City. West Orange is in the New York metropolitan area.

The West Branch of the Rahway River originates at Crystal Lake and passes through the township in South Mountain Reservation.

West Orange borders the Essex County communities of Essex Fells, Livingston, Millburn, Maplewood, Montclair, Orange, Roseland, South Orange and Verona.

=== Neighborhoods ===
Unincorporated communities, localities and place names located partially or completely within the township include Crestmont, Crystal Lake, Llewellyn Park, Pleasantdale, and Saint Cloud.

The township has an eclectic mix of neighborhoods and housing types, which roughly correspond to the township's geographic features. Generally, the township has four distinct neighborhoods:

Downtown West Orange and The Valley

The oldest and most densely populated part of the township is Downtown West Orange, which lies in the low basin along the township's eastern border with the city of Orange and Montclair. Main Street, in this section, is home to the Thomas Edison National Historical Park, as well as the municipal building, police headquarters, and a branch post office. The West Orange Public Library is located on Mount Pleasant Avenue in this section, just west of Main Street. Downtown West Orange is laid out in the pattern of a traditional town, and is formed around the western termini of two major east–west arteries of the Newark street grid: Central Avenue and Park Avenue. Downtown West Orange has the most urban character of the township's neighborhoods, while the Valley is home to a growing arts district, the West Orange Arts Center, Luna Stage and a sizable African American community.

The First Mountain

West of Downtown, the neighborhoods of West Orange become increasingly suburban as one ascends the steep hill of the First Watchung Mountain along Northfield, Mount Pleasant, or Eagle Rock Avenue. The housing stock in the neighborhoods of Hutton Park and Gregory is a mixture of Victorian, Jazz Age, and Tudor-style houses; large estates; garden apartments; and post-World War II modern houses. The Victorian enclave of Llewellyn Park, one of America's first planned residential communities, is also located on the First Mountain, having been created in 1853 as a site for country homes for the wealthy from New York City. Many blocks on the First Mountain have sweeping views of the Newark and New York City skylines.

Pleasant Valley and Pleasantdale

Beyond the high ridge traced by Prospect Avenue, West Orange becomes a patchwork of post-World War II suburban neighborhoods, interspersed with pockets of older Victorian homes, as well as golf courses, professional campuses, and shopping centers. Pleasantdale, a walkable business district in this part of the township, includes a number of restaurants, office buildings, stores, and houses of worship. Pleasantdale is also home to a sizable Orthodox Jewish community.

The Second Mountain

Finally, the westernmost section of West Orange lies along the eastern face of the Second Watchung Mountain, and includes large portions of the South Mountain Reservation. The housing stock in this neighborhood resembles that of Pleasantdale, as well as those of the adjacent suburban townships of Millburn and Livingston.

In 2025, controversy grew over plans by Garden Homes, a company owned by the Wilf family, to develop a 500-unit apartment complex with 100 affordable housing units as required under the Mount Laurel doctrine on 30 acres (12 ha) of one of the last remaining forested tracts of land in Essex County, atop the second ridge of the Watchung Mountains at the Canoe Brook headwaters.

== Demographics ==
Historical population
Census	Pop.	Note	%±
1870	2,106		—
1880	3,385		60.7%
1890	4,358		28.7%
1900	6,889		58.1%
1910	10,980		59.4%
1920	15,573		41.8%
1930	24,327		56.2%
1940	25,662		5.5%
1950	28,605		11.5%
1960	39,895		39.5%
1970	43,715		9.6%
1980	39,510		−9.6%
1990	39,103		−1.0%
2000	44,943		14.9%
2010	46,207		2.8%
2020	48,843		5.7%
2024 (est.)	49,211		0.8%
Population sources: 1870–1920 1870 1880–1890; 1890–1910 1900–1930; 1900–1990 2000; 2010 2020

=== 2020 census ===
West Orange township, Essex County, New Jersey – Racial and ethnic composition Note: the US Census treats Hispanic/Latino as an ethnic category. This table excludes Latinos from the racial categories and assigns them to a separate category. Hispanics/Latinos may be of any race.
Race / Ethnicity (NH = Non-Hispanic)	Pop 1990	Pop 2000	Pop 2010	Pop 2020	% 1990	% 2000	% 2010	% 2020
White alone (NH)	33,015	27,907	22,140	19,155	84.43%	62.09%	47.91%	37.68%
Black or African American alone (NH)	2,142	7,672	11,841	13,916	5.48%	17.07%	25.61%	27.31%
Native American or Alaska Native alone (NH)	41	38	80	53	0.10%	0.08%	0.17%	0.10%
Asian alone (NH)	2,140	3,619	3,641	5,523	5.47%	8.05%	7.87%	10.85%
Pacific Islander alone (NH)	N/A	13	9	18	N/A	0.03%	0.02%	0.04%
Some Other Race alone (NH)	37	120	142	436	0.09%	0.27%	0.31%	0.86%
Mixed Race or Multi-Racial (NH)	N/A	1,060	867	2,095	N/A	2.36%	1.88%	4.12%
Hispanic or Latino (any race)	1,728	4,514	7,487	9,647	4.42%	10.04%	16.19%	18.97%
Total	39,103	44,943	46,207	48,843	100.00%	100.00%	100.00%	100.00%

=== 2010 census ===
The 2010 United States census counted 46,207 people, 16,790 households, and 11,753 families in the township. The population density was 3,836.0 per square mile (1,481.1/km^{2}). There were 17,612 housing units at an average density of 1,462.1 per square mile (564.5/km^{2}). The racial makeup was 57.15% (26,406) White, 26.58% (12,284) Black or African American, 0.38% (174) Native American, 7.96% (3,680) Asian, 0.02% (10) Pacific Islander, 4.82% (2,227) from other races, and 3.09% (1,426) from two or more races. Hispanic or Latino residents of any race were 16.20% (7,487) of the population.

Of the 16,790 households, 33.4% had children under the age of 18; 53.1% were married couples living together; 12.7% had a female householder with no husband present and 30.0% were non-families. Of all households, 25.5% were made up of individuals and 12.6% had someone living alone who was 65 years of age or older. The average household size was 2.70 and the average family size was 3.28.

23.7% of the population were under the age of 18, 7.1% from 18 to 24, 25.7% from 25 to 44, 27.6% from 45 to 64, and 15.9% who were 65 years of age or older. The median age was 40.6 years. For every 100 females, the population had 88.3 males. For every 100 females ages 18 and older there were 83.2 males.

The Census Bureau's 2006–2010 American Community Survey showed that (in 2010 inflation-adjusted dollars) median household income was $88,917 (with a margin of error of +/− $4,480) and the median family income was $106,742 (+/− $5,256). Males had a median income of $65,854 (+/− $4,548) versus $43,223 (+/− $2,769) for females. The per capita income for the township was $43,368 (+/− $2,021). About 4.9% of families and 7.1% of the population were below the poverty line, including 8.5% of those under age 18 and 7.5% of those age 65 or over.

=== 2000 census ===
As of the 2000 United States census there were 44,943 people, 16,480 households, and 11,684 families residing in the township. The population density was 3,708.7 inhabitants per square mile (1,431.9/km^{2}). There were 16,901 housing units at an average density of 1,394.7 per square mile (538.5/km^{2}). The racial makeup of the township was 67.6% White, 17.5% African American, 0.14% Native American, 8.09% Asian, 0.04% Pacific Islander, 3.52% from other races, and 3.20% from two or more races. Hispanic or Latino residents of any race were 10.04% of the population.

There were 16,480 households, out of which 32.2% had children under the age of 18 living with them, 56.0% were married couples living together, 11.2% had a female householder with no husband present, and 29.1% were non-families. 24.6% of all households were made up of individuals, and 11.6% had someone living alone who was 65 years of age or older. The average household size was 2.66 and the average family size was 3.19. In the township the population was spread out, with 23.3% under the age of 18, 6.2% from 18 to 24, 29.7% from 25 to 44, 23.4% from 45 to 64, and 17.4% who were 65 years of age or older. The median age was 39 years. For every 100 females, there were 88.6 males. For every 100 females age 18 and over, there were 84.0 males.

The median income for a household in the town was $69,254, and the median income for a family was $83,375. Males had a median income of $52,029 versus $39,484 for females. The per capita income for the township was $34,412. About 4.6% of families and 5.6% of the population were below the poverty line, including 6.0% of those under age 18 and 7.8% of those age 65 or over.

== Economy ==
Developed by Sol Atlas, Essex Green Shopping Center is an outdoor mall with stores that include ShopRite, restaurants and an AMC Theatres Fork and Screen dine-in movie theater. The 350,000-square-foot (33,000 m^{2}) mall, the largest of its type in Essex County, was purchased in 2016 by Clarion Partners.

== Sports ==
The Jersey Rockhoppers hockey team of the Eastern Professional Hockey League, formed for the 2008–09 season, played home games at the Richard J. Codey Arena. The arena also used to be the practice facility for the New Jersey Devils from 1986 to 2007. The New Jersey Daredevils, a special needs hockey team formed in 2002 that plays in the SHI (Special Hockey International League), uses the arena for home games and practices. Annually in October, the Daredevils host a Halloween themed tournament for Special Hockey International teams (including the Daredevils themselves) called Frankenfest. Frankenfest has been going on every October since 2009. The New Jersey Devils Youth Hockey team also plays here as well.

== Parks and recreation ==
The township is set off by two large parks: the South Mountain Reservation along its southwestern borders with Maplewood, Millburn and South Orange, and the Eagle Rock Reservation along its northeastern borders with Montclair and Verona. The township straddles the transition between the low-lying Newark Bay basin and the high terrain of the Watchung Mountains. Fishing and kayaking is available on the Rahway River.

== Landmarks and places of interest ==
- Thomas Edison National Historical Park
- Turtle Back Zoo
- South Mountain Reservation
- Eagle Rock Reservation and 9/11 Memorial
- Empty Cloud Monastery

== Government ==
=== Local government ===
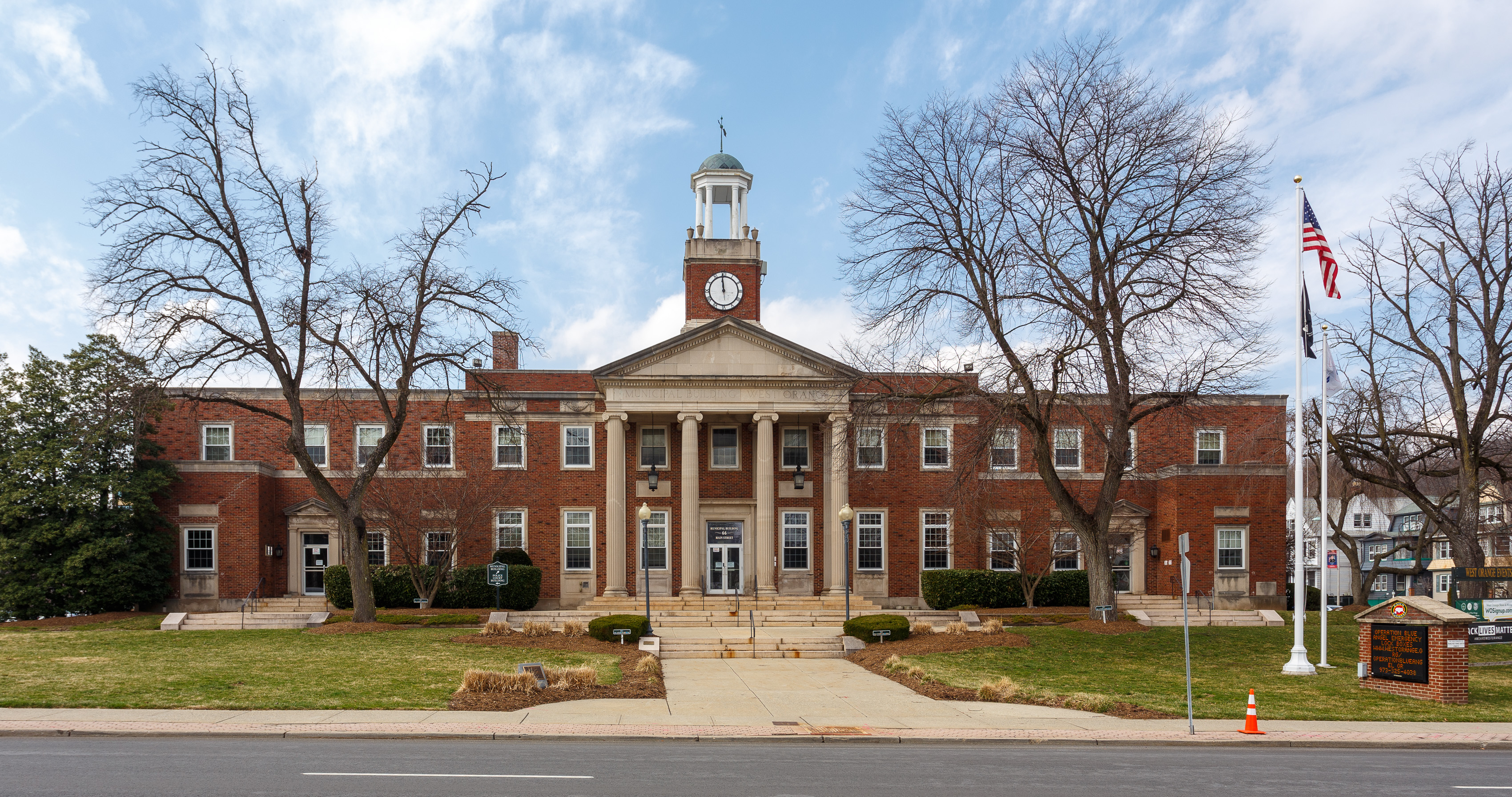
West Orange Municipal Building at Main Street and Mount Pleasant Avenue

West Orange is governed by Plan B of the Mayor-Council system of municipal government pursuant to the Faulkner Act, as implemented on July 1, 1962, by direct petition. The township is one of 71 municipalities (of the 564) statewide that use this form of government. The governing body is comprised of a mayor and a five-member township council. The mayor is directly elected to a four-year term. Each member of the council is elected to a four-year term of on a staggered basis, with either three council seats or two seats and the mayoral seat up for election in even-numbered years. Township elections are nonpartisan, with all seats chosen on an at-large basis. In December 2013, the Township Council approved an ordinance that shifted municipal elections from May to the November general election, citing savings from the combined elections estimated as much as $100,000 per cycle.

As of 2025, the Mayor of West Orange is Susan McCartney, whose term of office ends December 31, 2026. Members of the Township Council are Michelle Casalino (2028), Tammy Williams (2026), Joe Krakoviak (2028), Joyce L. Rudin (2028) and Susan Scarpa (2026).

In September 2015, the Township Council selected Michelle Casalino to fill the seat expiring in December 2016 that had been held by Patty Spango until her resignation from office. On November 8, 2016, Councilwoman Casalino was elected to a four-year term.

==== Municipal court ====
Officers of the municipal court as of 2014 were:

- Dennis Dowd – Chief Judge
- Dawn Donahue – Municipal Judge
- Joseph Wenzel – Municipal Prosecutor
- Joseph Deer – Public Defender

=== Federal, state, and county representation ===
West Orange is split between the 10th Congressional District and is part of New Jersey's 27th state legislative district.

Prior to the 2010 Census, West Orange had been split between the 8th Congressional District and the 10th Congressional District, a change made by the New Jersey Redistricting Commission that took effect in January 2013, based on the results of the November 2012 general elections. In the redistricting that took effect in 2013, 18,122 residents in the eastern third of the township were placed in the 10th district, while 28,085 residents in the western portion of the township were placed in the 11th District.

For the 119th United States Congress, New Jersey's 10th congressional district is represented by LaMonica McIver (D, Newark). New Jersey is represented in the United States Senate by Democrats Cory Booker (Newark, term ends 2027) and Andy Kim (Moorestown, term ends 2031).

For the 2026–2027 session, the 27th legislative district of the New Jersey Legislature is represented in the State Senate by John F. McKeon (D, West Orange) and in the General Assembly by Rosy Bagolie (D, Livingston) and Alixon Collazos-Gill (D, Montclair).

Essex County is governed by a directly elected county executive, with legislative functions performed by the Board of County Commissioners. As of 2025, the County Executive is Joseph N. DiVincenzo Jr. (D, Roseland), whose four-year term of office ends December 31, 2026. The county's Board of County Commissioners is composed of nine members, five of whom are elected from districts and four of whom are elected on an at-large basis. They are elected for three-year concurrent terms and may be re-elected to successive terms at the annual election in November. Essex County's Commissioners are:

Robert Mercado (D, District 1 – Newark's North and East Wards, parts of Central and West Wards; Newark, 2026), A'Dorian Murray-Thomas (D, District 2 – Irvington, Maplewood and parts of Newark's South and West Wards; Newark, 2026), Vice President Tyshammie L. Cooper (D, District 3 - Newark: West and Central Wards; East Orange, Orange and South Orange; East Orange, 2026), Leonard M. Luciano (D, District 4 – Caldwell, Cedar Grove, Essex Fells, Fairfield, Livingston, Millburn, North Caldwell, Roseland, Verona, West Caldwell and West Orange; West Caldwell, 2026), President Carlos M. Pomares (D, District 5 – Belleville, Bloomfield, Glen Ridge, Montclair and Nutley; Bloomfield, 2026), Brendan W. Gill (D, at large; Montclair, 2026), Romaine Graham (D, at large; Irvington, 2026), Wayne Richardson (D, at large; Newark, 2026), Patricia Sebold (D, at-large; Livingston, 2026).

Constitutional officers elected countywide are: Clerk Christopher J. Durkin (D, West Caldwell, 2025), Register of Deeds Juan M. Rivera Jr. (D, Newark, 2029), Sheriff Amir Jones (D, Newark, 2027), and Surrogate Alturrick Kenney (D, Newark, 2028).

=== Politics ===
As of March 2011, there were a total of 30,561 registered voters in West Orange, of which 14,166 (46.4%) were registered as Democrats, 3,273 (10.7%) were registered as Republicans and 13,108 (42.9%) were registered as Unaffiliated. There were no voters registered to other parties.

United States presidential election results for West Orange
Year	Republican		Democratic		Third party(ies)	
Year	No.	%	No.	%	No.	%
2024	5,623	23.15%	18,265	75.19%	405	1.67%
2020	5,519	21.14%	20,347	77.95%	237	0.91%
2016	5,201	23.17%	16,757	74.66%	487	2.17%
2012	5,950	27.88%	15,214	71.29%	177	0.83%
2008	6,667	29.97%	15,423	69.34%	154	0.69%
2004	7,118	34.16%	13,535	64.95%	186	0.89%

In the 2012 presidential election, Democrat Barack Obama received 71.3% of the vote (15,214 cast), ahead of Republican Mitt Romney with 27.9% (5,950 votes), and other candidates with 0.8% (177 votes), among the 21,491 ballots cast by the township's 32,061 registered voters (150 ballots were spoiled), for a turnout of 67.0%. In the 2008 presidential election, Democrat Barack Obama received 67.8% of the vote (15,423 cast), ahead of Republican John McCain with 29.3% (6,667 votes) and other candidates with 0.7% (154 votes), among the 22,740 ballots cast by the township's 30,260 registered voters, for a turnout of 75.1%. In the 2004 presidential election, Democrat John Kerry received 64.7% of the vote (13,535 ballots cast), outpolling Republican George W. Bush with 34.0% (7,118 votes) and other candidates with 0.7% (186 votes), among the 20,933 ballots cast by the township's 28,418 registered voters, for a turnout percentage of 73.7.

Gubernatorial election results for West Orange
Year	Republican		Democratic		Third party(ies)	
Year	No.	%	No.	%	No.	%
2025	4,102	20.40%	15,908	79.10%	100	0.50%
2021	3,259	22.36%	11,219	76.96%	100	0.69%
2017	2,234	20.40%	8,384	76.57%	331	3.02%
2013	4,863	42.89%	6,350	56.01%	125	1.10%
2009	4,530	33.17%	8,168	59.81%	958	7.02%
2005	3,896	29.59%	8,960	68.04%	312	2.37%

In the 2013 gubernatorial election, Democrat Barbara Buono received 56.0% of the vote (6,350 cast), ahead of Republican Chris Christie with 42.9% (4,863 votes), and other candidates with 1.1% (125 votes), among the 11,580 ballots cast by the township's 32,390 registered voters (242 ballots were spoiled), for a turnout of 35.8%. In the 2009 gubernatorial election, Democrat Jon Corzine received 59.3% of the vote (8,168 ballots cast), ahead of Republican Chris Christie with 32.9% (4,530 votes), Independent Chris Daggett with 6.2% (858 votes) and other candidates with 0.7% (100 votes), among the 13,773 ballots cast by the township's 29,898 registered voters, yielding a 46.1% turnout.

United States Senate election results for West Orange1
Year	Republican		Democratic		Third party(ies)	
Year	No.	%	No.	%	No.	%
2024	4,995	21.41%	17,630	75.56%	707	3.03%
2018	3,608	22.20%	12,185	74.98%	457	2.81%
2012	4,653	25.05%	13,538	72.88%	385	2.07%
2006	3,850	29.71%	8,951	69.08%	156	1.20%

United States Senate election results for West Orange2
Year	Republican		Democratic		Third party(ies)	
Year	No.	%	No.	%	No.	%
2020	5,180	20.37%	19,853	78.05%	402	1.58%
2014	2,748	23.22%	8,894	75.14%	195	1.65%
2013	2,230	24.78%	6,705	74.51%	64	0.71%
2008	5,278	27.92%	13,323	70.47%	305	1.61%

== Education ==
The West Orange Public Schools serves students in pre-kindergarten through twelfth grade. As of the 2019–20 school year, the district, comprised of 12 schools, had an enrollment of 6,718 students and 632.5 classroom teachers (on an FTE basis), for a student–teacher ratio of 10.6:1. Schools in the district (with 2019–20 enrollment data from the National Center for Education Statistics) are Betty Maddalena Early Learning Center (with 71 students in Pre-K), Gregory Elementary School (454 students; in grades K–5), Hazel Avenue Elementary School (320; K–5), Kelly Elementary School (455; Pre-K–5), Mount Pleasant Elementary School (353; K–5), Redwood Elementary School (509; K–5), St. Cloud Elementary School (356; K–5), Washington Elementary School (417; K–5), Thomas A. Edison Middle School (516; 6), Liberty Middle School (536; 7–8), Roosevelt Middle School (487; 7–8) and West Orange High School (2,098; 9–12). Pleasantdale School was renamed Kelly School in May 2016 in honor of Mark and Scott Kelly, identical twins who attended the school starting in second grade before becoming NASA astronauts.

Seton Hall Preparatory School is a Roman Catholic all boys' high school that operates under the supervision of the Archdiocese of Newark. Founded in 1856 on the campus of Seton Hall University, the school moved to West Orange in 1985.

Golda Och Academy is a private Jewish day school that offers secular and religious education for Jewish children from pre-kindergarten through twelfth grade at two campuses in West Orange.

== Transportation ==
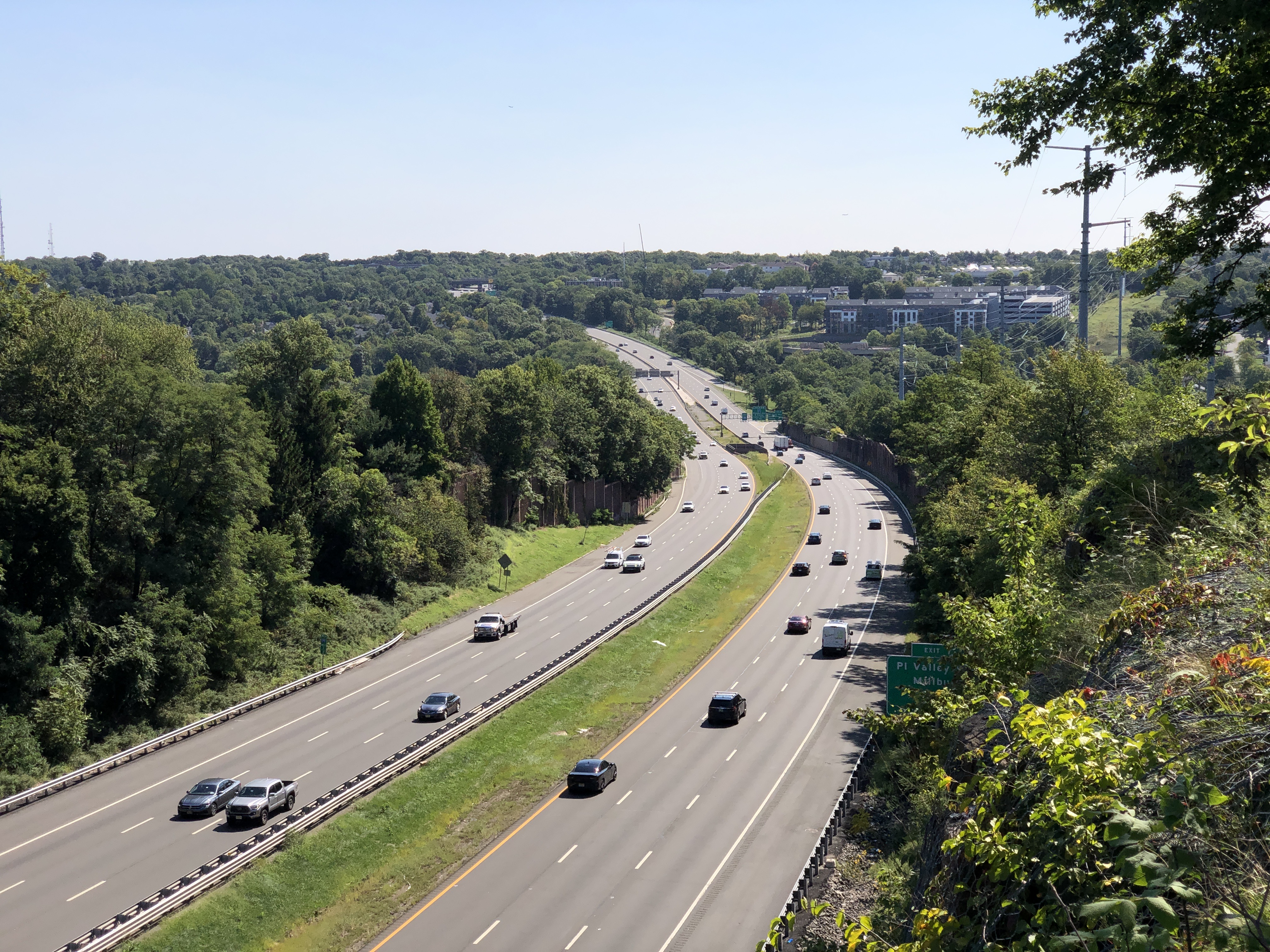
Interstate 280 eastbound in West Orange

=== Roads and highways ===
As of May 2010, the township had a total of 114.54 miles (184.33 km) of roadways, of which 89.63 miles (144.25 km) were maintained by the municipality, 19.45 miles (31.30 km) by Essex County and 5.46 miles (8.79 km) by the New Jersey Department of Transportation.

Interstate 280 is the main limited access road that passes through from east to west. Route 10 passes through in the western area and has its eastern terminus at CR 577 (which runs north–south through the township). CR 508 traverses the municipality from east to west.

=== Public transportation ===
NJ Transit offers bus service in the township to Newark on the 21, 29, 71, 73 and 79 routes, with local service on the 97 route. NJT also offers service to Port Authority Bus Terminal in New York City with the 101 route. In September 2012, as part of budget cuts, NJ Transit suspended service to Newark on the 75 line.

Coach USA / Community Coach serves the Port Authority Bus Terminal on route 77. OurBus operates a commuter route to New York City serving Livingston and West Orange.

The township offers a jitney service that operates on weekdays, offering service to the Brick Church, Orange and South Orange train stations.

== Mass media and telecommunications ==
Thomas Edison's Black Maria, the first movie studio ever, was located on Main Street and Lakeside Avenue. From the late 1960s/early–1970s until the early 1990s UHF TV channel 68 maintained their offices, studios, and transmitter at 416 Eagle Rock Avenue. After Channel 68 moved to West Market Street in Newark, and their transmitter to the Empire State Building in Manhattan, NBC owned and operated stations WNBC-TV Channel 4 and WPXN-TV Channel 31 (NBC later sold its interest in WPXN's parent Paxson Communications) moved into the Eagle Rock Avenue complex operating backup transmitter facilities in case of a catastrophic event such as the destruction of their main transmitters at the World Trade Center which occurred during the September 11 terrorist attacks. West Orange was formerly the home of two religious radio stations, WFME 1560AM licensed to New York City and WFME 106.3FM licensed to Mount Kisco, New York, and one now-defunct non-commercial station WNYJ-TV licensed to West Milford, New Jersey, all owned by Family Stations, Inc., WFME-FM formerly operated on 94.7 until its sale to Cumulus Media in 2012 and renamed WNSH. In late 2020, Family Radio permanently closed its West Orange studios and began to operate from their transmitter facilities, WFME-AM in Maspeth, Queens in New York (In February 2021 the AM station ceased broadcasting temporarily after the land the transmitter was on was sold) and WFME-FM near Bedford, New York. WFMU 91.1FM formerly owned by Upsala College now owned by Auricle Communications has their transmitter towers on Marcella Avenue. Verizon Communications, going as far back as the mid to late 1950s and early 1960s when it was New Jersey Bell, operated an analog central office and later fiber optics facilities on Prospect Avenue near the Essex Green Shopping Center and a fiber optics and satellite transmitter facility which was originally owned and operated by MCI Inc. until it was acquired by Verizon in 2006.

== In popular culture ==
- In the HBO crime drama The Sopranos, West Orange is the location of Livia Soprano's retirement home, Green Grove. The township was also used in various other episodes as the series was largely filmed on location in North Jersey.
- The song Pleasant Valley Sunday by Carole King and Gerry Goffin and turned hit by The Monkees, whose version peaked at #3 on the Billboard Hot 100, was inspired by West Orange's Pleasant Valley Way, a long thoroughfare that spans the majority of the town before becoming Lakeside Ave in Verona
- In the 2009 action-comedy film Paul Blart: Mall Cop, the titular character lives in West Orange and works at the (fictional) West Orange Pavilion Mall.
- The McClure Twins are identical twins and YouTube personalities.

== Notable people ==
People who were born in, residents of, or otherwise closely associated with West Orange include:

- Joyce Anderson (1923–2014), woodworker and furniture designer
- Nat Adderley Jr. (born 1955), music arranger who spent much of his career with Luther Vandross
- Treena Livingston Arinzeh (born 1970), biomedical engineer and professor known for her work researching adult stem-cell therapy
- Mike Austin (born 1943), swimmer who represented the United States at the 1964 Summer Olympics in Tokyo and won a gold medal in the 4 × 100 m freestyle relay
- Ben Barres (1954–2017), neuroscientist at Stanford University and advocate for underrepresented groups in science, including women, members of the LGBT community and people of color
- Ronald Bell (1951–2020), musician with Kool & the Gang
- John L. Blake (1831–1899), politician who represented New Jersey's 6th congressional district from 1879 to 1881
- Enea Bossi Sr. (1888–1963), aviation pioneer who created the first stainless steel aircraft and one of the first human-powered planes
- Martin Brodeur (born 1972), ice hockey goaltender in the NHL with the New Jersey Devils
- Anna Easter Brown (1879–1957), part of the original nine group of founders in the Alpha Kappa Alpha sorority
- Joanna Bruno (born 1944), operatic soprano
- Brendan Byrne (1924–2018), Governor of New Jersey from 1974 to 1982
- Jean Byrne (1926–2015), educator who served as the First Lady of New Jersey from 1974 to 1982 during the tenure of her former husband, two-term Governor Brendan Byrne
- Elliot Cadeau (born 2004), basketball point guard who attends the University of North Carolina at Chapel Hill
- David Cassidy (1950–2017), teen idol, singer and actor who appeared on the 1970s TV series The Partridge Family
- Joan Caulfield (1922–1991), movie, theatre, television actress of the 1940s, 1950s and 1960s
- James Ormsbee Chapin (1887–1975), artist
- Bill Charlap (born 1966), jazz pianist
- Chris Christian (born 1989), professional soccer player who played as a defender for Oakland Roots SC in the National Independent Soccer Association
- Mary Jo Codey (born 1955), healthcare activist and former First Lady of New Jersey
- Richard Codey (1946–2026), state senator who served as acting governor of New Jersey in 2002 and as governor from 2004 until 2006 (Now resides in neighboring Roseland)
- Jemima Condict (1754–1779), American Revolutionary War era diarist
- Brandon Costner (born 1987), professional basketball forward for Caciques de Humacao of the Baloncesto Superior Nacional
- Cicely Cottingham, artist
- Anthony Criss (born 1970), member of the rap group Naughty by Nature
- Charles Cullen (born 1960), former nurse and serial killer who confessed to killing 40 people
- Alexander Jackson Davis (1803–1892), architect who helped create Llewellyn Park
- John J. Degnan (born 1944), Attorney General of New Jersey from 1978 until 1981 who was chosen as chairman of the Port Authority of New York and New Jersey
- Frank J. Dodd (1938–2010), politician who served as president of the New Jersey Senate from 1974 to 1975
- Joe Dooley (born 1965), head men's basketball coach of the East Carolina University Pirates
- Billy Drummond (born 1959), jazz drummer
- Ginny Duenkel (born 1947), winner of a Gold and Bronze medal in two swimming events at the 1964 Summer Olympics in Tokyo, Japan Ginny Duenkel Municipal Pool is named in her honor.
- Charles Edison (1890–1969), United States Secretary of the Navy 1940, Governor of New Jersey 1941 to 1944 and son of Thomas Edison
- Theodore Miller Edison (1898–1992), only child of his inventor father who graduated from college; went on to become an inventor with over 80 patents
- Thomas Alva Edison (1847–1931), inventor of the phonograph, the incandescent electric lightbulb and the first practical motion picture camera, whose home was Glenmont Mansion. Edison's Black Maria, the first movie studio, was located in West Orange
- Marion Eppley (1883–1960), physical chemist
- Michael W. Farrell (born 1938), Senior Judge of the District of Columbia Court of Appeals
- Eugenio Fernandi (1922–1991), tenor with the Metropolitan Opera who rose to prominence in the late 1950s and 1960s, receiving 22 curtain calls for his performance in Lucia di Lammermoor
- Leo Fitzpatrick (born 1978), actor
- Alisa Flatow (1975–1995), victim of the Egged bus 36 bombing
- Alan Flusser (born 1945), men's clothing designer
- Rich Galen (born 1946), columnist, political strategist and former press-secretary to Vice President Dan Quayle and Speaker of the House Newt Gingrich
- GDP, hip-hop recording artist
- Chris Gethard (born 1980), comedian, TV show host of The Chris Gethard Show, author of Weird New York and an associate editor of the Weird NJ publications
- John J. Giblin (1909–1975), labor leader and Democratic Party politician who served one term in the New Jersey Senate
- Whoopi Goldberg (born 1955), comedian, actress, talk show host
- Maclyn Goldman (1901–1977), politician who served in the New Jersey Senate
- Raymond E. Goldstein (born 1961), Professor of Complex Physical Systems at the University of Cambridge
- Allan Gorman (born 1947), visual art professional best known for his photorealistic paintings of industrial objects
- Alen Hadzic (born 1991), former épée fencer who was banned for life from the sport
- Llewellyn F. Haskell (1842–1929), United States Army officer and a Union general during the American Civil War
- Eldridge Hawkins Jr. (born 1979), former Mayor of Orange, New Jersey
- Maya Hayes (born 1992), soccer player who has played for Sky Blue FC of the National Women's Soccer League
- Roger Headrick (born 1936), business executive who served as president of the Minnesota Vikings of the National Football League from 1991 to 1998
- Robert Hebble (1934–2020), composer, arranger and organist
- Will Hill (born 1990), safety for the Baltimore Ravens
- Kyrie Irving (born 1992), professional basketball player for the Brooklyn Nets of the National Basketball Association
- Ja Rule (born 1976), rapper
- Marcus Jackson (born 2008), soccer player who plays for the UCLA Bruins men's soccer team
- Jennifer Jones (born 1967), dancer and actress, who in 1987 became the first African American Radio City Music Hall Rockette
- Belmar Joseph (born 2005), footballer who plays as a midfielder for FC Sion
- Philip D. Kaltenbacher (born 1937), former chairman and CEO of Seton Company and a former chairman of the Port Authority of New York and New Jersey
- Mark Kelly (born 1964), former NASA astronaut who is United States Senator from Arizona
- Scott Kelly (born 1964), NASA astronaut
- Gus Keriazakos (1931–1996), MLB pitcher
- Paul J. Kern (born 1945), commanding general of the United States Army Materiel Command from 2001 to 2004
- Carole King (born 1942) and Gerry Goffin (1939–2014), husband-and-wife songwriting team who resided off Pleasant Valley Way in the mid-1960s along with other songwriters, a location that gave rise to the song "Pleasant Valley Sunday", recorded by the Monkees in 1967
- Hailey Kops (born 2002), Israeli pair skater
- Bettye LaVette (born 1946), soul singer who released her first record at age 16 and found success with I've Got My Own Hell to Raise at age 59 in 2005
- Barbara F. Lee (born 1945), philanthropist
- Georgia Mason (1910–2007), botanist and author
- Nick Massi (1927–2000), bass singer and bass guitarist for the Four Seasons
- Joshua D. Maurer (born 1964), film producer, writer and actor whose credits include Georgia O'Keeffe, The Hoax, The Last Tycoon, Rosemary's Baby, Jodi Arias: Dirty Little Secret and Introducing Dorothy Dandridge
- George B. McClellan (1826–1885), major general and briefly general-in-chief of the Union Army during the Civil War who ran as a Democrat against Lincoln in the presidential election of 1864 and went on to become Governor of New Jersey (1878–1881)
- John F. McKeon (born 1958), member of the New Jersey General Assembly representing the 27th Legislative District who served as Mayor of West Orange from 1998 to 2010
- Joseph Minish (1916–2007), represented New Jersey's 11th congressional district in the United States House of Representatives
- Ken Murray (1928–2008), professional basketball player
- Gordon Allen Newkirk Jr. (1928–1985), astrophysicist who studied the solar corona
- Charles W. Nichols (1875–1959), businessman who constructed the Pleasantdale Chateau
- Rebecca Odes (born 1969), media entrepreneur, author and musician, who was the bassist and vocalist for the band Love Child and co-founded the website Gurl.com
- Okieriete Onaodowan (born 1987), actor who originated the roles of Hercules Mulligan and James Madison in the 2015 Broadway musical Hamilton
- Michael Oren (born 1955), former Israeli ambassador to the United States
- Fred Ott (1860–1936), an employee of Thomas Edison's in the 1890s who "starred" in two of the earliest surviving motion pictures – Edison Kinetoscopic Record of a Sneeze (a.k.a. Fred Ott's Sneeze) and Fred Ott Holding a Bird – both filmed in 1894
- Robert Pearlman (born 1976), founder and editor of collectSPACE
- Michael Pitt (born 1981), actor who was in Murder by Numbers, Hedwig and the Angry Inch, and Last Days, as well as HBO's Boardwalk Empire
- Nicholas H. Politan (1935–2012), attorney who served as a United States district judge of the United States District Court for the District of New Jersey
- Vinnie Politan (born 1965), co-anchor of In Session on the cable network truTV
- Ann Probert (born 1938), golfer
- Paul C. Reilly (1890–1984), architect who designed many buildings for Catholic clients and for several Manhattan theaters
- John Renna (1920–1998), politician who served as Commissioner of the New Jersey Department of Community Affairs
- Stuart Risch, United States Army major general who serves as the Deputy Judge Advocate General of the United States Army
- Phil Rizzuto (1917–2007), nicknamed "The Scooter", played shortstop for the New York Yankees from 1941 to 1956
- Ta'Quan Roberson (born 2000), American football quarterback for the Buffalo Bulls
- Marc Roberts (born 1959), entrepreneur, sports manager, real estate developer and businessman
- Brandon Scoop B Robinson (born 1985), NBA analyst
- Douglas Robinson Jr. (1855–1918), businessman who was married to Corinne Roosevelt Robinson, the sister of U.S. President Theodore Roosevelt and the aunt of First Lady Eleanor Roosevelt
- Douglas Robinson Sr. (1824–1893), businessman and banker
- Vin Rock (born 1970), rapper for group Naughty by Nature
- Peter W. Rodino (1909–2005), United States Congressman from 1949 to 1989
- Hilary Rosen (born 1958), former chairman and CEO of the Recording Industry Association of America and CNN political analyst
- Jeffrey Rosen, founder, chairman and owner of Triangle Financial Services and the owner of the Maccabi Haifa basketball team
- Renee Rosnes (born 1962), jazz pianist
- Sherry Ross (born c. 1954), sportscaster and journalist
- Marge Roukema (1929–2014), politician who represented New Jersey in the U.S. House of Representatives from 1981 to 2003
- Johnny Sansone (born 1957), electric blues singer, songwriter, harmonicist, accordionist, guitarist and piano player
- Lyndsey Scott (born 1984), model, iOS mobile app software developer and actress
- Walter H. Seward (1896–2008), super-centenarian, lived to 111 years
- Edward S. Shapiro (born 1938), historian of American history and American Jewish history who is a retired professor from Seton Hall University
- Marc B. Shapiro (born 1966), professor and author of various books and articles on Jewish history, philosophy and theology
- Alfredo Silipigni (1932–2006), conductor
- Eve Slater (born 1945), physician who served as the United States Assistant Secretary for Health and Human Services under President George W. Bush, from 2002 to 2003
- Amos Alonzo Stagg (1862–1965), known as "The Grand Old Man" of college football. During the founding year of the College Football Hall of Fame, he was inducted as both a player and a coach. He was among the first group of inductees into the Basketball Hall of Fame in 1959. He is also credited with the invention of the batting cage in baseball and the tackling dummy in football. West Orange's Stagg Field playground is named in his honor. Ranked #4 on the Sports Illustrated list of The 50 Greatest New Jersey Sports Figures
- Andy Stern (born 1950), former president of the Service Employees International Union
- Edwin Stern (born 1941), lawyer and judge who served as acting justice on the New Jersey Supreme Court
- Gregory J. Studerus (born 1948), prelate of the Roman Catholic Church who has been serving as an auxiliary bishop for the Archdiocese of Newark
- Isaiah J. Thompson (born 1995), jazz pianist, bandleader and composer
- Mike Trainor (born 1981), comedian
- David Twersky (1950–2010), journalist, Zionist activist and peace advocate in Israel and the U.S., who was an editor for The Forward and The New York Sun and a leader of the American Jewish Congress
- Brandon Uranowitz (born 1986), stage and screen actor best known for his roles as Adam Hochberg in the musical An American in Paris and as Mendel Weisenbachfeld in the 2016 Broadway revival of Falsettos
- Alberto Vilar (born 1940), former investment manager
- Stephen Vittoria (born 1957), filmmaker and author
- Milton Waldor (1924–1975), politician who represented Essex County in the New Jersey State Senate from 1968 to 1972
- Evelyn Ward (1923–2012), actress, mother of David Cassidy
- Charlotte Fowler Wells (1814–1901), phrenologist and publisher
- DJ Whoo Kid (born 1972), official DJ of G-Unit
- Kenneth T. Wilson (born 1936), politician who served in the New Jersey General Assembly from 1968 to 1972
- Scott Wolf (born 1968), actor who is best known as "Bailey Salinger" on the TV series Party of Five
- Ian Ziering (born 1964), actor who is best known for the role of Steve Sanders on the TV series Beverly Hills, 90210
- Abner Zwillman (1899–1959), mobster found hanging dead at his home at 50 Beverly Road
- PlaqueBoyMax (born 2003), online streamer
