= Kenneth T. Wilson =

American politician (born 1936)

Kenneth Thomas Wilson (born March 20, 1936) is an American Republican Party politician who served in the New Jersey General Assembly from 1968 to 1972.

== Biography ==
Wilson was born on March 20, 1936, in Newark, New Jersey, the son of Kenneth and Margie Wilson. He graduated from West Orange High School and Upsala College with a B.S. in education. He worked as a social studies teacher at East Orange High School.

In 1967, at age 35, Wilson became a candidate for the New Jersey General Assembly in Essex County District 11D. He won the Republican primary on a ticket with former East Orange Council Chairman Donald MacArt. MacArt was the top vote getter with 3,978 votes, and Wilson received 3,817. They defeated Alfred J. Sansone (3,025) and Ruth E. Hardy (2,959). In the general election, Wilson was the top vote getter with 19,281 votes, followed by Democrat Frank J. Dodd (who later served as Senate President and was a candidate for governor in 1981) with 19,101. MacArt, with 17,845, and Democrat Thomas H. Cooke, Jr., a future mayor of East Orange, with 17,816, were defeated. Wilson won re-election to a second term in 1969, and was again the top vote getter with 28,233. His running mate, Republican assemblyman John N. Dennis, defeated Dodd by 874 votes, 27,890 to 27,016. Democrat William J. Fusco ran fourth with 24,658 votes.

In 1971, following legislative redistricting, Wilson lost his seat in a close contest to Democrats Eldridge Hawkins and Peter G. Stewart. Hawkins received 18,896 votes, followed by Stewart (18,877), Republican John F. Trezza (18,864), and Wilson (18,695).

As an assemblyman, Wilson served as chairman of the Assembly Air and Water Pollution and Public Health Committee, and as chairman of the Assembly Transportation and Public Utilities Committee. He also served as chairman of the Autonomous Authorities Study Committee.

New Jersey General Assembly
Preceded by Constituency established	Member of the New Jersey General Assembly from the 11D district January 9, 1968–January 13, 1970; Served alongside: Frank J. Dodd	Succeeded by Herbert Rinaldi; David Goldfarb
Preceded by Herbert Rinaldi	Member of the New Jersey General Assembly from the 11E district January 13, 1970–January 11, 1972; Served alongside: John N. Dennis	Succeeded by Thomas Kean; Philip D. Kaltenbacher
