= Peter Stewart (politician) =

American politician

Peter G. Stewart is an American Democratic Party politician who served as mayor of Caldwell, New Jersey in the 1960s and 1970s, was a member of the Essex County, New Jersey Board of Chosen Freeholders and was elected to the New Jersey General Assembly from Assembly District 11D in 1971. He was the General Counsel to the New Jersey Democratic State Committee. An attorney, he was a partner at Carella, Byrne, Cecchi, Olstein, Brody and Agnello, P.C., the law firm of former New Jersey Governor Brendan Byrne. He is a graduate of St. Peter's College and Seton Hall University School of Law.

Stewart ran for Assemblyman in 1971 with Eldridge Hawkins in Essex County District 11D. Stewart and Hawkins defeated Robert Detore, East Orange City Councilman Ben Sweetwood, and Calvin C. Reed, Sr. in the Democratic primary. In the general election, Hawkins received 18,896 votes, followed by Stewart (18,877), Republican John F. Trezza (18,864), and Republican Assemblyman Kenneth T. Wilson (18,695). He did not seek re-election in 1973. He was elected Essex County Freeholder in 1977, seeking a one-year unexpired term. He was not a candidate for Freeholder for a full term in 1978.

New Jersey General Assembly
Preceded by Herbert Rinaldi; David Goldfarb	Member of the New Jersey General Assembly from the 11D district January 11, 1972–January 8, 1974; Served alongside: Eldridge Hawkins	Succeeded by Constituency abolished
