= Condict =

Condict is a surname. Notable people with the surname include:

- Jemima Condict (1754–1779), American Revolutionary War era diarist
- Lewis Condict (1772–1862), politician
- Silas Condict (1738–1801), New Jersey delegate to the Continental Congress
- Ira Condict (1764–1811), the third President of Queen's College (now Rutgers University)

== See also ==
- Edward Faitoute Condict Young, banker
