= Stephen Vittoria =

American filmmaker and author (born 1957)

Stephen Vittoria (born January 11, 1957) is an American filmmaker and author born in Newark, New Jersey who currently resides in Los Angeles, California.

== Early life ==
Vittoria grew up in West Orange, New Jersey and attended West Orange Mountain High School. In 1973, when he was a 16-year-old high school student, Vittoria petitioned to run for the Board of Education of the West Orange Public Schools. Vittoria wanted student representation on the school board but was denied candidacy. With legal representation from the American Civil Liberties Union, the case went to the Supreme Court of the United States where Justice William J. Brennan, Jr. ruled against Vittoria and the ACLU.

Vittoria graduated Rider University, Lawrenceville, NJ in 1979 and Columbia College, Los Angeles, California 1981, where he studied film.

== Career ==
=== Film ===
In 1987, Vittoria wrote and directed his first feature film, Lou, Pat & Joe D (later titled Black & White), starring Frank Vincent and Kim Delgado. Set in Newark, NJ after World War II, about racism and the friendship of two young boys. In 1995, Vittoria produced, wrote, and directed Hollywood Boulevard, starring John C. McGinley, Jon Tenney, and Julianne Phillips—a dark satire of the motion picture business. In 1996, Vittoria founded Street Legal Cinema, a documentary production company, and Deep Image, a commercial production company.

In 2005, Vittoria produced, wrote, and directed the documentary feature film, One Bright Shining Moment: The Forgotten Summer of George McGovern, which won the Jury Prize for "Best Documentary Feature" at the 2005 Sarasota Film Festival and was released in theaters nationwide by First Run Features. In 2006, Vittoria wrote, directed, and edited the television documentary Keeper of the Flame with journalist Linda Ellerbee and actor Wilford Brimley, about ecological threats to American forests. In 2008 and 2011, respectively, Vittoria was segment producer on Gonzo: The Life and Work of Dr. Hunter S. Thompson and Magic Trip: Ken Kesey's Search for a Kool Place, both directed by Alex Gibney.

In 2012, Vittoria produced, wrote, directed, and edited the feature documentary Mumia: Long Distance Revolutionary, released nationally by First Run Features and internationally by Monoduo Films Berlin. The film documents the career of imprisoned journalist Mumia Abu-Jamal, before and during incarceration.

=== Publications ===
In 2018, Vittoria and co-author Mumia Abu-Jamal published volume one of a three-part book series entitled, Murder Incorporated: Empire, Genocide, and Manifest Destiny. The nonfiction series covers the history of the United States of America, from the arrival of Europeans to the early 21st century, making the argument that the founding and evolution of America as a nation has been driven primarily by conquest, exploitation, and murder.

Volume one in the series, Dreaming of Empire, features an introduction by journalist Chris Hedges and deals with the early origins of the "American Empire." America's Favorite Pastime and Perfecting Tyranny, were released in 2019 and 2021, respectively. America's Favorite Pastime covers America's major wars (World War I, World War II, the Vietnam War) and Perfecting Tyranny covers economic and political systems.
