= Robert Hebble =

American composer, arranger, and organist (1934–2020)

Robert Christian Hebble (February 14, 1934 - February 17, 2020) was an American composer, arranger, and organist. He worked as a voluntary assistant to the organist Virgil Fox.

== Life ==
One of two children born to Christian and Elizabeth Hebble, Hebble grew up in West Orange, New Jersey and graduated West Orange High School. He earned a bachelor of music degree from Yale University and a master's degree from the Juilliard School, where he studied with Vittorio Giannini and Roger Sessions.

Hebble composed in various genres, and arranged many of the pieces recorded by Virgil Fox.

== Works ==
=== Organ music ===
==== Original compositions ====
- A Symphony of Light
- Haec Dies Resurgam
- Festival Fanfare (published by H.T. FitzSimons Company)
- Rejoice ! 14 Improvisations on Hymn Melodies
  - Toccatino on Rico Tino (based on "Festal song")
- Near the cross (published by Lorenz Publishing Company)
  - Ah, Holy Jesus
  - In the cross of Christ I glory (tune Herzliebster Jesu)
  - Jesus, Keep Me Near the Cross (tune Near the cross)
  - My song is love unknown (tune Rhosymedre)
  - What Wondrous Love Is This (tune Wondrous Love)
  - When I survey the wondrous cross (tune Hamburg)
- The Crystal Cathedral Organ Collection - 12 pieces for the Hazel Wright Organ
  - Celebration
  - Diptych (based on "Orientis Partibus")
  - Heraldings (dedicated to Dr. and Mrs. Robert Schuller)
  - Meditation on "My shepherd will supply my need"
  - Nave (based on "Divinum Mysterium")
  - Toccata on "Old Hundredth"
  - Pastel
  - Prelude on "I Wonder as I Wander"
  - Psalm prelude
  - Schematics (based on "Ton y botel" and "Ebenezer")
  - Seven palette sketches of Utrillo
    - I - Rue des Saints-Pères
    - II - Lapin agile sous la neige
    - III - L'église Saint-Séverin
    - IV - Paris, vu du Square Saint-Antoine
    - V - L'église Boissy-Saint-Antoine
    - VI - La chapelle de Beaulieu
    - VII - Crépuscule, Golfe du Morbihan
  - Soft Stillness and the Night
- Cathedral of commerce (commissioned by the Friends of the Wanamaker Organ for the 2011 centenary of the organ in the Philadelphia department store.)

==== Arrangements ====
- Amazing Grace
- By arrangement only
  - Siciliano, from Sonata n°2 for flute, by J.S. Bach
  - Lament of Dido, from Dido & Aeneas, by H. Purcell
  - Dialogo per organo, from L'organo Suonarino, by A. Banchieri
  - Pavane, from Ma Mère l'Oye, by M. Ravel
  - Little litanies of Jesus, by G. Grouvlez
  - Sospiri, by E. Elgar
  - In the garden (based on the tune "Garden"), by C. Austin Miles
  - Christmas, Variations on "Adeste fidelis", by G. Dethier
  - Northern lights, by S. Karg-Elert
  - Vergin, tutto amor, by F. Durante
  - Liebestod, from Tristan & Isolde, by R. Wagner
  - Prayer, from Sea Shell, by C. Engel
  - Prelude to Act III, from Tristan & Isolde, by R. Wagner
- Hear the angels sing, artistic carol settings for organ
  - We Three Kings Of Orient Are
  - Silent Night, Holy Night
  - O Jesu Sweet, O Jesu Mild
  - Away In A Manger
  - Joseph Dearest, Joseph Mine
  - Of the Father's Love Begotten
  - It Came Upon the Midnight Clear
  - O Little Town of Bethlehem
- Ted Alan Worth in concert
  - Symphonia No 29, by Johann Sebastian Bach
  - Romanza, by Edvard Grieg
  - Winter Night, by Frederick Delius
  - Homage to Fritz Kreisler (based on "Londonderry Air")

=== Hymns ===
- Hymnal Companion For Organ (free accompaniments and modulations with original hymns in organ score)
- For the Masses (published by Sacred Music Press)
  - Sing of Mary
  - Hail, Holy Queen, Enthroned Above (Salve Regina Coelitum)
  - At the cross her station keeping (Stabat Mater Dolorosa)
  - Hail, Holy Queen, enthroned above (Salve Regina Coelitum)
  - Come, Holy Ghost, Creator Blest
- Favorite Hymns for Organ (published by Alfred Music)
  - Abide with Me
  - Fairest Lord Jesus
  - Joyful, Joyful We Adore Thee
