= Anna Easter Brown =

American sorority founder (1879–1957)

- Born: April 13, 1879; West Orange, New Jersey, United States
- Died: March 5, 1957 (aged 77); Rocky Mount, North Carolina, U.S.
- Occupations: original founder of Alpha Kappa Alpha sorority; History teacher
- Parent(s): Beverly Brown and Lawrie Brown

Anna Easter Brown (April 13, 1879 – March 5, 1957) was a part of the original nine group of sixteen founders in Alpha Kappa Alpha sorority. It was the first sorority founded by African-American women students. It has had a continuing legacy of generating social capital for over 100 years.

Brown also completed graduate work at Columbia University. As an educator at the high school level in North Carolina for nearly 42 years, she had a critical role in teaching the next generations. With her outstanding qualifications, she maintained a high academic standard. Brown also developed exhibits to teach the community about African-American history. She helped found the YWCA in Rocky Mount, North Carolina, and expanded Alpha Kappa Alpha by founding a local chapter.

== Early life ==
Born West Orange, New Jersey, Brown was the daughter of Beverly and Lawrie Brown. She graduated from West Orange High School in 1897, with honors. She was well-prepared for Howard University, the top historically black college in the nation. It was a time when only 1/3 of 1% of African Americans and 5% of whites of eligible age attended any college.

== Founding of Alpha Kappa Alpha ==
At Howard University, Brown worked as the chief evening librarian while she completed classes at the Teachers College Department. On January 15, 1908, Brown along with fifteen other women helped to found Alpha Kappa Alpha Sorority. Brown served as the first treasurer of the sorority. She also composed a sorority song. She helped write the final draft of the sorority's constitution and bylaws. During the planning sessions, she documented the sorority's history for the future. Brown graduated in 1909 with a B.Ed.

== Teaching and later life ==
Brown completed further graduate study at Columbia University. After graduation, Brown worked at Bricks School in Bricks, North Carolina, from 1909 to 1926. During her time in Bricks, she also traveled nationally and wrote articles for the National Urban League's magazine Opportunity.

In 1925 Brown moved to Rocky Mount, North Carolina, and continued her career in education. She worked as a history teacher at Booker T. Washington High School in Rocky Mount for nearly 30 years, from 1926 until 1952.

Brown was a charter member of the Chi Omega chapter in Rocky Mount, North Carolina, in 1925, when she also served as president of the chapter. She was also a founding member of Rocky Mount's YWCA.

Brown promoted community learning about Negro History by developing local exhibits, which she arranged annually. Her twenty-sixth exhibit received national coverage. Brown died on March 5, 1957, aged 77.
