= Gordon Allen Newkirk Jr. =

American astrophysicist

- Born: September 12, 1928; Orange, New Jersey
- Education: Harvard University, A.B. 1950 (Astronomy); University of Michigan, M.A. 1952, Ph.D. 1953 (Astrophysics)
- Spouse: Nancy Buck
- Children: Sally Bruton, Linda Newkirk, Jennifer Newkirk
- Scientific career
- Fields: Astronomy
- Workplaces: 1955-1979 High Altitude Observatory, Boulder and Climax, Colorado; 1956-1965 University of Colorado, Department of Astro-Geophysics; 1965-1985 University of Colorado, Department of Physics and Astrophysics; 1968-1979 Associate Director, National Center for Atmospheric Research
- Thesis: "Carbon Monoxide in the Solar Atmosphere"

Gordon Allen Newkirk Jr. (September 12, 1928 – December 21, 1985) was an American astrophysicist.

Newkirk was born in Orange, New Jersey, and grew up in nearby West Orange, living there throughout his youth until he left for college. He was the only child of Mildred (née Fleming) and Gordon Allen Newkirk, who worked as an electrical engineer for Public Service Electric and Gas. West Orange was the home of the Edison Laboratories and Newkirk grew up near the home of Thomas Edison in Llewellyn Park. He attended West Orange High School.

He graduated from Harvard University in 1950 and completed his Ph.D. in astrophysics from the University of Michigan in 1953. In 1955 he began working at the High Altitude Observatory in Boulder, Colorado. From 1968 through 1979, he was director of the High Altitude Observatory (HAO) and associate director of NCAR. He was also a teacher and adjunct professor at the University of Colorado in the Department of AstroGeophysics and the Department of Physics and Astrophysics. He married Nancy Buck in 1956, and raised three daughters in Boulder, Colorado.

Coronascope IIa, Gordon Newkirk, Lee Lacey, Bob Lee, Dave Bohlin, Howard Hull.

== Scientific career ==
His scientific career was notable for his work as a solar physicist, in particular for his design of instruments for observing the solar corona. His radially-graded coronal camera (first used in Bolivia in 1966) was also used to photograph seven other eclipses. He perfected the Lyot coronagraph over a period of twenty years for use as a space borne telescope. In 1973, he was the principal investigator for experiments on the Skylab spacecraft (while working for HAO). He published many papers on the solar corona, including "a benchmark depiction of coronal magnetic fields." He also discovered a comet.
