= Eldridge Hawkins =

American politician (born 1940)

Eldridge Hawkins (born September 4, 1940) is an American lawyer and Democratic Party politician who served in the New Jersey General Assembly from 1972 to 1978. During that time he served as the Chairman of the Assembly's Judiciary, Law, Public Safety and Defense Committee. In that capacity he authored The NJ Legislature's NJ Code of Criminal Justice known as Title 2C. During his tenure he also sponsored NJ's Affirmative Action Law.

Hawkins was born in East Orange, New Jersey. He graduated from Rutgers University in 1962 with a BA in Political Science and from Seton Hall Law School with a Juris Doctor degree in 1966. Hawkins was one of the first six attorneys in The General Counsel's Office of the Equal Employment Opportunity Commission under President Lyndon Johnson in Washington DC during 1966 -1967, until the outbreak of the Newark riots when he became the head attorney of the Springfield Ave. Office of Newark Legal Services. He then became the Director of Monmouth County Legal Services.

Hawkins is a lawyer, and served from 1970 to 1972 as the city prosecutor of East Orange. In 1971, Hawkins was elected to the District 11D of the New Jersey General Assembly at the age of 31, along with his running mate, Caldwell mayor Peter Stewart. In 1973, Hawkins ran for the Assembly in the 26th District with Richard Codey and Frank J. Dodd for the New Jersey Senate, with all three winning seats. In the 1977 Democratic primary for the Senate seat, Hawkins and tennis star Althea Gibson challenged incumbent Frank J. Dodd, who had the support of Essex County Democratic organization under County Chairman Harry Lerner. With Gibson and Hawkins splitting the anti-organization vote, Dodd won the nomination and the subsequent general election.

In 1975, at the request of then New Jersey Governor Brendan Byrne, who was reviewing a request to issue executive clemency for Rubin Carter and John Artis, both convicted of a triple-murder case in Paterson, on June 17, 1966. Hawkins, assisted by investigator Prentiss Thompson, issued "The Rubin 'Hurricane' Carter and John Artis Investigation" concluding that the triggermen were not Carter and Artis, but Eddie Rawls and Elwood Tuck, predominantly based upon one witness's recollection of the murders, after the first trial of Carter and Artis.

As an Attorney, Hawkins has set legal precedents in various areas of the law primarily dealing with people's civil rights (Hawkins v. Harris; Ptaszynski v. Ehiri Uwaneme; Hellams v. Essex County Welfare Board; Roy Victor v. NJ State Police).

Hawkins was the founding President of the Garden State Bar Association, NJ's Minority Bar, a member of the Essex County Ethics Committee of the Supreme Court and the recipient of many awards including being the first recipient of Seton Hall Law School's Thurgood Marshall Award

His son, Eldridge Hawkins, Jr., was elected as mayor of Orange, New Jersey in 2008.

His daughter is actress/producer/writer Hillary Hawkins.

Hawkins is married to Jet publicist and businesswoman Linda Cofer Hawkins a trail blazer for African American women in the Miss New Jersey/Miss America Pageant. (Publication: Asbury Park Press i Location: Asbury Park, New JerseyIssue Date: Sunday, May 2, 1971Page: Page 16 Asbury Park Press from Asbury Park, New Jersey on May 2, 1971 · Page 16) "Atlanticville" Oct.14 through Oct. 20,1993, page 26 "Linda Cofer Hawkins - Miss America Trailblazer" by Vivian Martin

New Jersey General Assembly
| Preceded by Herbert Rinaldi; David Goldfarb | Member of the New Jersey General Assembly from the 11D district January 11, 1972–January 8, 1974; Served alongside: Peter Stewart | Succeeded by Constituency abolished |
| Preceded by Constituency established | Member of the New Jersey General Assembly from the 26th district January 8, 1974–January 10, 1978; Served alongside: Richard Codey | Succeeded by Mildred Barry Garvin |
