= John N. Dennis =

American politician (born 1933)

John N. Dennis (born February 25, 1933) is an American Republican Party politician and business executive who served in the New Jersey General Assembly from 1968 to 1974, and again from 1976 to 1978 representing the 27th Legislative District.

== Early life and education ==
Born in East Orange, New Jersey, Dennis was a graduate of Montclair High School and Lehigh University, and served in the U.S. Army from 1954 to 1956. Dennis was an executive in his family business, Annin & Co., one of the nation's largest flagmakers.

== Elected office ==
A resident of Verona, New Jersey, he was elected to the New Jersey State Assembly in 1967, running in 11th Legislative DistrictDistrict 11E]], covering parts of Essex County. He was the top vote getter in the Republican primary with 7,189 votes, followed by Herbert Rinaldi with 7,066 votes. They defeated Beatrice Carlson of Montclair (5,065) and Joseph Napolitano (4,812). In the general election, Dennis and Rinaldi defeated Democrats Ralph G. Conte and John T. Regan.

Legislative redistricting in 1969 placed three incumbents in two Assembly seats: Dennis, Republican Kenneth T. Wilson, and Democrat Frank J. Dodd. Wilson and Dennis won, with 28,233 and 27,890 votes, respectively. His victory over Dodd was just 874 votes, 27,890 to 27,016. Democrat William J. Fusco ran fourth with 24,658 votes. Dodd would later return to the Assembly, move up to the Senate, serve as New Jersey Senate President and seek the Democratic nomination for Governor of New Jersey in 1981.

After Rinaldi declined to seek re-election in 1971, Dennis ran with Republican Carl Orechio. They defeated Democrats Peter A. Torre Jr. and David W. Conrad, by more than 7,500 votes.

Dennis lost his bid for re-election to a fourth term in the Democratic landslide of 1973, running in the newly created 27th Legislative District, which included northern Essex County suburbs of Nutley, Montclair, Bloomfield, Glen Ridge, Verona, Caldwell, Essex Fells and Cedar Grove. In the general election, Orechio was narrowly re-elected, 27,395 votes to 26,877 votes, against Democrat James J. Mills of Glen Ridge. The top vote getter in that race was Democrat Robert M. Ruane with 28,465 votes. Dennis finished fourth with 25,764 votes.

In 1975, Dennis mounted a successful comeback bid, defeating Ruane 26,471 to 23,404. Orechio finished first with 26,773, and Democrat Herbert Lev finished fourth with 18,886 votes.

Dennis decided to run for the New Jersey Senate in 1977, taking on one-term Democrat Carmen Orechio, Carl Orechio's brother. He won 78% of the vote in the Republican primary against Francis M. Adams, but lost the general election to Orechio by 918 votes, 25,773 (51%)to 24,855 (49.%).

New Jersey General Assembly
Preceded by Constituency established	Member of the New Jersey General Assembly from the 11-E district January 9, 1968–January 11, 1972; Served alongside: Herbert Rinaldi (1968–1970), Kenneth T. Wilson (1970–1972)	Succeeded by Thomas Kean; Philip D. Kaltenbacher
Preceded by Ralph R. Caputo; C. Richard Fiore	Member of the New Jersey General Assembly from the 11-C district January 11, 1972–January 8, 1974; Served alongside: Carl Orechio	Succeeded by Constituency abolished
Preceded by Robert M. Ruane	Member of the New Jersey General Assembly from the 27th district January 13, 1976–January 10, 1978; Served alongside: Carl Orechio	Succeeded by Buddy Fortunato
