= Vinnie Politan =

American attorney and journalist (born 1965)

- Born: Vincent Joseph Politan; February 4, 1965 (age 61); West Orange, New Jersey, U.S.
- Education: B.A., Stanford University; J.D., Seton Hall University
- Occupations: Television anchor and analyst; attorney
- Employer: Court TV
- Known for: Legal commentary
- Children: 5

Vinnie Politan

Vincent Joseph "Vinnie" Politan (born February 4, 1965) is a former New Jersey county prosecutor, practicing private attorney and broadcast journalist. He serves as lead anchor of Court TV. He hosts and created the primetime show, Closing Arguments with Vinnie Politan, which is the highest rated primetime program on the network.

Previously, he co-created and hosted After Dark, a hit show on HLN which featured an in studio jury. It was the network's highest premiering show in its history. Before that he anchored "Prime News with Vinnie Politan" on HLN and HLN Special Report. He co-anchors In Session on the cable network truTV. He previously co-anchored Bloom & Politan: Open Court (alongside Lisa Bloom) and Both Sides (with Kimberly Guilfoyle).

Trials covered by Politan include those of or connected to Jodi Arias, Trayvon Martin, Casey Anthony, Johnny Depp, Alex Murdaugh, Sean "Puffy" Combs, O. J. Simpson, Scott Peterson, Kobe Bryant, Darrell Brooks, and Kyle Rittenhouse among many others, since joining Court TV in January 2001. Additionally, Politan hosted the morning radio show Me and Vinnie on Sirius XM radio's Stars Too station.

Politan remained at HLN until 2014, when he declined a contract offer from the HLN Network. In August 2014, he joined the morning broadcast of Atlanta's local NBC Affiliate WXIA, "11 Alive", as lead anchor for the morning weekday news.

== Biography ==
Born in New Jersey on Thursday, February 4, 1965, Politan was raised in West Orange, New Jersey, and graduated from West Orange High School, where he was captain of the school's basketball team both his junior and senior year - leading the squad to back to back conference championships and a state sectional championship. He attended Stanford University in Palo Alto, California, receiving an AB in Communication before attending Seton Hall University School of Law in Newark, New Jersey.

== Career ==
Politan’s first job was in 1988 when he co-owned with Jerry Salerno the Metropolitan Recording Corporation, a label he would later revive. The son of federal judge Nicholas H. Politan and brother of a corporate attorney, Politan was a prosecutor in Bergen County, New Jersey, before going into journalism. Following his time as prosecutor, Politan worked in the private legal sector, including at the Carella-Byrne law firm in New Jersey. Politan's final employment as an attorney was as in-house counsel for the supermarket chain Grand Union.

=== Journalism ===
Politan worked at Channel 10 News in New Jersey as a reporter and anchor, covering general news, legal stories, and moderating political debates. He also produced and hosted a weekly legal program, Bergen County Justice with Vinnie Politan. Politan worked as an AP reporter and then an anchor for Central Florida News 13 in Orlando. In 2000, he covered both Democratic and Republican National Conventions as a correspondent for Time Warner. After his departure from HLN in July 2014, Politan became an anchor of Atlanta's NBC affiliate, "11 Alive". He hosted the "Late Feed" on WXIA, a late night show featuring local newsmakers, headlines and intense legal coverage, for which he won an Emmy Award. In 2018, Politan agreed to become the lead anchor on Court TV, which relaunched in May 2019.
