= Marcus Jackson (soccer) =

American soccer player (born 2008)

Personal information
- Full name: Marcus Jackson
- Date of birth: March 29, 2008 (age 18)
- Place of birth: West Orange, New Jersey, U.S.
- Height: 6 ft 4 in (1.93 m)
- Position: Defender

Team information
- Current team: UCLA Bruins
- Number: 19

Youth career
- 2021–2023: Red Raiders
- 2024–2026: Ironbound SC
- 2023–2026: West Orange Mountaineers

College career
Years	Team	Apps	(Gls)
2026–	UCLA Bruins	4	(0)

Marcus Jackson (born March 29, 2008) is an American soccer player who plays college soccer for UCLA. Jackson is the 2026 recipient of the Gatorade High School Soccer Player of the Year Award, an annual award for the best high school athletes in the nation.

== Career ==
=== Youth and high school ===
Jackson was raised in Essex County, New Jersey, where he played club soccer in MLS Next Pro for Red Raiders FC and Ironbound SC. In addition to club soccer, Jackson also played high school soccer for his alma mater, West Orange High School. During his senior year of high school, Jackson captained the Mountaineers and led the program to a 22–2–0 season record that culminated with NJSIAA Group IV state championship, the high school's first state title in boys' soccer since 2013. Jackson scored 18 goals and added five assists across all competitions during the fall 2025 season.

Jackson was awarded the Gatorade High School Soccer Player of the Year Award in June 2026.

=== College ===
Ahead of the 2026 NCAA Division I men's soccer season, Jackson signed a National Letter of Intent to play collegiate soccer for UCLA.
