= West Orange High School (New Jersey) =

High school in Essex County, New Jersey, US

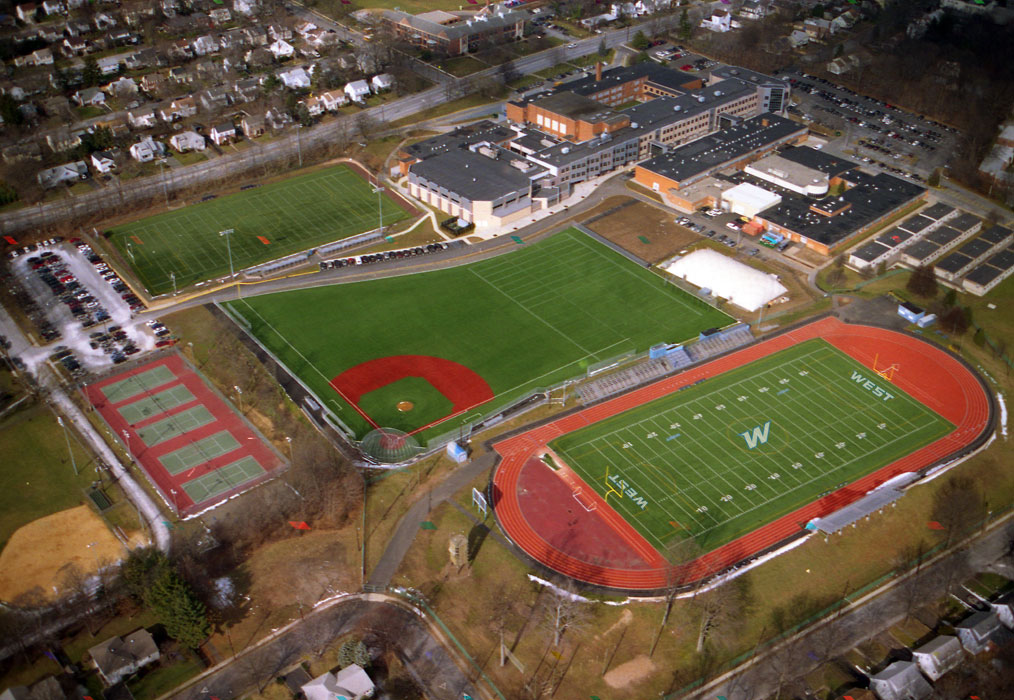

Location
- 51 Conforti Avenue; West Orange, Essex County, New Jersey 07052; United States; 40.806666°N 74.259999°W

Information
- Type: Public high school
- Established: 1898
- School district: West Orange Public Schools
- NCES School ID: 341761002468
- Principal: Oscar Guerrero
- Faculty: 192.7 FTEs
- Grades: 9-12
- Enrollment: 2,208 (as of 2023–24)
- Student to teacher ratio: 11.5:1
- Colors: Cobalt; Navy Blue; Light Grey
- Athletics conference: Super Essex Conference (general); North Jersey Super Football Conference (football)
- Team name: Mountaineers
- Website: wohs.woboe.org

West Orange High School (WOHS) is a comprehensive four-year community public high school, serving students in ninth through twelfth grades from West Orange in Essex County, in the U.S. state of New Jersey. Since the closure of West Orange Mountain High School, WOHS is the only secondary school serving the West Orange Public Schools. West Orange High School has been accredited by the New Jersey Department of Education and by the Middle States Association of Colleges and Schools Commission on Elementary and Secondary Schools since 1928.

As of the 2023–24 school year, the school had an enrollment of 2,208 students and 192.7 classroom teachers (on an FTE basis), for a student–teacher ratio of 11.5:1. There were 762 students (34.5% of enrollment) eligible for free lunch and 205 (9.3% of students) eligible for reduced-cost lunch.

== Curriculum ==
In addition to basic academic courses offered at different ability levels, there are Honors and Advanced Placement courses in most subjects. Programs in business education, technical and industrial education, computer education, performing and fine arts, and English as a Second Language are also offered. The Cooperative Education Program provides students with the opportunity to study academics as well as receive on-the-job training.

== History ==
The high school was built in 1898 on Gaston Street in West Orange but was burned down in 1913. It was rebuilt, and was relocated to a new building on Northfield Avenue in 1922. The old building became Gaston Street Junior High School (Fairmount Elementary School was built behind it) and was torn down in 1972. The current facility was built in 1960 as Mountain High School. In 1984, the 1922 building was sold to become Seton Hall Preparatory School, a private Catholic school. Mountain High School and the adjoined Abraham Lincoln Junior High School were converted into the existing facility. In 2004, a new building was added, doubling the size of the school. As of February 19, 2021, the athletic complex includes a football field, one soccer field, one softball field, an outdoor basketball court, one 80-yard field, five tennis courts, and a baseball field.

== Awards, recognition and rankings ==
In the 2011 "Ranking America's High Schools" issue by The Washington Post, the school was ranked 44th in New Jersey and 1,379th nationwide.

The school was the 170th-ranked public high school in New Jersey out of 339 schools statewide in New Jersey Monthly magazine's September 2014 cover story on the state's "Top Public High Schools", using a new ranking methodology. The school had been ranked 136th in the state of 328 schools in 2012, after being ranked 128th in 2010 out of 322 schools listed. The magazine ranked the school 114th in 2008 out of 316 schools. The school was ranked 98th in the magazine's September 2006 issue, which surveyed 316 schools across the state.

For the 1998–99 school year, West Orange High School was named a "Star School" by the New Jersey Department of Education, the highest honor that a New Jersey school can achieve.

West Orange High School applied for, and was awarded, a Dodge Grant for the 2004–05 academic year through Montclair State University. The focus of the grant is to explore how to develop a Conflict Resolution program responsive to the needs of West Orange High School. The Dodge Grant Team spent a year researching and developing a potential Conflict Resolution Model for West Orange High School.

== Athletics ==
The West Orange High School Mountaineers compete in the Super Essex Conference, which is comprised of public and private high schools in Essex County and was established following a reorganization of sports leagues in Northern New Jersey by the New Jersey State Interscholastic Athletic Association (NJSIAA). Before the NJSIAA's 2010 realignment, the school had competed in the Northern Hills Conference an athletic conference comprised of public and private high schools located in Essex, Morris and Passaic counties. With 1,574 students in grades 10-12, the school was classified by the NJSIAA for the 2019–20 school year as Group IV for most athletic competition purposes, which included schools with an enrollment of 1,060 to 5,049 students in that grade range. The football team competes in the Liberty White division of the North Jersey Super Football Conference, which includes 112 schools competing in 20 divisions, making it the nation's biggest football-only high school sports league. The school was classified by the NJSIAA as Group V North for football for 2024–2026, which included schools with 1,317 to 5,409 students.

The boys' basketball team won the Group III state championship in 1936 (defeating Millville Memorial High School in the tournament final) and won the Group IV title in 1949 (vs. Emerson High School). The 1935 team defeated Millville by a score of 35-24 to win the Group III state finals in the title game played at Rutgers University.

The ice hockey team won the Gordon Cup in 1961 (as co-champion) and won the Monsignor Kelly Cup in 2004.

The boys' swimming team won the Division B state championship in 1963.

The boys' baseball team won the North II Group III state championship in 1967 and won the Group III state title in 1971 (against runner-up Bridgewater-Raritan High School East in the final of the playoffs).

The girls' tennis team won the Group IV state championship in 1984 (defeating Cherry Hill High School East in the final match of the tournament), 1985 (vs. Ridgewood High School) and 1986 (vs. Cherry Hill High School East); the team lost to Red Bank Catholic High School in the finals of the Tournament of Champions in both 1984 and 1985, before defeating Red Bank Catholic in 1986 to win the overall state championship.

The school's marching band, the Marching Mountaineers, were three-year United States Scholastic Band Association (USSBA) Group V Open State Champs (2005, 2006, 2009), USSBA Group V Open Northern State Champs (2009), and ninth in the northeastern region as of 2007 BOA (Bands of America). In addition, their Color Guard is nationally known for their "globe-tossing" performance.

The boys' soccer team won the Group IV state championship in 2006 (defeating Manalapan High School in the tournament final) and 2013 (vs. Clearview Regional High School). The 2006 boys' soccer team finished the season with a 24–1 record; the team was ranked 4th in the nation at the beginning of the 2006 season and finished 17th in the NSCAA/Adidas National Rankings. The 2006 team won the Group IV state championship with a 4–1 win over Bridgewater-Raritan High School in the semifinals and a 3–0 win against Manalapan High School in the finals. The team finished the 2013 season with a 13-7-2 record, after winning the Group IV title with a 1-0 win against Clearview Regional High School in the championship game.

The school hosted a match in 2007 between a team representing the New York Athletic Club and teams from Russia and Romania. The NYAC team beat Russia 14–11 in free style and Romania 14–12 in Greco-Roman matches.

The boys' wrestling team won the North I Group IV state sectional championship in 2012 and the North I Group V title in 2018.

In 2025, Marcus Jackson was named National High School Soccer Player of the Year by United Soccer Coaches, after he led the Mountaineers to a 24–2 record and captured the 2025 NJSIAA Group IV state championship, defeating North Brunswick by a score of 5–0.

== Administration ==
The school's principal is Oscar Guerrero. His administration team includes three assistant principals.

== Notable alumni ==
Notable alumni of West Orange High School and West Orange Mountain High School include:

- Anna Easter Brown (1879-1957, class of 1897), founder of Alpha Kappa Alpha sorority
- Brendan Byrne (1924–2018, class of 1942), former governor of New Jersey
- Chris Christian (born 1989), professional soccer player who currently plays as a defender for Oakland Roots SC in the National Independent Soccer Association
- Charles Cullen (born 1960, class of 1978), nurse and convicted serial killer, who murdered multiple hospital patients, at least 29 of which have been confirmed
- PlaqueBoyMax (born 2003, class of 2021), online streamer, record producer and rapper
- Ginny Duenkel (born 1947), gold medalist in the 400 meter freestyle at the 1964 Summer Olympics in Tokyo
- Chris Gethard (born 1980), actor and comedian
- Benedict Gross (born 1950), mathematics professor
- Robert Hebble (1934–2020), composer, arranger and organist
- Marcus Jackson (born 2008, class of 2026), soccer player who plays for the UCLA Bruins men's soccer team
- Mark Kelly (born 1964), United States Senator from Arizona who is a former NASA astronaut and is the identical twin of Scott Kelly
- Scott Kelly (born 1964), astronaut and identical twin of Mark Kelly
- General Paul J. Kern (born 1945), commanding general of the United States Army Materiel Command from 2001–2004
- Joshua D. Maurer (born 1964), film producer, writer and actor whose credits include Georgia O'Keeffe, The Hoax, The Last Tycoon, Rosemary's Baby, Jodi Arias: Dirty Little Secret and Introducing Dorothy Dandridge
- John F. McKeon (born 1958), politician who has served in the New Jersey General Assembly since 2002, where he represents the 27th Legislative District
- Gordon Allen Newkirk Jr. (1928–1985), astrophysicist
- Rebecca Odes (born 1969), media entrepreneur, author and musician, who was the bassist and vocalist for the band Love Child and co-founded the website Gurl.com
- Okieriete Onaodowan (born 1987, class of 2005), actor who originated the roles of Hercules Mulligan and James Madison in the 2015 Broadway musical Hamilton
- Michael Oren (born 1955), served as Israeli Ambassador to the United States
- Vinnie Politan (born 1965, class of 1983), anchor, talk show host for Court TV and radio host for Sirius Satellite Radio
- Marge Roukema (1929–2014, class of 1947), politician who represented New Jersey in the U.S. House of Representatives from 1981 to 2003
- Johnny Sansone (born 1957), electric blues singer, songwriter, harmonicist, accordionist, guitarist and piano player
- Elizabeth Shin (1980–2000), MIT student who died from burns inflicted by a fire in her dormitory room. Her death resulted in the upgrading of MIT's counseling services
- Andy Stern (born 1950, class of 1968), former President of the Service Employees International Union
- Stephen Vittoria (born 1957), filmmaker and author, who ran for the district's board of education while a student in 1973
- Kenneth T. Wilson (born 1936), politician who served in the New Jersey General Assembly from 1968 to 1972
- Scott Wolf (born 1968, class of 1986), actor best known for playing the role of Bailey Salinger on Party of Five
- Ian Ziering (born 1964, class of 1982), actor best known for appearing as Steve Sanders on Beverly Hills, 90210

== In popular culture ==
A fifth-season episode of the HBO series The Sopranos titled "The Test Dream" shows Tony Soprano in a dream scene with his high school football coach, Mr. Molinero. The school letters "W.O.H.S." are shown on a jacket in the coach's office.

== Gallery ==
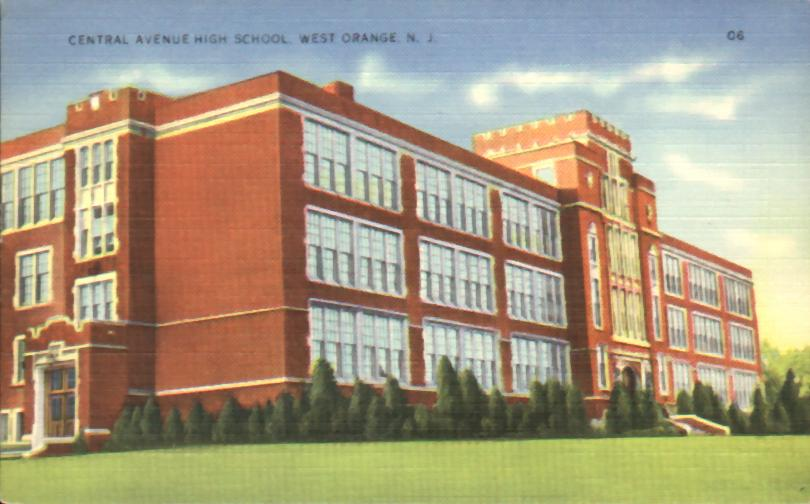
WOHS, 1922–1983

WOHS, 1984–present day
