= One Bright Shining Moment: The Forgotten Summer of George McGovern =

- Directed by: Stephen Vittoria
- Written by: Stephen Vittoria
- Produced by: Stephen Vittoria
- Starring: Warren Beatty; Dick Gregory; Gary Hart; George McGovern; Ron Kovic; Gloria Steinem; Gore Vidal; Howard Zinn
- Narrated by: Amy Goodman
- Music by: Elvis Costello; Donovan; Bob Dylan; Robbie Robertson; Leon Russell
- Distributed by: First Run Features
- Release date: 2005
- Running time: 125 min.
- Country: United States
- Language: English

One Bright Shining Moment: The Forgotten Summer of George McGovern is a 2005 documentary film directed by Stephen Vittoria.

== Overview ==
The film chronicles the unsuccessful 1972 presidential campaign of Democratic South Dakota Senator George McGovern. Narrated by journalist Amy Goodman, the film features appearances from McGovern himself, as well as his 1972 campaign manager and former Colorado Senator Gary Hart, feminist activist Gloria Steinem, historian Howard Zinn, author Gore Vidal, and satirist Dick Gregory.

The film won the Jury Prize Award for Best Documentary Feature at the 2005 Sarasota Film Festival.

== Reception ==
On review aggregator website Rotten Tomatoes, the film holds an approval rating of 82% based on 17 reviews, with an average rating of 6.9/10.
