= Philip D. Kaltenbacher =

American politician (1937–2026)

Philip D. Kaltenbacher (November 7, 1937 – November 6, 2026) was the former chairman and chief executive officer of Seton Company and a former chairman of the Port Authority of New York and New Jersey.

== Biography ==
Kaltenbacher was born on November 7, 1937, in Orange, New Jersey, to Joseph C. Kaltenbacher and Helen (Lowy) Kaltenbacher. Kaltenbacher graduated from Newark Academy in 1955 and received his B.A. from Yale University in 1959, where he was an editor of the Yale Daily News. After serving in the U.S. Army Intelligence Corps, he received his law degree from Yale Law School in 1963 and was admitted to the Bar in Connecticut in 1963 and in New Jersey in 1964. In 1964, Kaltenbacher joined Seton Company, Inc., a leading global supplier of leather for automotive interiors and a manufacturer of chemicals and coated products. He served as Seton's chairman and chief executive officer from 1974 to 2011. In 1987 Kaltenbacher led a group of investors who took Seton private and in 1994 Seton formed an employee stock ownership plan, granting Seton employees a significant ownership interest in the Company.

Kaltenbacher was elected to the New Jersey General Assembly in 1967, and was re-elected in 1969 and 1971. He ran on a ticket with Thomas Kean, who would later serve as Governor of New Jersey. Then a resident of West Orange, New Jersey, Kaltenbacher resumed his career in public service when he became a commissioner of the Port Authority of New York and New Jersey in 1983. He served as a commissioner of the Port Authority until 1993, and served as chairman of the Port Authority from 1985 to 1990 In addition, Kaltenbacher served as the chairman of the board of governors of The Club at the World Trade Center from 1992 to 1993, as the chairman of the Port Authority Trans-Hudson Corporation from 1985 to 1990, and as the chairman of the Newark Legal and Communications Center Urban Renewal Corporation from 1988 to 1990.

Kaltenbacher was honored with numerous awards, including: the New Jersey Humanitarian Award of Catholic Community Services (1987), the Newark Academy Alumni Award for Achievement (1987), the March of Dimes Service to Humanity Award (1988) and the Essex Council Boy Scouts of America Distinguished Citizen Award (1990). In 2012, Newark Academy dedicated Kaltenbacher Hall, a newly constructed lecture room on its campus in Livingston, New Jersey. Kaltenbacher was a Sterling Fellow of Yale University. He was an active supporter of the Animal Rescue Coalition of Sarasota, FL.

Kaltenbacher was married to Unni Hovde for 47 years until her death in August 2023. He has two daughters, Laura Ross and Gail Kurz. Kaltenbacher resided in Jupiter, Florida, and Martha's Vineyard, Massachusetts. He died on November 6, 2026, at the age of 88.

New Jersey General Assembly
Preceded by District created	Member of the New Jersey General Assembly from the 11-F district 1968–1972; Served alongside: Thomas Kean	Succeeded by District abolished
Preceded by Kenneth T. Wilson; John N. Dennis	Member of the New Jersey General Assembly from the 11-E district 1972–1974; Served alongside: Thomas Kean	Succeeded by District abolished
Party political offices
Preceded by David A. Norcross	Chairman of the New Jersey Republican State Committee; 1981–1985	Succeeded by Frank B. Holman
Political offices
Preceded by Alan Sagner	Chairman of the Port Authority of New York and New Jersey; 1985–1990	Succeeded by Richard Leone
