= Death of Elizabeth Shin =

American student at Massachusetts Institute of Technology

Elizabeth H. Shin (September 26, 1980 – April 14, 2000) was a Massachusetts Institute of Technology (MIT) student who died from burns inflicted by a fire in her dormitory room. Her death led to a lawsuit against MIT and controversy as to whether MIT paid adequate attention to its students' mental and emotional health, and whether its suicide rate was abnormally high. Although her death was first thought to be a suicide, both MIT and her parents stipulated that it may have been an accident in the subsequent amicable settlement between MIT and the Shin family.

== Background ==
Elizabeth Shin
- Shin in the 1990s
- Born: September 26, 1980; Livingston, New Jersey, U.S.
- Died: April 14, 2000 (aged 19)
- Education: Massachusetts Institute of Technology

Korean name
- Hangul: 신진희
- Hanja: 申珍嬉
- RR: Sin Jinhui
- MR: Sin Chinhŭi

Shin was born on September 26, 1980. She was the eldest daughter to Korean parents Kisuk (née Pak) and Cho Hyun Shin, and was raised in Livingston, New Jersey. She was the salutatorian of her graduating class at West Orange High School. Shin began attending MIT as a biology major in September 1998 and resided at the on-campus Random Hall dormitory.

MIT had experienced nine suicides since 1990, provoking controversy as to whether MIT's suicide rate was abnormally high.

Shin had regularly used the services of MIT's Counseling and Support Services (CSS) since March 1999, after breaking up with a boyfriend. CSS later said that Shin admitted to habitual cutting since high school and noted that her symptoms were consistent with "passive suicidal ideation". On March 29, 2000, a new psychiatrist diagnosed her with borderline personality disorder and major depressive disorder; Shin would enter another "severe" depressive episode the next day, for which the psychiatrist increased her Celexa prescription. Shin asked to be excused for an exam on April 3 and on the evening of April 8, a student reported MIT police after Shin had talked about killing herself with a knife, though she was returned to her dorm within the hour as staff found that Shin was "not acutely suicidal".

== Incident ==
On April 10, 2000, at approximately 12:30 am, Random Hall dorm mistress Nina Davis-Millis was informed by two students that Shin had informed them of a planned suicide and asked them to delete files from her computer. Davis-Millis alerted MIT Mental Health services, who told her to check on Shin, but that there was no need for immediate intervention and that trained staff would come a few hours later at 6:30 am. Davis-Millis ultimately decided against entering Shin's room to avoid waking her up in case she was asleep and instead wrote her an e-mail. Shin's reply led to a "disturbing conversation", during which Shin wrote something to the effect of "You won't have to worry about me any more". A deans and psychs meeting was organized at 11:00 am to discuss more extensive medical treatment for Shin due to her comments and a message was left on Shin's answering machine inviting her to a counseling session, but no direct actions were otherwise undertaken.

Shortly before 9:00 pm, a student named Andrew Thomas heard a smoke alarm in Elizabeth's dorm room. Although the door was locked, Thomas could smell smoke and could hear crying coming from within the room. When MIT police broke down the door, they saw Shin "engulfed in flames, flailing on the floor in the middle of her room." Sixty-five percent of her body was covered in third-degree burns, and she died four days later.

== Lawsuit ==
On January 28, 2002, Shin's family filed a $27.65 million wrongful-death lawsuit against the school and several administrators and employees. They accused the school of "breaching its 'promise' to provide an appropriate medical diagnosis and treatment of Shin, as well as reasonable security, emergency services, and level of care". The lawsuit alleged that despite numerous warning signs, such as sending emails to faculty members saying that she was depressed, engaging in self-harm and wanted to kill herself, she received minimal attention. Furthermore, Shin had been diagnosed with adjustment disorder by a mental health counsellor in February 1999, after Shin underwent psychological screening at McLean Hospital following brief hospitalization at Massachusetts General Hospital for overdosing on Tylenol. Between 1999 and 2000, MIT counseling services sometimes relegated duty to her parents, discharged her with minimal treatment, or failed to take action in response to her emails. Shin's parents say that their daughter's death was the 10th of 12 suicides committed by MIT students since 1990 and was foreseeable by the school's administrators and its Mental Health Services employees.

As part of its defense, MIT implied that Shin's mental health problems started before she entered MIT, including a possible suicide attempt when Shin missed becoming valedictorian of her graduating class.

After the incident, MIT announced an upgrade of its student counseling programs, including more staff members and longer hours. MIT and campus police officers were cleared of wrongdoing in June 2005, but the case against MIT administrators and mental health employees continued. The Shins' lawyer David Deluca commented that the counts against MIT might have been limited by the "immunity that the institution enjoys" as an educational institution.

MIT continued to deny wrongdoing.

On April 3, 2006, MIT announced that the lawsuit had been settled for an undisclosed amount. The Shins released a statement, saying, "We appreciate MIT's willingness to spare our family the ordeal of a trial and have come to understand that our daughter's death was likely a tragic accident. This agreement will allow us to move forward in the healing process."

The Shins' lawyer stated that the results of a toxicology test indicated that Elizabeth had overdosed on a nonprescription medication before the fire that could have prevented her from responding appropriately to the blaze. This evidence may have played a part in the Shins' later admission that Elizabeth's death was an accident.

According to an unreferenced 2011 article in The Boston Globe, MIT's suicide rate was not higher than other colleges, refuting an earlier The Boston Globe article cited in The New York Times. The picture is muddied by conflicting studies, unequal comparisons, the sparse nature of the event of suicide compared to other activities, conflicts of interest of reporting parties, and changes in the attitude and actions of academic administrations over the decades.

== MIT statement ==
MIT Chancellor Phillip Clay announced the trial settlement with this message to the community on April 3, 2006:

To Members of the MIT Community:

As most of you know, the family of Elizabeth Shin had brought a lawsuit against MIT and some members of the student life staff and medical staff following the death of their daughter in April 2000. The suit against the university itself was dismissed in June 2005 and a trial date for the remaining claims was set for May 1, 2006.

With the trial date approaching, Elizabeth's parents, Cho and Kisuk Shin, have agreed in a settlement with MIT to dismiss all of their claims, saying that they have come to understand that their daughter's death was likely a tragic accident.

We know nothing can erase the pain of losing their daughter. Elizabeth's death was a tragedy for her family, her friends and all those at MIT who tried to help her. Indeed, the death of a student is one of the most painful losses a college community can suffer.

We are very grateful to our colleagues in Student Life and MIT Medical who devote themselves to the well-being of our students with an extraordinary level of caring and professionalism. This agreement will spare all of them the further distress of an emotional trial.

Sincerely,

Phillip L. Clay

— Phillip Clay
