= Richard Leone =

American politician (1940–2015)

Richard C. Leone

Treasurer of New Jersey
- In office 1974–1977
- Governor: Brendan Byrne
- Preceded by: William Marfuggi
- Succeeded by: Clifford Goldman

Chairman of the Port Authority of New York and New Jersey
- In office 1990–1994
- Preceded by: Philip D. Kaltenbacher
- Succeeded by: Kathleen Donovan

Personal details
- Born: April 30, 1940 Webster, New York, U.S.
- Died: July 16, 2015 (aged 75) Hopewell, New Jersey, U.S.
- Spouse(s): Anita Osper (div.); Meg Cox
- Relations: Santo Leone (father); Lucy Penello Leone (mother); Sandra Brooks (sister)
- Children: Kate Leone (daughter); Max Leone (son)
- Education: University of Rochester; Woodrow Wilson School of Public and International Affairs of Princeton University

Richard Carl Leone (April 30, 1940 – July 16, 2015) was an American Democratic Party politician who served as New Jersey State Treasurer from 1974 to 1977 and as Chairman of the Port Authority of New York and New Jersey from 1990 to 1994. Leone also worked for Lyndon B. Johnson, Robert F. Kennedy and Edmund Muskie.

== Early life ==
Leone was born in Webster, New York on April 30, 1940, the son of Santo Leone, who was the operations director for Page Airways and Lucy Penello Leone. He was a 1965 graduate of the University of Rochester and later earned masters and doctoral degrees from the Woodrow Wilson School of Public and International Affairs at Princeton University.

== Political career ==
=== Staffer and operative ===
From 1965 to 1967, Leone served on the staff of Governor Richard J. Hughes. He served in the administration of President Lyndon Johnson as Executive Director of the White House Task Force on the Cities. Leone was the New Jersey Coordinator for the campaign of Robert F. Kennedy for the Democratic nomination for President in 1968. He was the Director of the Center for the Analysis of Public Issues, a consumer research think tank, from 1970 to 1972. In 1972, he was part of the policy team for the campaign of Edmund Muskie for the Democratic presidential nomination.

In 1973, Leone became the campaign manager for Brendan Byrne, who won the Democratic nomination for Governor of New Jersey and defeated Republican Congressman Charles W. Sandman Jr. by 721,000 votes (66.4%).

Leone returned to the Byrne campaign in the spring of 1977 when the Governor faced competitive primary and general election campaigns.

In 1984, Leone was a senior advisor to the presidential campaign of Walter Mondale. After Jon Corzine was elected Governor in 2005, Leone became Chairman of the Governor-elect's transition team.

=== New Jersey State Treasurer ===
On December 14, 1973, Byrne appointed Leone to his cabinet to serve as State Treasurer. At age 33, he became one of the youngest persons to ever serve as New Jersey State Treasurer. He took office on January 14, 1974, following his confirmation by the New Jersey State Senate. He held the post until resigning in 1977 to become a lecturer at Princeton University.

=== Campaign for U.S. Senator ===
In 1978, Republican Clifford Case, 74, was seeking re-election to a fifth term in the United States Senate. On January 28, 1978, Leone announced that he would seek the Democratic U.S. Senate nomination. With the "tacit" support of the Democratic Governor, Leone began to win endorsements from key Democratic county organizations. One potential rival, two-term Congressman Andrew Maguire withdrew from the race and endorsed Leone. So did Jersey City Mayor Thomas F.X. Smith, Hudson County Democratic Chairman Frank Guarini and Camden Mayor Angelo Errichetti. He also had the backing of Mercer County Democratic Chairman Richard J. Coffee. Former New York Knicks star Bill Bradley entered the race on February 16 On February 22, former State Senator Alexander J. Menza joined the race. Menza later alleged that allies of Leone tried to get him out of the race with the offer of a state appointment; Leone denied that.

A poll conducted by the Associated Press and WNBC-TV in mid-May showed Bradley ahead by a 37%-9% margin, with 3% for Menza. Leone charged Bradley with running an "arrogant" and "phony" campaign, and called Bradley, who moved to New Jersey while playing basketball, a carpetbagger.

Bradley won the Democratic primary by a wide margin, 58.9% to 26.5% for Leone, a plurality of 119,835 votes. Menza finished third with 9%, followed by 3% for Kenneth G. McCarthy, 2% for Stafford Township Mayor Wesley Bell, and 1% for Ray Rollinson. Case lost the Republican primary to conservative Jeffrey Bell, and Bradley won the Senate seat in the general election.

=== Port Authority Commissioner and Chairman ===
Governor Thomas Kean, a Republican, appointed Leone to serve as a Commissioner of the Port Authority of New York and New Jersey. In 1990, Leone was named Chairman of the Port Authority by the newly elected Governor, Democrat James Florio. He replaced Philip Kaltenbacher, who had held the post under Kean. Gov. Byrne has twice sought to get Leone appointed as Executive Director of the Port Authority, but he was blocked by New York Governor Hugh Carey.

=== Private sector ===
Leone was president of the New York Mercantile Exchange from 1980 to 1982 and managing director of Dillon, Read & Co., a New York City investment bank, from 1985 to 1989. From 1989 to 2011, he served as President of the Twentieth Century Fund (now called The Century Foundation), a progressive think tank that focused on issues of inequality, voting rights, civil liberties and opposition to the privatization of Social Security. He retired in 2011.

== Death ==
Leone died of prostate cancer in 2015.

Political offices
Preceded by William Marfuggi	Treasurer of New Jersey; 1974–1977	Succeeded by Clifford Goldman
