= Seton Company, Inc. =

- Formerly: Seton Leather Company of Pennsylvania
- Type: Subsidiary
- Industry: Automotive interior products, leather manufacturing
- Founded: 1906
- Founder: Joseph Kaltenbacher
- Defunct: 2011
- Fate: Acquired by and merged into GST AutoLeather, Inc.
- Products: Leather products for automotive interiors
- Parent: GST AutoLeather (2011–2021); Pangea (2021–present)

Seton Company, Inc. or the Seton Leather Company of Pennsylvania (SEPA) is a former manufacturer and supplier of leather products—and later brand—for automotive interiors. The company was founded in 1906 by German tanner Joespeh Kaltenbacher and was one of the largest leather suppliers for automotive upholstery. It was based in West Bloomfield, Michigan and previously headquartered in Norristown, Pennsylvania. On January 3, 2011, the company became a subsidiary of GST AutoLeather, Inc., making the world's largest seat supplier for the automotive industry and rebranding as GST Seton AutoLeather. In 2021, GST was renamed Pangea.
