= West Orange Public Schools =

School district in Essex County, New Jersey, US

Address
- 179 Eagle Rock Avenue West Orange, Essex County, New Jersey, 07052; United States
- Coordinates: 40.794148°N 74.234557°W

District information
- Grades: PreK to 12
- Superintendent: Hayden Moore
- Business administrator: Tonya Flowers
- Schools: 12

Students and staff
- Enrollment: 6,718 (as of 2019–20)
- Faculty: 632.5 FTEs
- Student–teacher ratio: 10.6:1

Other information
- District Factor Group: GH
- Website: www.woboe.org
Ind.	Per pupil	District spending	Rank (*)	K-12 average	%± vs. average
1A	Total Spending	$22,317	89	$18,891	18.1%
1	Budgetary Cost	16,188	82	14,783	9.5%
2	Classroom Instruction	10,664	96	8,763	21.7%
6	Support Services	2,011	34	2,392	−15.9%
8	Administrative Cost	1,583	72	1,485	6.6%
10	Operations & Maintenance	1,605	49	1,783	−10.0%
13	Extracurricular Activities	260	56	268	−3.0%
16	Median Teacher Salary	82,623	100	64,043
Data from NJDoE 2014 Taxpayers' Guide to Education Spending. *Of K-12 districts with more than 3,500 students. Lowest spending=1; Highest=103

The West Orange Public Schools is a comprehensive community public school district serving students in pre-kindergarten through twelfth grade in West Orange in Essex County, in the U.S. state of New Jersey.

As of the 2019–20 school year, the district, comprised of 12 schools, had an enrollment of 6,718 students and 632.5 classroom teachers (on an FTE basis), for a student–teacher ratio of 10.6:1.

The district is classified by the New Jersey Department of Education as being in District Factor Group "GH", the third-highest of eight groupings. District Factor Groups organize districts statewide to allow comparison by common socioeconomic characteristics of the local districts. From lowest socioeconomic status to highest, the categories are A, B, CD, DE, FG, GH, I and J.

Since opening its first school in 1895, the district has expanded to include seven elementary schools, three middle schools and one high school. In the 1990s, the district was ranked among the top 1% of schools in the nation by The Washington Post.

== Awards, recognition and rankings ==
The district was selected as one of the 2023 Best Communities for Music Education in the nation by the National Association of Music Merchants.

During the 2008-09 school year, Hazel Avenue School was recognized with the National Blue Ribbon Schools Program Award of Excellence by the United States Department of Education, the highest award an American school can receive. In 2022, Redwood Elementary was named as a National Blue Ribbon School, along with eight other schools in the state and 297 schools nationwide.

== Schools ==
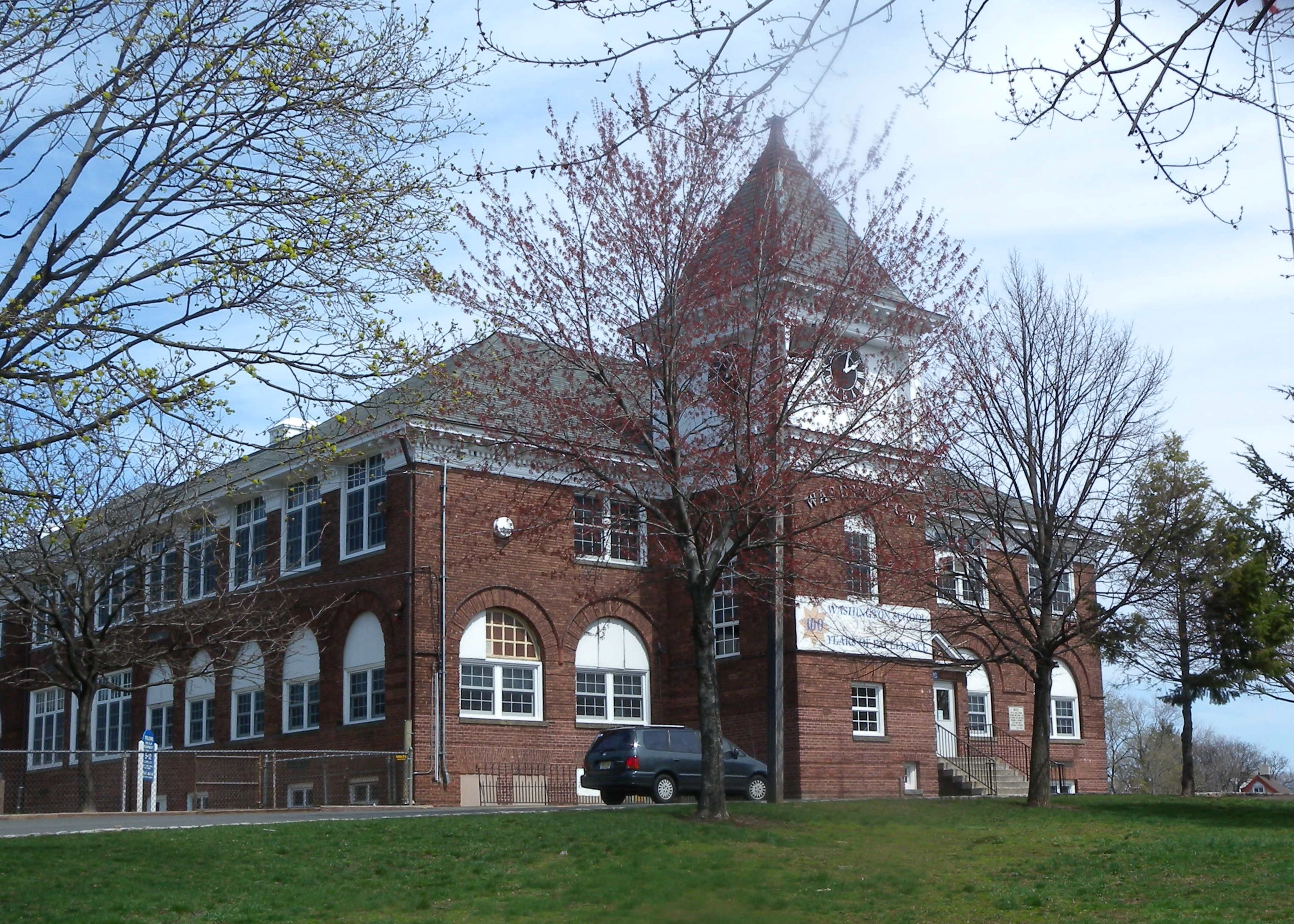
Washington Elementary School

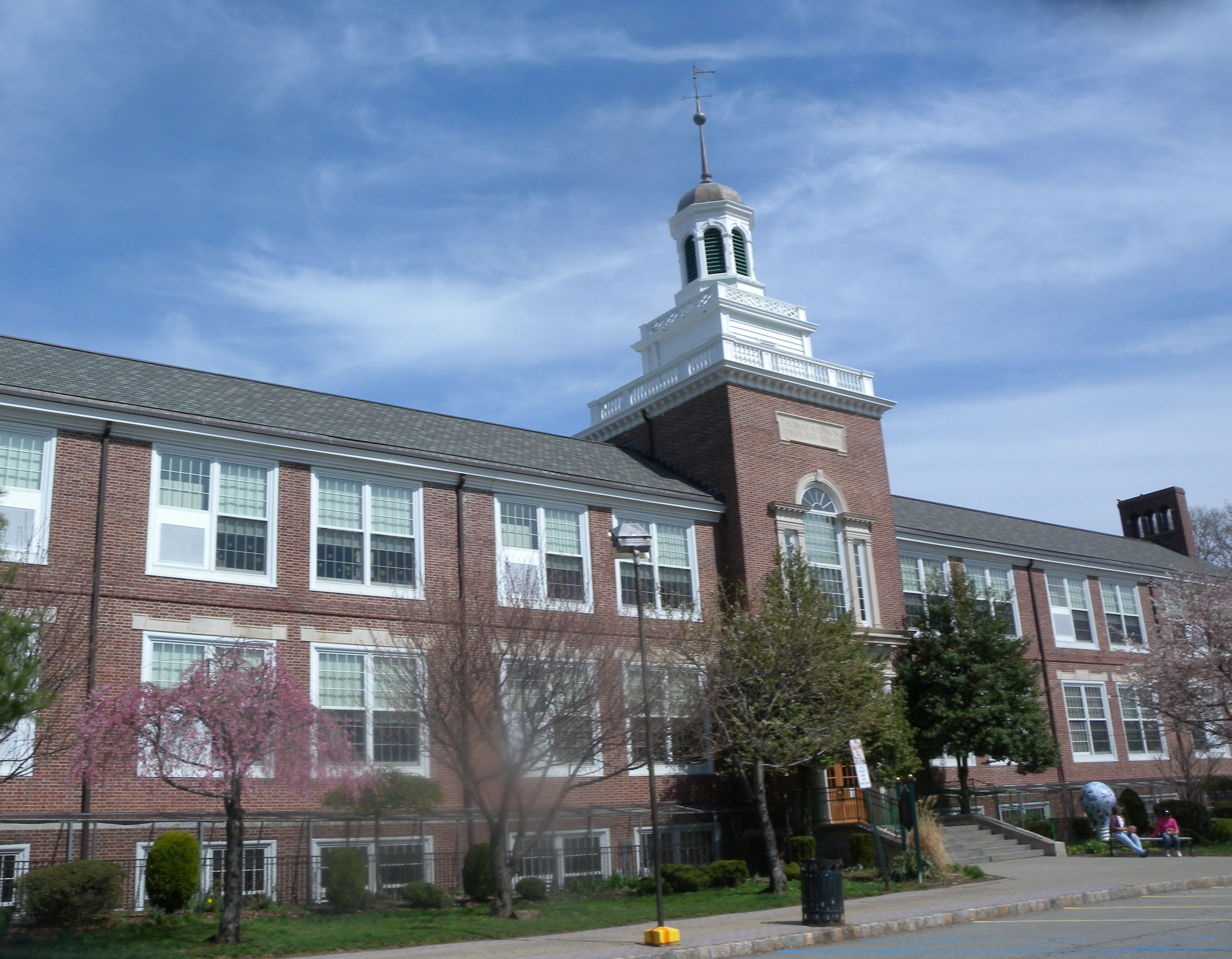
Edison Middle School

Schools in the district (with 2019–20 enrollment data from the National Center for Education Statistics) are:

Early education

- Betty Maddalena Early Learning Center (with 71 students in PreK)
- West Orange Early Childhood Learning Center (with unknown number of students in Prek)

Elementary schools

- Gregory Elementary School (454 students; in grades K-5)
  - Makeida Hewitt, principal
- Hazel Avenue Elementary School (320; K-5)
  - Joel Castillo, principal
- Kelly Elementary School (455; PreK-5). The school was renamed in May 2016 in honor of Mark and Scott Kelly, identical twins who attended what was then Pleasantdale School starting in second grade before becoming NASA astronauts.
  - David Marion, principal
- Mount Pleasant Elementary School (353; K-5)
  - Marc Lawrence, principal
- Redwood Elementary School (509; K-5)
  - Kimya Jackson, principal
- St. Cloud Elementary School (356; K-5)
  - Eric Price, principal
- Washington Elementary School (417; K-5)
  - Marie DeMaio, principal

Middle schools

- Thomas A. Edison Middle School (516; 6-8)
  - Steven Melendez, principal
- Liberty Middle School (536; 6-8)
  - Xavier M. Fitzgerald, principal
- Roosevelt Middle School (487; 6-8)
  - Lionel O. Hush, principal

High School

- West Orange High School (2,098; 9-12)
  - Oscar Guerrero, principal

== Defunct school facilities ==
- Three schools have occupied the same location on Gaston Street. The first was the original West Orange High School, built in 1898. It burned down in 1913, was rebuilt, and linked by a shared auditorium to Fairmount Avenue Elementary School. In 1912, the elementary school had been built behind the high school with its entrance on Fairmount Avenue. (At that time, Fairmount Avenue ran parallel to Gaston Street but it no longer exists.) In 1922, when a new high school was constructed on Northfield Avenue (now Seton Hall Prep), the old high school was transformed into Gaston Street Junior High School. Fairmount Avenue Elementary School remained the same. In the 1950s, Gaston Street Junior High School closed, and the building was transformed once again and became part of Fairmount Elementary School, and then later into the Board of Education offices. In 1972, Fairmount Elementary School dropped the "Avenue" from its name and it was moved to a new building on the corner of Northfield and Gregory Avenues (now the Golda Och Academy Lower School Campus). The board of education offices remained on Gaston Street and took over both old school buildings. In the late 1970s, both buildings were demolished and the board of education offices were relocated to Eagle Rock Avenue School. The Gaston Street/Fairmount Avenue land parcel became the site of the Fairmount House (now the John P. Renna Jr.) Senior Citizens Housing Complex. A small portion of the land became an extension of the parking lot for the adjacent Town Hall.
- Eagle Rock Avenue Elementary School – Converted into new Board of Education offices.
- Fairmount Elementary School – Sold and became Solomon Schechter Day School Lower Campus (Jewish).
- West Orange High School (Northfield Avenue) – Sold and became Seton Hall Preparatory School (Catholic).
- West Orange Mountain High School – Built in 1960 as a second high school, located behind Abraham Lincoln Junior High School with its entrance on Conforti Avenue. It became the "new" West Orange High School when the two high schools merged in 1984.
- Abraham Lincoln Junior High School – On Pleasant Valley Way, it was adjacent and connected to West Orange Mountain High School through a pair of corridor/bridges. The two schools shared an auditorium. Later, when West Orange Mountain High School became the "new" West Orange High, Lincoln was closed and the building absorbed by the "new" high school in order to enlarge it.

== Administration ==
Core members of the district's administration are:

- Hayden Moore, superintendent of schools
- Tonya Flowers, business administrator and board secretary

== Board of education ==
The district's board of education, comprised of five members, sets policy and oversees the fiscal and educational operation of the district through its administration. As a Type II school district, the board's trustees are elected directly by voters to serve three-year terms of office on a staggered basis, with either one or two seats up for election each year held (since 2012) as part of the November general election. The board appoints a superintendent to oversee the district's day-to-day operations and a business administrator to supervise the business functions of the district.
