= Jemima Condict =

American diarist (1754–1779)

- Born: August 24, 1754; Pleasantdale, Essex County, New Jersey
- Died: November 14, 1779 (aged 25); Pleasantdale, Essex County, New Jersey
- Resting place: First Presbyterian Church of Orange, New Jersey
- Known for: Kept a diary leading up to the Revolutionary War

Jemima Condict (August 24, 1754 – November 14, 1779) was an American diarist from colonial New Jersey .

== Biography ==
Jemima Condict was born in the mountains of northwestern New Jersey on August 24, 1754. Her parents were Ruth Harrison (of Samuel) and Daniel Condit of Samuel Condit and Mary Dodd, Jemima's grandparents referenced in Jemima's colonial, Revolutionary War-era diary housed by the New Jersey Historical Society. She married the Revolutionary War Captain Aaron Harrison (of Samuel).

Jemima spent her entire life in the vicinity of Pleasantdale, which is now in West Orange, New Jersey, dying on 14 November 1779 at the age of twenty-five. She was educated enough to be able to write. At the age of seventeen, in early 1772, she began a diary and made sporadic entries in it for the rest of her life. In "Guide to the Jemima Condict Diary 1772-1779 MG 123" published online by The New Jersey Historical Society" it explains "Although her name by birth was Condit, she added a "c" to her name against her parents behest."

Condict titled her diary "J2M3M1 C59D3CT H2R B44K 19D P29", using a code that also appeared in a number of the diary's lines of verse. She used the numbers 1–9 to replace the letters a, e, i, o, u, y, t, s, and n, in that order. The decoded title reads; "JEMIMA CUNDICT HER BOOK AND PEN".

Jemima died in childbirth on Nov 14, 1779.

== Diary ==
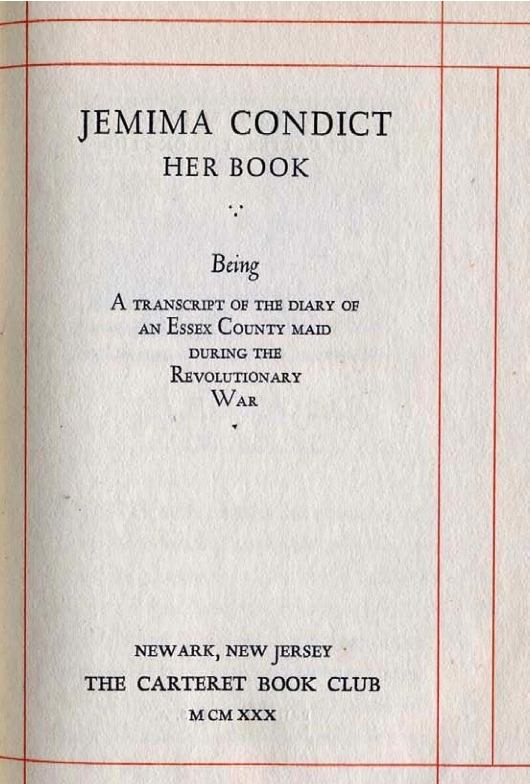
Inside cover page of Frederic and Bertha Goudy's 1930 version of Jemima Condict's diary.

The only published full text of the diary is titled "Her Book, Being a transcript of the diary of an Essex County maid during the Revolutionary War". It was published in a collectors' edition of only 200 copies by the typographer Frederic Goudy and his wife Bertha Goudy. Two other books, one by Elizabeth Evans and the other by June Sprigg, contain many of Jemima Condict's entries.

Jemima Condict was religious and most of her diary consists of listings of religious teachings she heard, with occasional commentary. Her writing provides evidence of the lives of her family and community, as well as events of the Revolutionary War.

She also wrote about pressure to marry as a young women:

"Thursday I had some Discourse v/ith Mr. Chandler, he asked me why I Did not marry, I told him I want in no hurry. Well Said he I wish I was maried to you. I told him he would Soon wish himself on maried agin...Because you will find that I am a cross ill contrived Pese of Stuf I told him that I would advise all the men to remain as they was for the women was Bad & the men so much worse that It was a wonder if they agreed. So I scard the poor fellow & he is gone."

News of the Boston Tea Party had reached rural New Jersey as Jemima Condict wrote ten months after that event.

"Saturday October first 1774. It seams we
have troublesome times a Coming for there
is great Disturbance a Broad in the earth &
they say it is tea that caused it. So then if they
will Quarel about such a trifling thing as that
What must we expect But war & I think or
at least fear it will be so."

Condict briefly mentions the inoculation of her cousins, probably against smallpox, using a weak strain of the disease long before Edward Jenner developed cowpox-based vaccination is of scientific interest.

"Monday February 5, 1775, Was my Cou-
sins Knockulated I am apt to think they will
repent there Undertaking before they Done
with it for I am Shure tis a great venter. But
Sence they are gone I wish them Success And
I think they have Had good luck So far for
they have all Got home Alive But I fear Cou-
sin N Dod Wont get over it well."

An entry from March 1775 describes a local party for some newly-weds. She makes reference to "horse neck kites", natives of Horseneck Tract.

"Tuesday went up to my Sister ogdens and
there was a house full of people & we had a
great Sing indeed for the horse neck kites &
the newarkites were Both assembled Togeth-
er & there was the new maried Couple L W.
Juner & you may be Shure they cut a fine
figer for She is a Bounser Joan And he a little
Cross Snipper Snapper snipe. they tell me he
Cryd When he was maried at which I Don't
a bit Wonder for I think twas anuf to make
the poor fellow bellow if he had his wits
about him, for I am shure She Can Beat him..."

In her entry for April 23, 1775, she relates events that occurred in the aftermath of the Battles of Lexington and Concord. The "Regulors" or "regulers" are “regular” British soldiers.

"April 23. 1775. as every Day Brings New
Troubels So this Day Brings News that yes-
terday very early in the morning They Began
to fight at Boston, the regulers. We hear
Shot first there; they killed 30 of our men A
hundred & 50 of the Regulors."

A local violent death caught her attention in 1775.

"September the 28 1775. Was thomas
Crane very Sudenly & in An aufull manner
taken out of time into eternity; He was Plow-
ing in the field his father Was cutting of a
tree that was turned up by the roots & that
instand he had Cut it off, his Son Past By &
the root flew Back & Took him under Which
killed him immediately..."

Condit wrote about the local Revolutionary War fighting during the Battle of Elizabethtown" in what is now Elizabeth, New Jersey.

"September ye 12 1777 On Friday there
was an Alarm our Milita was Calld; The Reg-
elars come over into elesebeth town Where
they had a Brush With a Small Party of our
People; then marched Quietly up to Newark;
& took all the Cattle they Could, there was
five of the Milita at Newark. they killed Sam-
uel Crane & took Zadock; and Allen heady;
& Samuel freman Prisoners. one out of five
run & escapt..."

Any notice of July 4, 1776, is notably absent.

The manuscript diary is held in the collections of the New Jersey Historical Society's Manuscript Group 123.
