= McClure twins =

YouTube personality duo (born 2013)

Ava and Alexis McClure
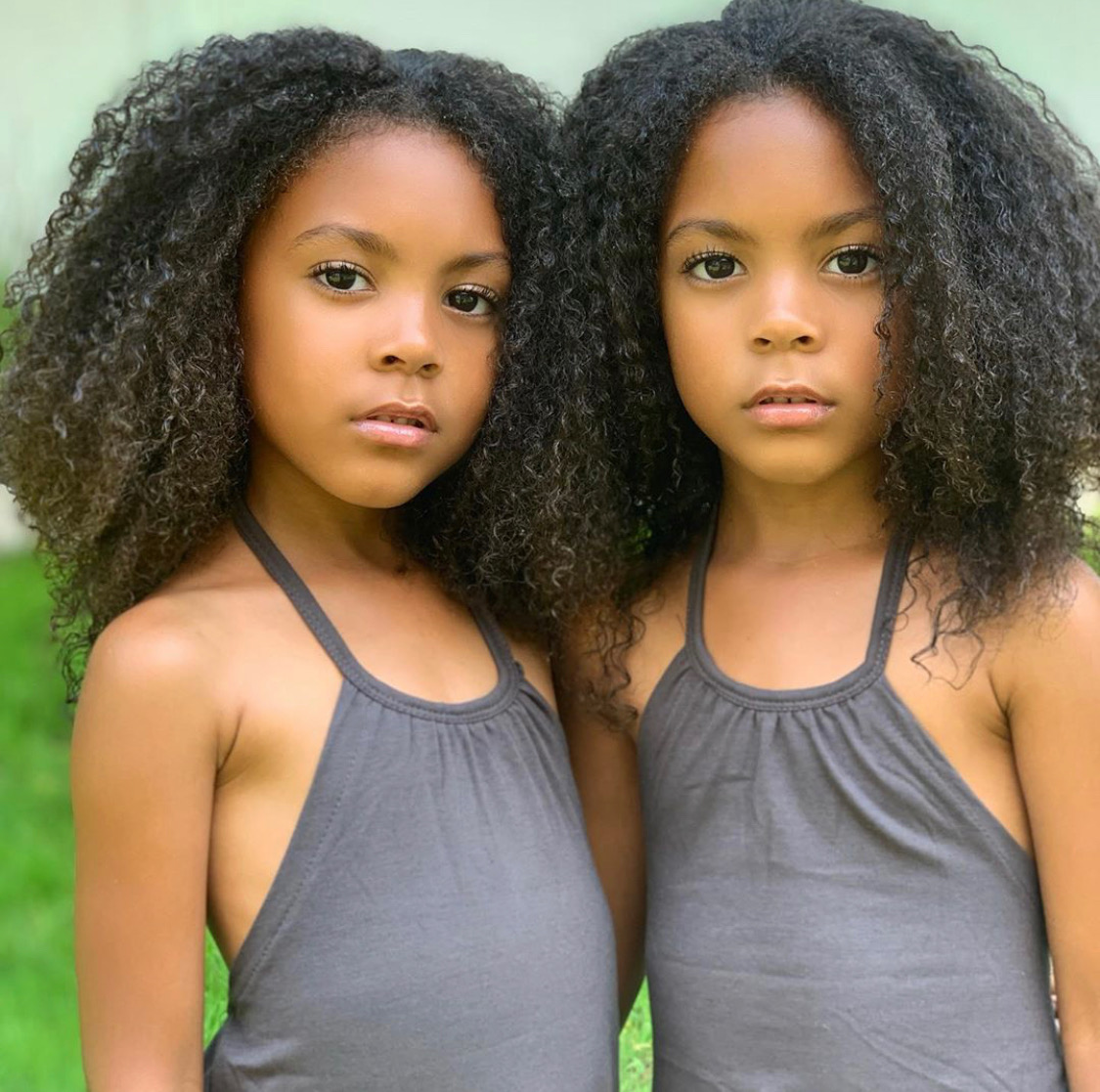
- Ava (left) and Alexis (right) in 2019.
- Born: Ava Zaina McClure; Alexis Valora McClure; July 12, 2013 (age 13); Paterson, New Jersey, U.S.

YouTube information
- Channel: the Mighty McClures
- Years active: 2015–present
- Genre: Family
- Subscribers: 4.4 million
- Views: 1.7 billion
- Last updated: 19 August 2026

Ava Zaina and Alexis Valora McClure (born July 12, 2013), known as the McClure twins, are YouTube personalities. The identical twin sisters are best known for their 2016 viral video Twins Realize They Look the Same. In 2017, the McClure Twins were named the youngest members of Forbes' “Top Kid Influencers.” The twins, along with Zion, a That Girl Lay Lay stage dancer, have made a song called “We're Young with Something to Say” which they performed in 2025. Alexis and Ava have a lot of videos, and boast over 1 million subscribers on their channel, “The McClure Twins.”

== Life and career ==
Ava and Alexis were born in Paterson, New Jersey to Aminat “Ami” Dunni Ahmed and Jeff Pestka. Ami later divorced Jeff and married Justin McClure in July 2015. McClure adopted the twins shortly thereafter in 2016. In November 2017, the couple had a son, Jersey Tayo McClure. Following the twins' viral YouTube video, Twins Realize They Look the Same, Justin and Ami developed the family's YouTube channel, "The Mighty McClures." The family lives in Atlanta, Georgia.

The McClure Twins made their television debut on Good Morning America in 2016. They have also appeared on NBC's California Live show. In 2017, they walked in the Rookie USA fashion show during New York Fashion Week and have since modeled for brands such as Levi Strauss, Converse, Hurley, Air Jordan, American Girl and Nike. In 2021, the twins released their first book called "The McClure Twins: Make It Fashion."
