= Herbert Rinaldi =

American politician (1928–2010)

Herbert M. Rinaldi

Member of the New Jersey General Assembly from the Essex County District 11E
- In office January 9, 1968 – January 11, 1972 Serving with John N. Dennis, David Goldfarb
- Preceded by: District created
- Succeeded by: Eldridge Hawkins; Peter Stewart
- Constituency: District 11E (1968–1970); District 11D (1970–1972)

Personal details
- Born: August 16, 1928 Weehawken, New Jersey
- Died: September 25, 2010 (aged 82) Glen Ridge, New Jersey
- Party: Republican

Herbert Milton Rinaldi (August 16, 1928 – September 25, 2010) was an American Republican Party politician who served in the New Jersey General Assembly.

Rinaldi was a 1949 graduate of Princeton University and received his law degree from Columbia Law School in 1952. He served in the U.S. Navy from 1952 to 1955, where he became a lieutenant. He was in air intelligence with Fighter Squadron 61 (VF-61). He was the Chairman of the Glen Ridge Young Republican Club and was the Counsel to the Essex County Young Republicans.

== Political career ==
He was elected to the New Jersey State Assembly in 1967, running in Essex County District 11E. Running with John N. Dennis, they defeated Beatrice Carlson and Joseph Napolitano in the Republican primary. In the general election, Rinaldi and Dennis defeated Democrats Ralph G. Conte and John T. Regan.

After redistricting, he ran for re-election to a second term in 1969 with David Goldfarb; this time Rinaldi was elected from District 11D. They defeated Democrats Joseph C. Barry, Jr. and Edward J. Lynch. He did not seek re-election to a third term in 1971.

During his four years in the Legislature, Rinaldi served as Chairman of the Assembly Committee on Conservation and Natural Resources, the Assembly Judiciary Committee and the Assembly Committee on Law Enforcement and Public Safety. The Eagleton Institute of Politics at Rutgers University named him at the Outstanding Legislator of the Year in 1969.

After serving in the Legislature, Rinaldi was the President of the Life Sciences Division at Becton, Dickinson and Company, and then as a partner at the law firm of former Governor Brendan Byrne. He died in Glen Ridge, New Jersey on September 25, 2010.
