= David Goldfarb =

American politician 1917–2000)

David Goldfarb (March 1, 1917 - January 27, 2000) was an American Republican Party politician who served in the New Jersey General Assembly. He was the longtime Republican Party Chairman in South Orange, New Jersey. He was elected to the State Assembly in 1969, running with incumbent Herbert Rinaldi in Essex County District 11D. They defeated Democrats Joseph C. Barry, Jr. and Edward J. Lynch. He did not seek re-election in 1971 after legislative redistricting placed him in the same district as Republican incumbents Thomas Kean and Philip Kaltenbacher. He worked as a lobbyist for the taxi and confectionery industries for many years after leaving the Legislature.
