= Hugh Henry Breckenridge =

American painter (1870–1937)

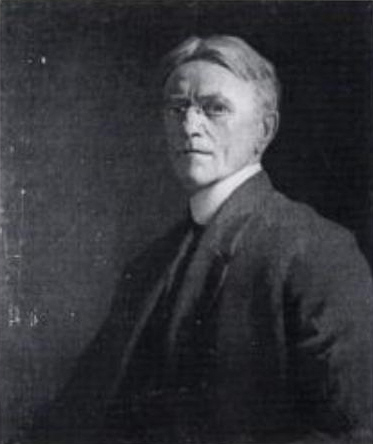
- Self-portrait 1913
- Born: October 6, 1870; Leesburg, Virginia
- Died: November 4, 1937 (aged 67); Philadelphia, Pennsylvania
- Known for: Painting, Educator

Hugh Henry Breckenridge (1870 – 1937), was an American painter and art instructor, who championed the artistic movements from impressionism to modernism. Breckenridge taught for more than forty years at the Pennsylvania Academy of Fine Arts, becoming the school's Dean of Instruction in 1934. He also taught from 1899 to 1918 at the Darby School of Art, which he co-founded with Thomas Anshutz (1851-1912), and from 1920 to 1937 at his own Breckenridge School of Art in Gloucester, Massachusetts.

== Biography ==
Breckenridge was born on October 6, 1870, in Leesburg, Virginia. He attended the Pennsylvania Academy of the Fine Arts where he met first met William Edmondson. In 1892, he traveled to Paris where he studied under Adolphe William Bouguereau. He travelled through Europe with his colleague Walter E. Schofield.

In 1894 when he returned to Philadelphia he began his career at the Pennsylvania Academy of the Fine Arts (PAFA), where he would teach for more than forty years.

Breckenridge opened his own school in Gloucester, Massachusetts, the Breckenridge School of Art, where he taught summer classes every year from 1920 to 1937.

Breckenridge exhibited widely from 1896 until his death, starting at the Art Club of Philadelphia and, towards the end of his life, in 1934, at the Whitney Museum. His work was included in the 1926 Philadelphia Sesqui-Centennial Exhibition.

Breckenridge was a member of the Philadelphia Art Alliance, Philadelphia Sketch Club, and the Arts Club of Philadelphia.

He died on November 4, 1937, in Philadelphia, while he was still on the faculty of the PAFA.

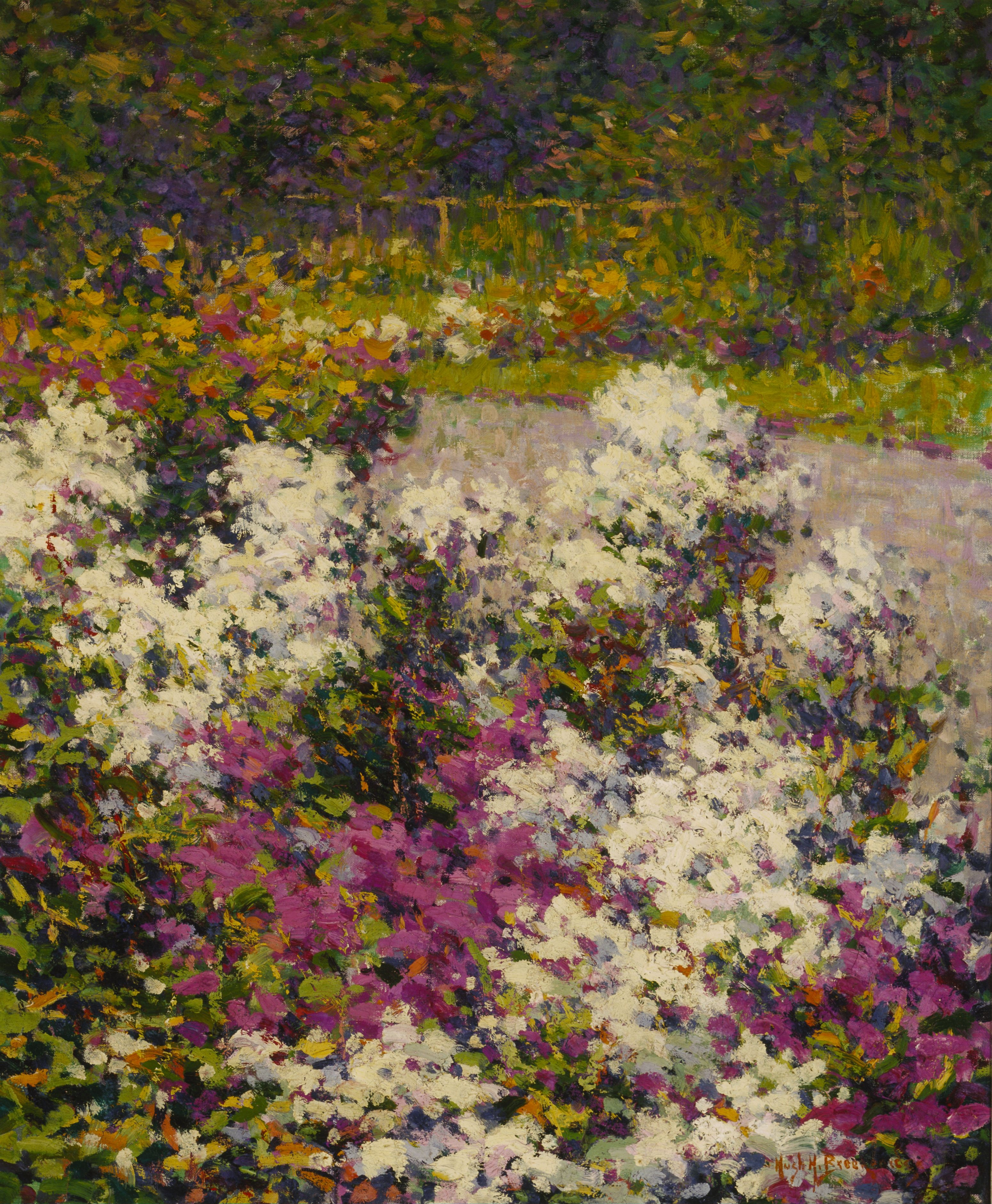
White Phlox, 1906.
Terra Foundation for American Art, Chicago, Illinois

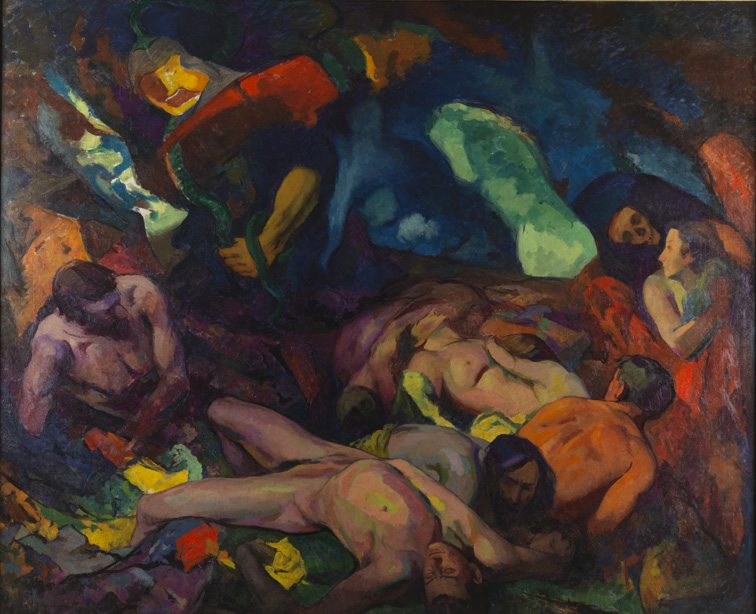
The Pestilence (formerly War), c.1918.
Pennsylvania Academy of the Fine Arts

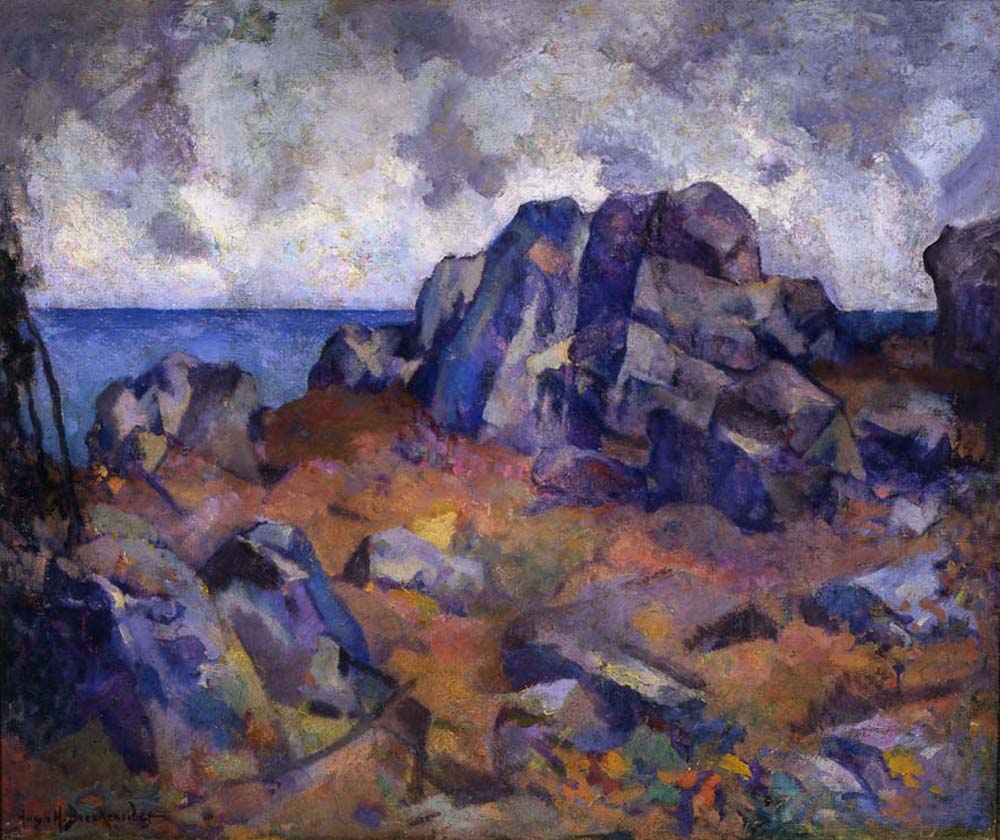
The Cape Ann Shore, 1924.
Cape Ann Museum, Gloucester, Massachusetts

== Bibliography ==
- Modern Chivalry
- The Rising Glory of America
- A Poem on Divine Revelation
- The Battle of Bunkers-Hill
- The Death of General Montgomery
- An Epistle to Walter Scott

== Notable students ==
- Walter Inglis Anderson
- Sarah Baker
- Walter Emerson Baum
- Maude Drein Bryant
- Arthur Beecher Carles
- Elizabeth Kitchenman Coyne
- Edith Emerson
- Nancy Maybin Ferguson
- Allan Freelon
- Ella Sophonisba Hergesheimer
- Marie Hull
- Thomas Lorraine Hunt
- Susette Schultz Keast
- Harriet Randall Lumis
- John Marin
- Delle Miller
- Fritz Pfeiffer
- Mary Elizabeth Price
- Leopold Seyffert
- Mary Given Sheerer
- Nan Sheets
- Ben Solowey
