= 1772 in poetry =

Nationality words link to articles with information on the nation's poetry or literature (for instance, Irish or France).

== Events ==
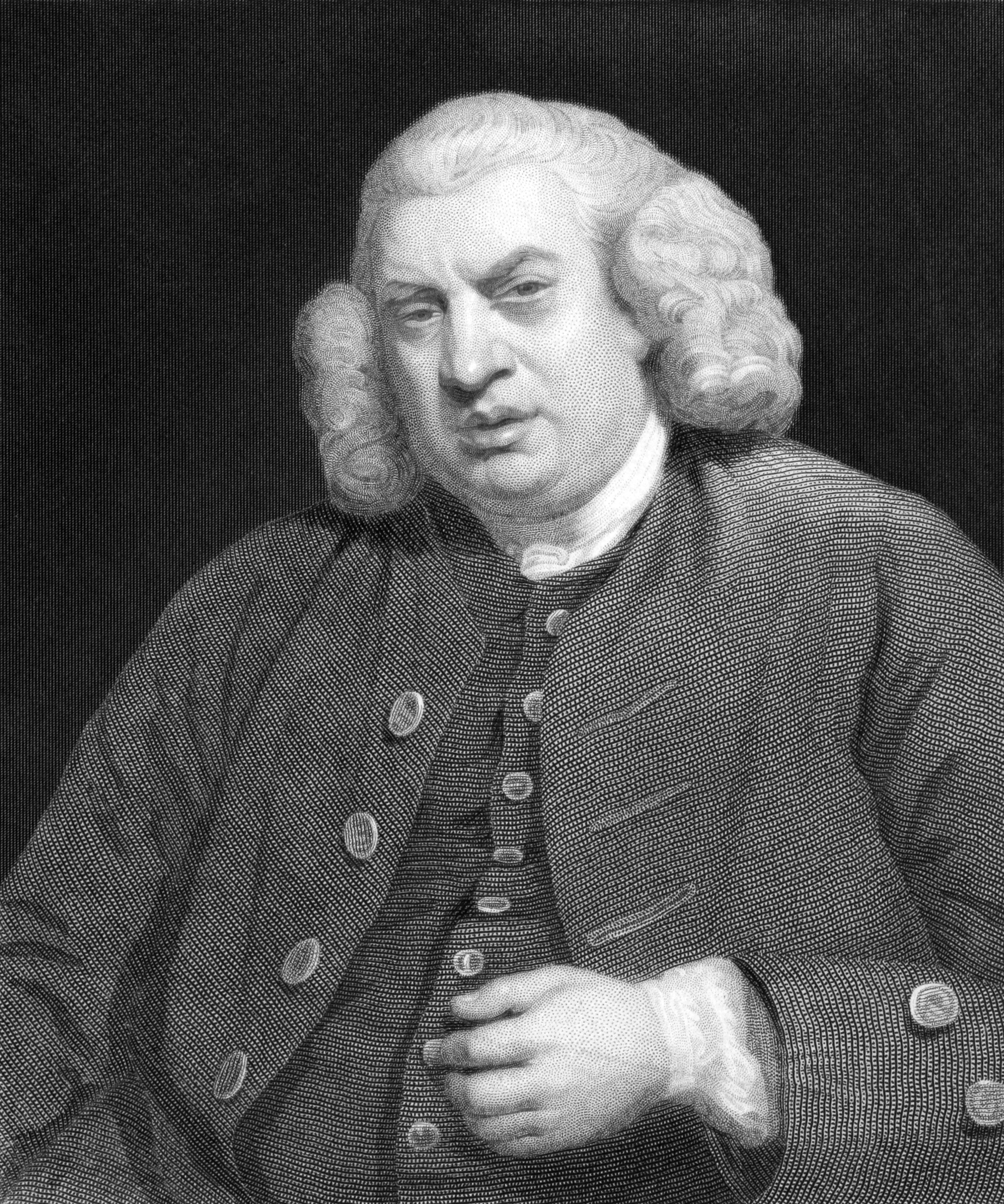
Samuel Johnson by Sir Joshua Reynolds, painted about this time

- February 29, March 14 and April 18 - Susanna Wheatley attempts to get subscribers for a book of poems by her slave, Phillis Wheatley, by advertising in the Boston Censor, but the effort fails, largely because not enough readers believe that a black person has enough talent to write poetry.
- September 12 - The Göttinger Hainbund of German poets is formed at a midnight ritual in an oaken grove.
- October 4 - Because many white people in colonial Massachusetts find it hard to believe that a black woman could have enough talent to write poetry, Phillis Wheatley is brought before a panel of eminent intellectuals in Boston who are gathered together to question her. The group includes John Erving, Reverend Charles Chauncey, John Hancock, Thomas Hutchinson, the governor of Massachusetts, his lieutenant governor, Andrew Oliver, the Rev. Mather Byles, Joseph Green, the Rev. Samuel Cooper, James Bowdoin and Samuel Mather. They conclude she has in fact written the poems ascribed to her and sign an attestation which is added to the preface to her book Poems on Various Subjects, Religious and Moral published in Aldgate, London in 1773 after printers in Boston refuse to publish the text.

== Works published ==
=== Colonial America ===
- Hugh Henry Brackenridge, with Philip Freneau, "A Poem on the Rising Glory of America"
- Timothy Dwight IV, "A Dissertation on the History, Eloquence, and Poetry of the Bible", criticism
- Nathaniel Evans, Poems on Several Occasions, with Some Other Compositions
- Philip Freneau, The American Village. To Which Are Added Several Other Original Pieces in Verse
- Francis Hopkinson, "Dirtilla"
- John Trumbull, The Progress of Dulness, published in three parts from this year to 1773

=== United Kingdom ===
- Mark Akenside, The Poems of Mark Akenside, posthumous
- Thomas Chatterton, The Execution of Sir Charles Bawdin, posthumously and anonymously published; attributed in another 1772 edition to "Thomas Rowlie", a fictional author invented by Chatterton
- Charles Jenner, Town Eclogues
- Sir William Jones, Poems from Asiatic Languages, published anonymously
- William Kenrick, Love in the Suds: A Town Eclogue
- William Mason, The English Garden, Volume 1 (an early draft privately printed for Mason in about 1771, all copies of which he later tried to destroy; Book the Second privately printed in 1776, trade edition 1777)
- Musae Seatonianae: A complete collection of the Cambridge prize poems, from the first institution of that premium by the Rev. Mr. Tho. Seaton, in 1750, to the present time. To which are added two poems, likewise written for the prize, Mr. [G.] Bally and Mr [J.] Scott, anthology of poems that won the annual Seatonian Prize at Cambridge University
- Christopher Smart, Hymns, for the Amusement of Children, published anonymously
- George Alexander Stevens, Songs, Comic and Satyrical

=== Other ===
- Solomon Gessner, Idyllen, a second volume (first volume 1756), Switzerland, German-language
- Martin Wieland, Golden Mirror, Germany

== Births ==
Death years link to the corresponding "[year] in poetry" article:

- March 10 - Karl Wilhelm Friedrich Schlegel (died 1829), German poet, literary critic, philosopher and philologist
- May 2 - Novalis (Georg Philipp Friedrich Freiherr von Hardenberg) (died 1801), German Romantic writer, poet, philosopher, mystic and civil engineer
- September 27 - Sándor Kisfaludy (died 1844), Hungarian Romantic lyric poet
- October 21 - Samuel Taylor Coleridge (died 1834), English Romantic poet, literary critic and philosopher, a founder of the Romantic Movement in England and one of the Lake Poets
- William Cliffton (died 1799), American
- Hồ Xuân Hương (died 1822), Vietnamese woman poet born at the end of the Lê dynasty

== Deaths ==
Birth years link to the corresponding "[year] in poetry" article:

- March 31 – Johann Jakob Thill (born 1747), German poet
- July 26 – James Graeme (born 1749), Scottish poet (tuberculosis)
- October 10 – William Wilkie (born 1721), Scottish poet

== See also ==
- List of years in poetry
- List of years in literature
- 18th century in poetry
- 18th century in literature
- French literature of the 18th century
- Sturm und Drang (the conventional translation is "Storm and Stress"; a more literal translation, however, might be "storm and urge", "storm and longing", "storm and drive" or "storm and impulse"), a movement in German literature (including poetry) and music from the late 1760s through the early 1780s
- List of years in poetry
- Poetry
