= Bradford Leavitt =

American minister (1868–1959)

The Reverend Bradford Leavitt
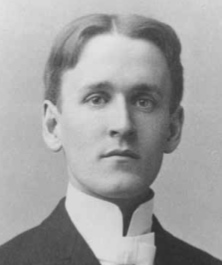
- Leavitt, c. 1896
- Born: Edwin Bradford Leavitt; June 4, 1868; Dorchester, Massachusetts, U.S.
- Died: October 21, 1959 (aged 91); Woodside, California, U.S.
- Education: Harvard University
- Occupations: Unitarian minister; civic leader; activist; businessman
- Known for: Leadership during the 1906 San Francisco earthquake
- Spouse: Grace Smith (m. 1892)
- Children: 1

Edwin Bradford Leavitt (June 4, 1868 – October 21, 1959) was an American Unitarian minister, civic leader, activist, and businessman. He was named pastor of San Francisco's First Unitarian Church in 1900 – six years before the San Francisco earthquake. Leavitt served the church during and after the disaster, earning a reputation for effective leadership.

During his time at First Unitarian, Leavitt also wrote editorials for The San Francisco Chronicle. Later the activist Leavitt exposed corruption in San Francisco's government, resulting in the Mayor's conviction on corruption charges, as well as the resignation of the city's entire Board of Supervisors.

== Early years ==
Leavitt was born in 1868 in Dorchester, Massachusetts, to Col. Charles Bradford Leavitt and his wife Emma Louisa (Bates) Leavitt, and attended Hingham High School in Hingham, Massachusetts, the home of his Leavitt ancestors. Leavitt's father Col. Leavitt served during the American Civil War as an officer in the 70th U.S. Colored Infantry as well as the 12th U.S. Colored Heavy Artillery, during which command he saw many engagements across the Deep South.

Bradford graduated from Harvard College in 1890 with a degree in English composition and philosophy, and from Harvard Divinity School in 1893, after which he was invited to become minister of the Unitarian Church in Brattleboro, Vermont. Leavitt accepted, turning down an invitation from the First Parish in Concord, Massachusetts. "Youthful, brilliant, with a mind trained by keen scientific observation, his message could not have failed to capture the attention of his hearers," wrote Mary Rogers Cabot in her Annals of Brattleboro, 1681–1895. Among Rev. Leavitt's earliest moves in his new ministry was helping found the Women's Alliance.

Leavitt served in Brattleboro until 1897, during which time he delivered sermons with titles like "Some Things which Astronomy Teaches about the Universe".

In 1897, Leavitt stepped down from his Brattleboro ministry when he was named pastor of First Unitarian Church, then known as All Souls' Church, in Washington, D.C., where he served three years. The church had been the worship place of several Presidents, and Leavitt's appointment was watched closely. In 1899 Leavitt delivered a eulogy to Vermont Senator Justin S. Morrill that demonstrated his lean speaking style, beginning with a simple sentence: "In moments of deepest emotion we are instinctively silent."

Leavitt's tenure at All Souls' began auspiciously. Nearly 1,000 worshippers regularly filled the church for two Sunday services, and the church found itself compelled to rent additional pews for the overflow. Word of Leavitt's intellectual ministry and powerful speaking style spread.

== San Francisco ministry ==
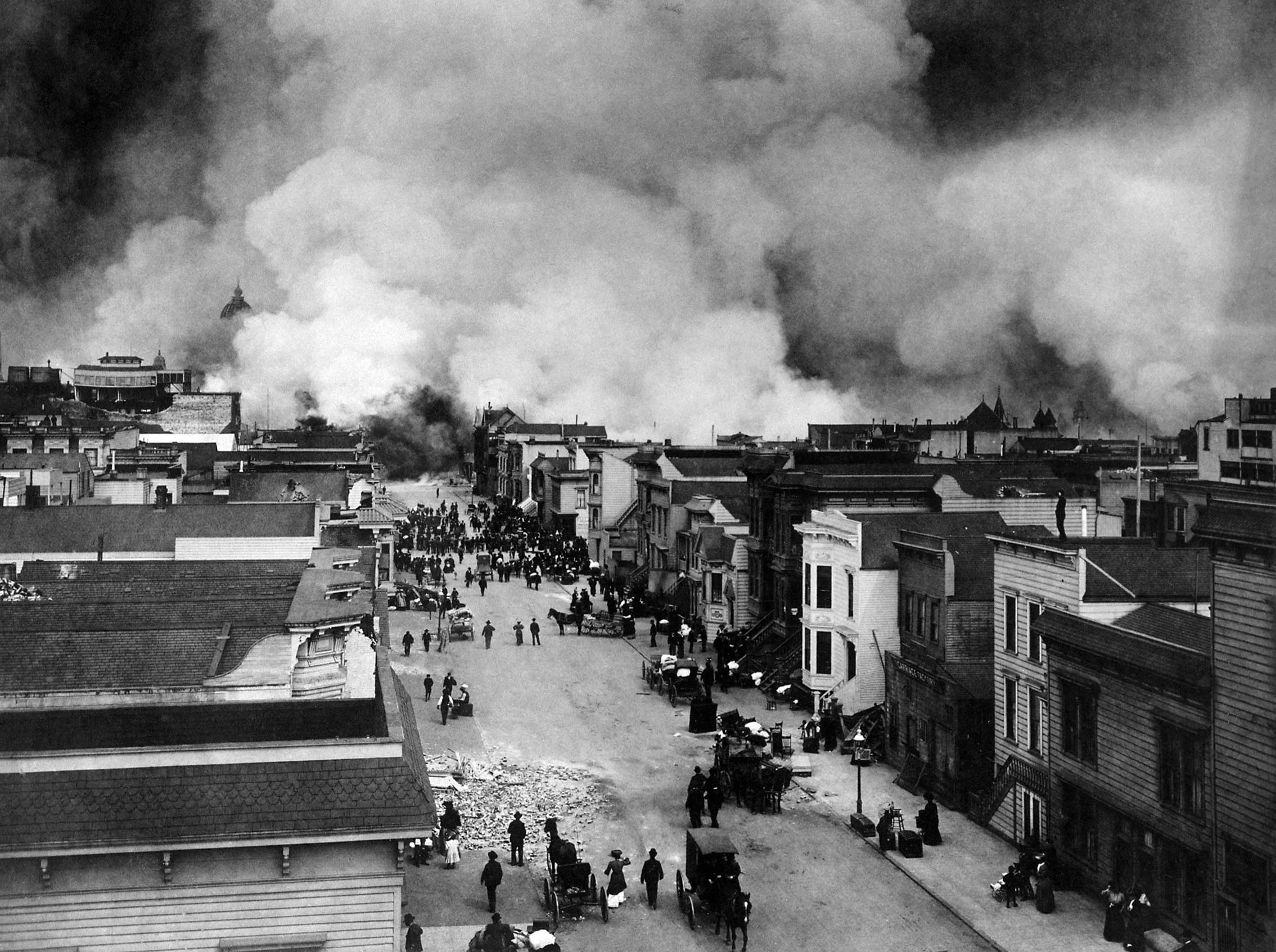
Aftermath, the 1906 San Francisco earthquake

In 1900, Leavitt was named minister of San Francisco's First Unitarian Church, succeeding the ill Rev. Dr. Horatio Stebbins. Minister Thomas Starr King, one of San Francisco's most beloved figures (commemorated in a large statue in Golden Gate Park) had served as the First Church's minister during the Civil War. Rev. Leavitt was named to the post on the church's fiftieth anniversary in 1900, and he held the pastorate for 13 eventful years. From the beginning, Rev. Leavitt sent a message of change. "The struggles of the coming century will be largely social," the pastor wrote on his acceptance of his new West Coast ministry. "Personal salvation will give way to social salvation.”

In 1903, Leavitt took the podium to address the convention of the California State Suffrage Association at Golden Gate Hall. By early 1906 Leavitt felt so confident of his mission that he wrote glowingly of the church's reinvigorated finances and activist social program. "Never in the history of this Coast has our situation been as promising as it is today," Leavitt wrote his parishioners.

Three months later everything changed. On April 18, 1906, the San Francisco earthquake hit the city, setting buildings alight, killing scores, devastating Leavitt's ministry, and despoiling his church. The tremors shook the church's bell from its tower, sending it careening through the roof, interrupting worship services for a considerable period. The earthquake also destroyed the homes of many communicants, as well as driving others from the devastated city. During the following years, Leavitt's pastoral presence was evident across the devastated Bay Area. In 1907, Leavitt was named one of the University preachers at the Memorial Church at the Leland Stanford Junior University in Palo Alto. (Leavitt subsequently served as a special preacher at the university, delivering the sermon on alternate Sundays during the academic year, and he gave several baccalaureate sermons at Stanford graduation services during his tenure at First Unitarian Church).

In the years following the earthquake, Leavitt became involved in a wide variety of charities, including the San Francisco Foundling Asylum, the San Francisco Relief and Red Cross Funds, and San Francisco Polytechnic. The Unitarian minister sat on the committee overseeing the city's hospitals, was a member of the Council of Associated Charities, and served on the advisory committee of the Independent League of Republican Clubs.

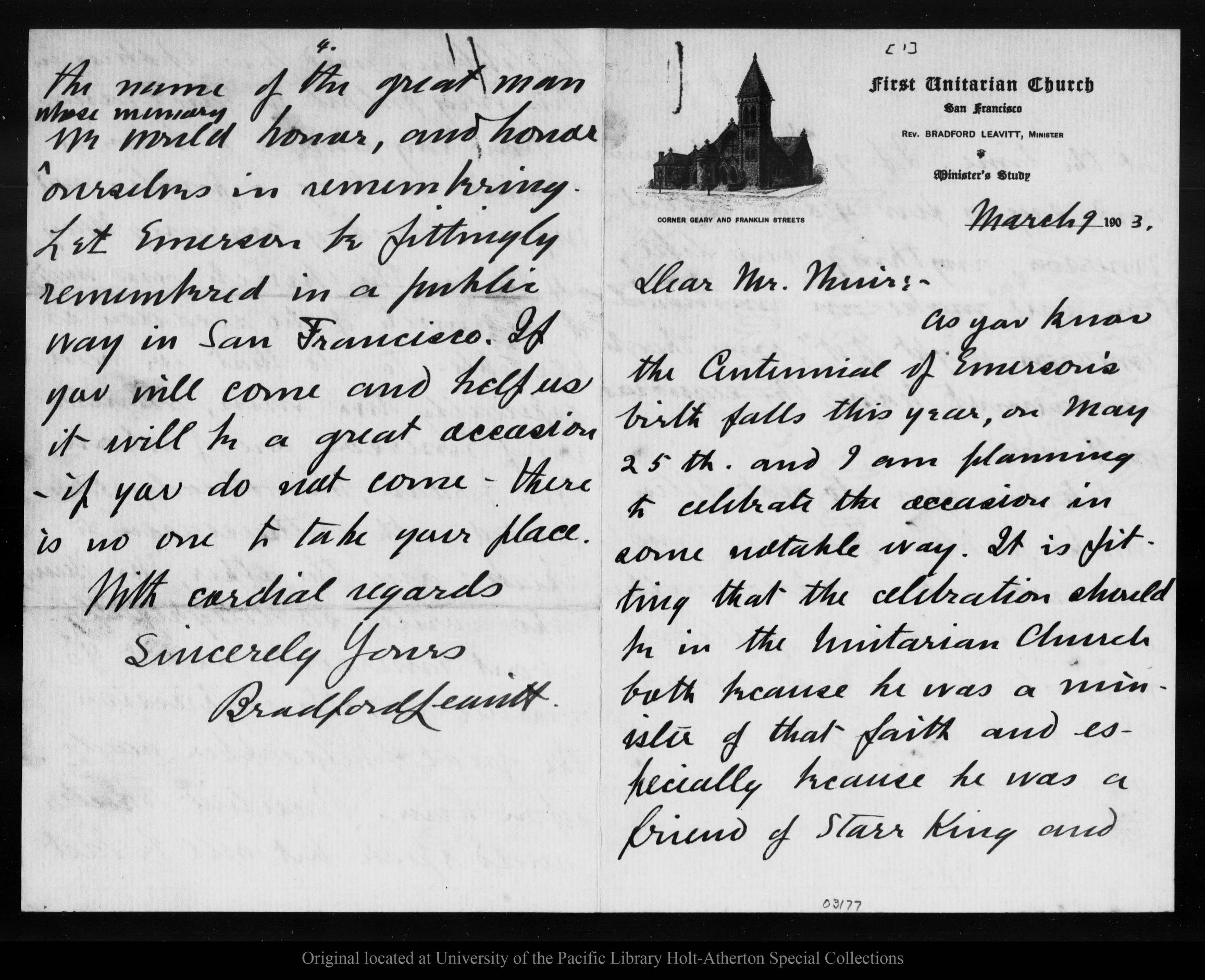
Letter from Rev. Bradford Leavitt to conservationist John Muir, inviting Muir to celebrations at First Unitarian Church for centennial of Ralph Waldo Emerson's birth. 1903

The San Francisco earthquake, Leavitt wrote his Harvard classmates, was the watershed event of his life: "I have been through the earthquake and fire and taken my part in the rehabilitation work, and now feel a bit the worse for wear, but wouldn't have missed it for an ordinary year or two of life."

During the same period, Leavitt continued speaking out on issues of the day. He spoke to a teachers' associations, telling them the new century's most profound event was the study of evolution. "The ministerial world now recognizes the latter (evolution)," Leavitt told the assembled history teachers, "and can now see evolution in the parable of the seed and its growth and in the work of Saint Paul." (Leavitt's speech on the subject preceded the famous Scopes Monkey Trial by more than a decade.)

In the years following the San Francisco earthquake, Rev. Leavitt worked with the city's mayor and civil service on relief work. But, ironically, Leavitt later turned against the Mayor and his lieutenants after his discovery of corruption at the highest levels of San Francisco's City Hall, which Leavitt later helped expose. The city's mayor was convicted in the investigation that followed, and the entire Board of Supervisors resigned in the wake of the scandal. "We have dreamed we were living under the government of laws," Leavitt wrote following the attempted assassination of Assistant San Francisco District Attorney Heney, who was investigating corruption Leavitt helped uncover, "whereas we were living under the government of newspapers hired by corrupt corporations, and the enemies of civic decency."

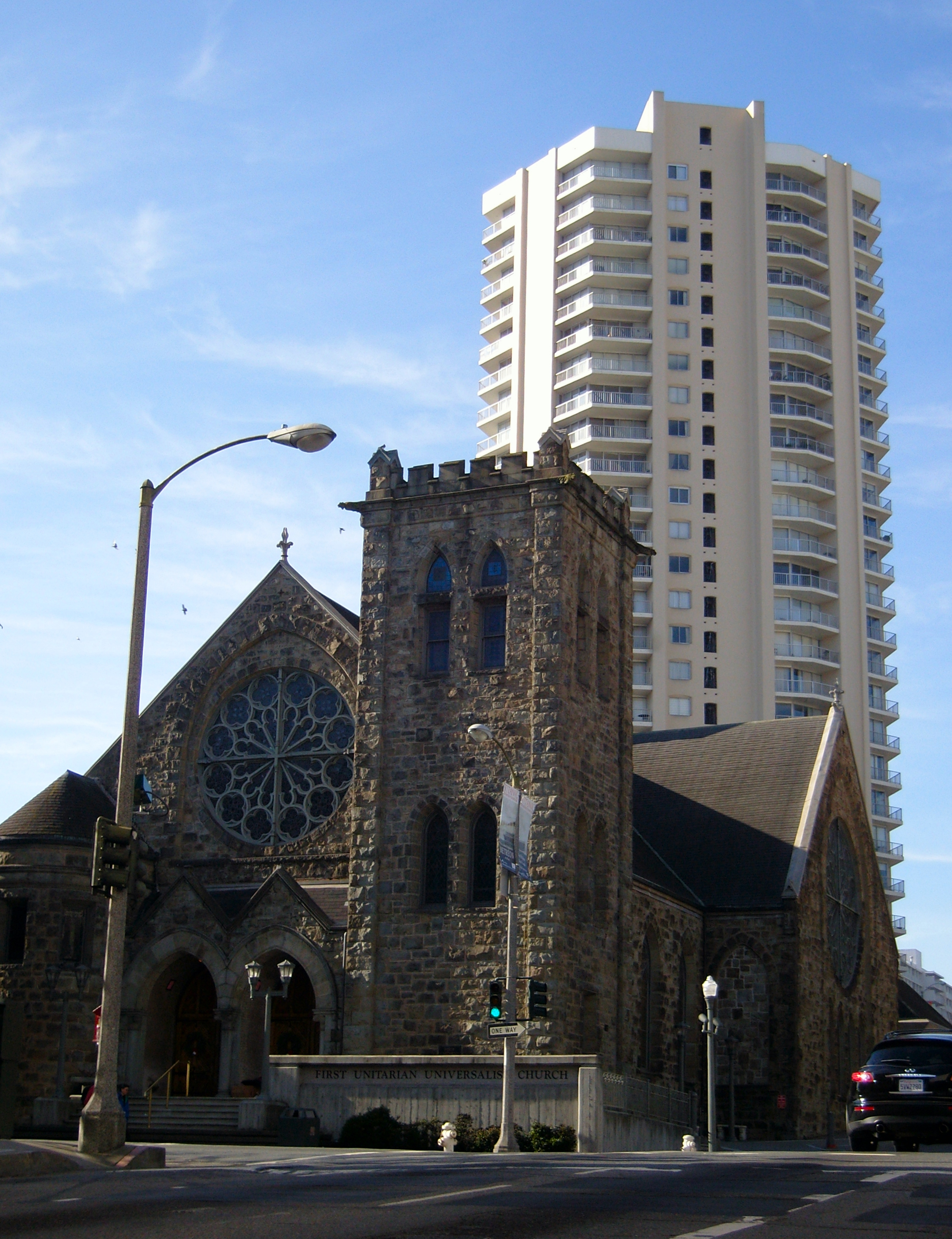
First Unitarian Universalist Church, San Francisco, Rev. Bradford Leavitt named pastor in 1900

== Post-ministry ==
Leavitt left the ministry for business in 1913 and became a successful San Francisco merchant, living at 2511 Octavia Street and at his ranch in Woodside, California, on the peninsula south of the city. After leaving the ministry, Leavitt worked for the firm of A.E.S. Thompson & Co. in the commission business at 24 California Street.

Near the end of his life, the former minister turned undertaking entrepreneur, helping run the business of undertakers N. Gray & Co., where he became vice president of the mortuary's South San Francisco and Burlingame operations – a job change that engendered considerable controversy. But Leavitt was accustomed to controversy: in his career as a businessman, he had worked with inventor R.B. Fageol to create one of America's earliest automotive companies, founded in Oakland, California, a venture that later failed.

The progressive Leavitt remained loyal to his alma mater, serving with the Harvard Club of San Francisco. He was also a member of the Commonwealth Club. Edwin Bradford Leavitt (who later dropped his first name) was married to Grace Wentworth (née Smith) in Boston on May 9, 1892. They had one daughter, Helen.

Leavitt's views were best summarized in an address he gave to the graduating class of the College of Physicians and Surgeons of San Francisco on May 19, 1904, at the Alhambra Theater on the cusp of the quake that decimated the city. "People might be divided into three classes," Leavitt told the graduates. "First, those that never think, but follow some routine because of birth, inheritance, associations, environment and convenience. Second, those who think they think, but are, of necessity, very superficial. And the third class which, (I) am sorry to say, is the smallest numerically, the real thinkers."

As a minister, Leavitt had little truck with dogma: he might have been called an ecclesiastical existentialist. "If Christianity is not creed but character", Leavitt told his barber, "not a theory but a life, then it would seem that those who follow the teachings of Christ, with a theory or without one, are entitled to be called Christians."
