= Lumis =

Lumis is a surname. Notable people with the surname include:

- Dexter Lumis (born 1984), real name Samuel Shaw, American wrestler
- Harriet Randall Lumis (1870–1953), American landscape painter
- Karo Lumis (born 1980), Papua New Guinean woman cricketer

== See also ==
- Loomis (surname)
