= Kibbey =

Kibbey is a surname. Notable people with the surname include:

- Ephraim Kibbey (1754/1756–1809), American Revolutionary War soldier
- Ilah Marian Kibbey (1883–1957), American genre and landscape painter
- John Franklin Kibbey (1826-1900), American lawyer and politician
- Joseph Henry Kibbey (1853–1924), American attorney and judge

== See also ==
- Kibbey Canyon, valley in Montana
- Kibbey Formation, subdivision of the Big Snowy Group
