= Isabelle Clark Percy West =

American artist (1882–1976)

- Born: Isabelle Clark Percy; November 6, 1882; Alameda, California, U.S.
- Died: August 25, 1976 (aged 93); Greenbrae, California, U.S.
- Other names: Isabelle Percy, Isabelle Percy West, Isabelle Clark Percy–West
- Education: Mark Hopkins Institute of Art, Teachers College, Columbia University
- Occupation(s): Painter, lithographer, etcher, designer, educator
- Known for: Founding faculty of the California College of the Arts
- Spouse: George Parsons West
- Father: George W. Percy

Isabelle Clark Percy West (née Percy; 1882 – 1976) was an American painter, printmaker, designer, and educator. She was known for landscape paintings, botanical paintings, and early etchings of the Pacific Coast. She was part of the founding faculty of California College of the Arts in Oakland, California.

== Early life and education ==
Isabelle Clark Percy was born on November 6, 1882, in Alameda, California. Her mother was Emma Washburn (née Clark) was from Portland, Maine, from a family that descended from the Mayflower colonists. Her father was George W. Percy a noted San Francisco architect from Bath, Maine. She grew up in Oakland, California; with a break from 1894 until 1896 to attended the Fort Wayne School for Girls in Portland, Maine.

Percy studied at the Mark Hopkins Institute of Art (later known as San Francisco Art Institute), in San Francisco, under Arthur Frank Mathews. She continued her studies under Henry Bayley Snell in New York City. She went on to attend Columbia University, where she studied under Arthur Wesley Dow. Percy graduated from the Art Department of Teachers College, Columbia University in 1907. After graduation, she travelled and studied in Europe for a few years. In England, she studied under Welsh artist, Frank Brangwyn.

She married George Parsons West, a newspaperman, in 1916.

== Career ==
=== Artwork ===
In the 1910s, when "On the Pacific Coast, the profession being in its infancy...there are many encouraging creditable productions that command favorable consideration, among them...Helen Hyde and Isabelle Percy with their pictorial colored prints", Percy was recognized for her etchings.

In 1911, she received an honorable mention at the Paris Salon. In 1915, Percy won a bronze medal for her lithographic print at the Panama Pacific International Exposition in San Francisco.

=== Teaching ===
In 1925, when the California School of Arts and Crafts completed its move from Berkeley to a new Oakland campus at the corner of Broadway and College Avenue, West made the move as well and was named as one of "the school's faculty of highly trained specialists" in the Western Journal of Education (1925).

== Legacy ==
Percy West died on August 25, 1976 in Greenbrae, California.

In 1968, the "Isabelle Percy West Gallery" was completed in the topmost level of Founders Hall which was built on the Treadwell Mansion-Oakland campus of California College of Arts and Crafts, to honor founding faculty of the college.

Percy West's work is held in collections at Mills College Art Museum in Oakland, California.

== Exhibitions ==
Percy West exhibited nationally in San Francisco, Philadelphia, Chicago, Hawaii and New York as well as internationally in Paris and Germany.

- 1915, Panama Pacific International Exposition, San Francisco, California; her lithography work was included
- 1928, The Academy of Arts, Honolulu (now the Honolulu Museum of Art), Honolulu, Hawaii; Percy West's paintings of landscapes and Hawaiian flowers were featured in an exhibit of Hawaiian Paintings
- 2020, Feminizing Permanence, Saint Mary's College Museum of Art, Moraga, California
