= Delle Miller =

American artist (1875–1932)

- Born: Adele Helene Miller; 1875; Independence, Kansas
- Died: September 17, 1932 (aged 56–57); Kansas City, Missouri
- Education: Fine Arts Institute of Kansas City; Chicago Art Institute; Pennsylvania Academy of Fine Arts
- Occupations: Educator, Painter

Adele Helene “Delle” Miller (1875-1932) was an American artist, craftswoman, and teacher. She was trained as a painter in the impressionist style and enjoyed being in nature. Miller was born in Kansas, but spent most of her life in Kansas City, Missouri. Throughout her lifetime, she worked with various media, including metalworking and oil paints. Among her painting instructors were Hugh H. Breckenridge, Arthur Wesley Dow, and Daniel Garber.

== Early life and education ==
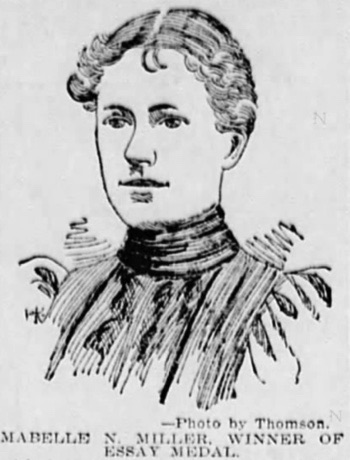
Illustration of Delle's sister Mabelle

Miller was born in Independence, Kansas. She had at least one sibling, a sister named Mabelle (sometimes Maybelle) M. Miller. Their father was a physician and real-estate businessman, Henry Miller. Both Mabelle and Delle were members of the Philomathean Alumnae Association. She studied art at the Fine Arts Institute of Kansas City, the Chicago Art Institute, and the Pennsylvania Academy of Fine Arts. Miller was a pupil of artists Hugh H. Breckenridge, Arthur Wesley Dow, and Daniel Garber. She studied under Breckenridge for three summers she spent in Gloucester.

== Career ==
By 1909, Miller was an instructor at the Kansas City Art Institute. While at the Art Institute, she was listed in two departments: metal work and jewelry. By 1921, she was an art teacher at Central High School where she gained some experience as a playwright, writing a play that depicted a day in the life of Rembrandt. In 1926, Miller's work, along with Coah Henry and Ilah Marian Kibbey, were displayed in an exhibition at the Southwest Missouri State Teachers college (now Missouri State University). In 1926, the Springfield News-Leader referred to Miller as one of the "leading women artists of the day".

Miller was a member of several professional societies including the National Association of Women Painters and Sculptors, Kansas City Society of Art, the North Shore Art Association, Kansas City Arts and Crafts, the Western Art Association, and the Gloucester Society of Artists. She had a tenure as president of the Kansas City Society of Artists.

== Awards and honors ==
In 1929, Miller was awarded "Best work in oil" at the Fine Arts Exhibit, which was part of the Missouri State Fair.

== Death ==
Miller died on September 17, 1932, in Kansas City.

== Modern value ==
In 2019, an oil painting by Miller appeared on the television program Antiques Roadshow where its value was appraised by Deborah Spanierman. Spanierman said, "When I compare it to other male artists...she just stands right up to those other male artists who were painting at that time." Spanierman estimated the retail price of the art as US$25,000.

== Works ==
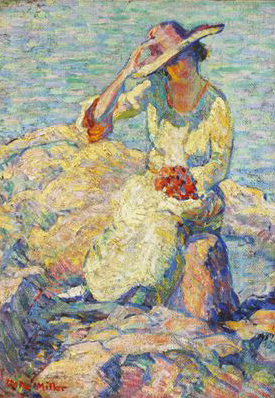
Sunny Day, Gloucester

- "Beach Scene at Ocean Grove"
- "Sunny Day, Gloucester"
- "The Storm King": Judged the best painting at the Missouri State Fair
- "Unconquered": selected as a farewell gift to Missouri State University by the senior class in 1927
- "Morning Light of the Harbor"
- "The Doorstep Garden"
- "A New England Lane"
- "The Inner Harbor"
- "The Bridges at Lawrence"
- "The Kaw Valley"
- "Mrs. Brook's Greenhouse"
- "Haskell from Mount Oread"
- "The Rice House"
- "The Pi Phi Garden"
- "Dyche Museum"
