= Ben Solowey =

American artist

Ben Solowey (1900–1978) was an American artist, known for his sculpture, painting, and drawing.

== Biography ==
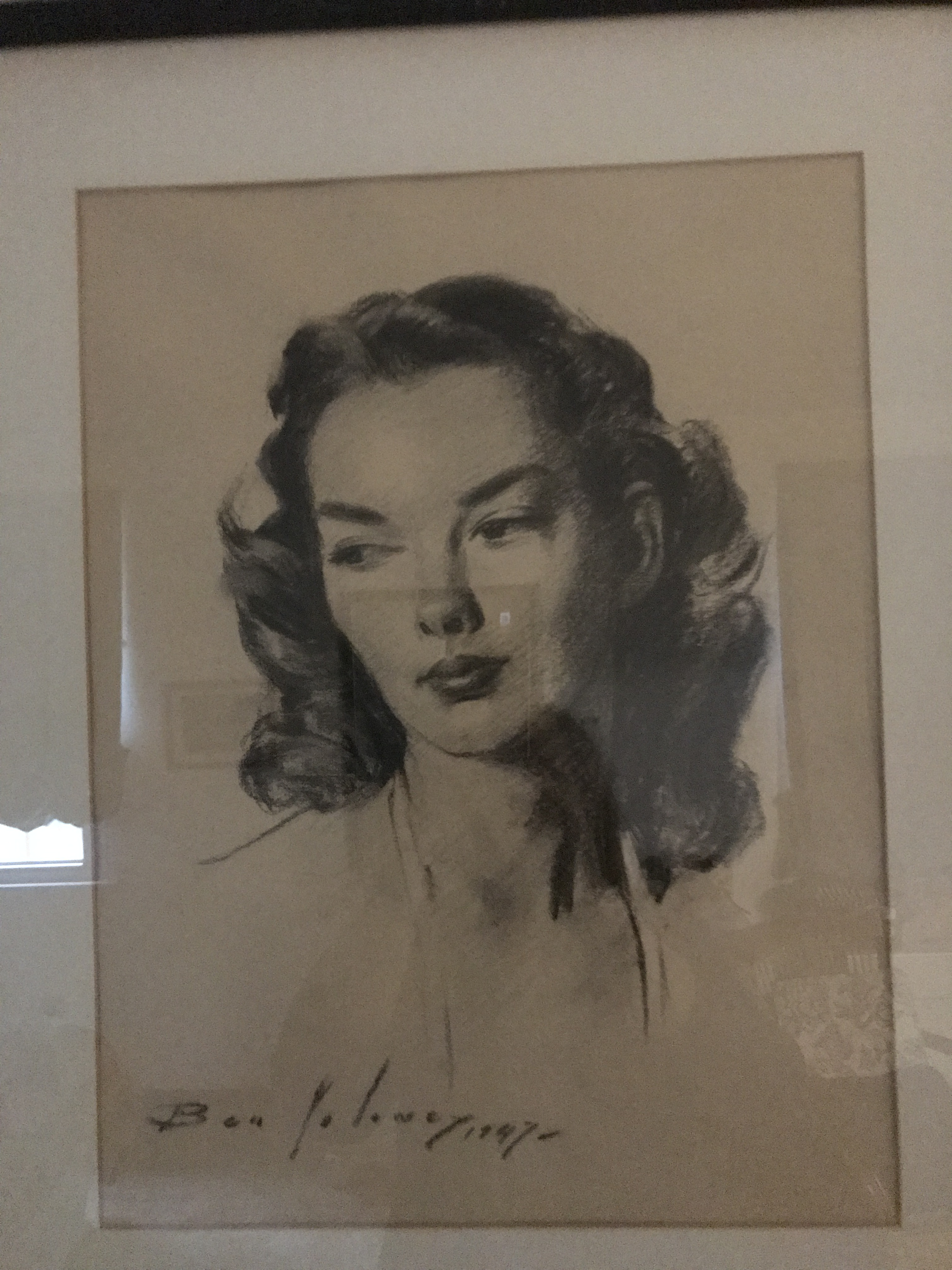
Drawing of Reva Veis, niece of Rae Landis Solowey, by artist Ben Solowey

Solowey was born in Warsaw, Poland on August 29, 1900. In 1907, his family moved to St. Petersburg, Russia, then, when he was fourteen, to Philadelphia. There he studied under Hugh H. Breckenridge and Daniel Garber at the Pennsylvania Academy of the Fine Arts, from which he graduated in 1923. In 1924, he took a job as ship's steward on the SS Leviathan so that he could go to London and Paris to see both old masters and more recent masterpieces of Impressionism and Post-Impressionism. He was influenced by French artists from Delacroix and Courbet to the impressionists and more modern painters such as Cézanne, as well as the sculptor Auguste Rodin.

In 1925, Solowey returned to Philadelphia, where he worked as a decorative painter. He moved to New York in 1928, where he was commissioned by The New York Times and the Herald Tribune to capture the likenesses of Broadway and Hollywood celebrities. Of these, he sketched Ethel Barrymore, Fanny Brice, Claudette Colbert, Katharine Cornell, Marlene Dietrich, Helen Hayes, Katharine Hepburn, Walter Huston, George S. Kaufman, Mary Nash, Lily Pons, and Basil Rathbone. Because of their busy schedules, he often had to complete his charcoal drawings in as little as 15 minutes while the actors were on break between rehearsals.

In 1930, after a brief courtship, he married Rae Landis, who became his primary model. In 1942, the couple moved to a secluded farm in Bucks County, Pennsylvania. There, Solowey would spend the rest of his days, restoring the ancient farmhouse and painting.

His studio in Bedminster Township, Pennsylvania is maintained as a museum.
