= Somerset Academy Archaeological Site =

- Somerset Academy
- U.S. National Register of Historic Places
- Nearest city: Princess Anne, Maryland
- NRHP reference No.: 86002356
- Added to NRHP: September 11, 1986

Somerset Academy Archaeological Site is an archeological site located at Princess Anne, Somerset County, Maryland. Somerset Academy was a large and important private school that operated between the years 1767 and 1797. It is the only archeologically identified late-colonial school site known for the state of Maryland.

Hugh Henry Brackenridge, later founder of the University of Pittsburgh and Pittsburgh Gazette, was one of the headmasters of the school. Philip Freneau also taught there.

It was listed on the National Register of Historic Places in 1986.
