= Walter King Stone =

American painter (1875–1949)

Walter King Stone (1875–1949) was an American artist and illustrator, teaching art at Cornell University.

== Early life and education ==
Stone was born in Barnard, Monroe County, New York, on March 2, 1875, the son of William Talmage and Jenny Filer Stone. He attended public school in Rochester and in 1894 moved to Brooklyn to attend Pratt Institute. He initially studied drawing under Ida C. Haskell and in 1895 he was a student of Arthur Wesley Dow and adopted Dow's tonalist style. Stone noted that everything he'd done as an artist he owed to Dow and called him a "born teacher." Stone's technique involved the use of water color over a base drawing in charcoal, applied in simple masses and few colors. This method was ideally suited to the improved methods of reproduction.

== The Illustrator ==
For two years he was a keeper in the aviary at the Washington Zoo, making drawings and befriending two important zoological illustrators: Charles Livingston Bull and Louis Agassiz Fuertes. By 1900 he'd moved to New York and was active as an independent illustrator, painter and writer, winning widespread recognition for his nature illustrations. His work appeared in Scribner’s Magazine, Century Magazine, Colliers’, Outing, Country Life in America, St. Nicholas, and in the Country Gentleman, as well as in various books.

Stone made four trips to Europe visiting France, Belgium, Holland, Germany and England. On his trip to Germany in 1908 he made illustrations for Frederic van Beuren's "Black Forest Pathways" for Scribner's Magazine. In the same issue appeared a story by Walter Prichard Eaton and Stone immediately wrote to him, suggesting a collaboration. Their works varied widely, including a story of New York harbor, and in 1916, Glacier National Park. The Eaton-Stone party ventured into the park by pack train and Stone provided artwork for Eaton's stories, working from Many-Glaciers Hotel, then recently built by the Great Northern Railroad. Also visiting Glacier during this season were author Mary Roberts Rinehart and artists John Singer Sargent and Charles M. Russell. On his return he exhibited a work titled 'Grinnell Glacier' at the First Annual Society of Independent Artists show in New York City.

While in New York Stone became a member of the Salmagundi Club, exhibiting works there regularly through the 1930s. In 1918 he exhibited with the Society of Independent Artists in Brooklyn, alongside Reynolds Beal, Pablo Picasso, and his mentor Arthur Wesley Dow.

== The Teacher ==
Stone began teaching at Cornell University as Acting Professor of Drawing in 1920, as Assistant Professor beginning in 1922, as Associate Professor in 1942, and as Associate Professor Emeritus from 1943.

He still took time for painting trips. In 1927 he traveled to Wyoming, staying at the IXL 'dude' ranch, near Dayton. Works from this trip were subsequently shown at the Arnot Gallery in Elmira, New York, in 1929. In 1928-29 he took a leave of absence and traveled to California, where he painted in Muir Woods, Deep Springs Valley and Death Valley. Stone exhibited 25 landscapes from this trip at the Stanford University Art Gallery. Some of the work from this trip also appears in a Good Housekeeping story with Alice Adams Means and in his biography. Stone's works from this trip exhibit a higher-key palette and more impressionistic brushwork, much like the California Impressionists of the day.

Stone exhibited his works throughout the northeast and had recurring shows at the Stockbridge Casino (alongside the many fine artists of the Boston School), the Arnot Museum in Elmira, New York, beginning in 1929, and in Washington DC at the Arts Club in 1924, and at the Smithsonian Natural History Museum in 1943.

His works are exhibited at the Herbert F. Johnson Museum of Art at Cornell University.

Stone died in Ithaca, New York, in 1949.

== Legacy ==
Cornell University established the Edith and Walter King Stone Memorial Prize, awarded to B.F.A. students in their junior year based on accomplishment and promise in the field of art.

== Gallery ==
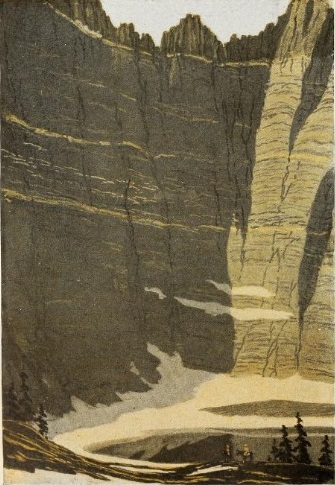
From "Harper's Weekly" 1917, "Magnificent Battlements".

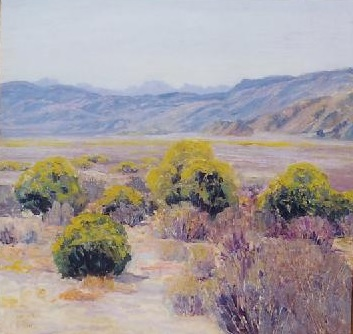
Rabbitbrush in the Desert - California, 1928

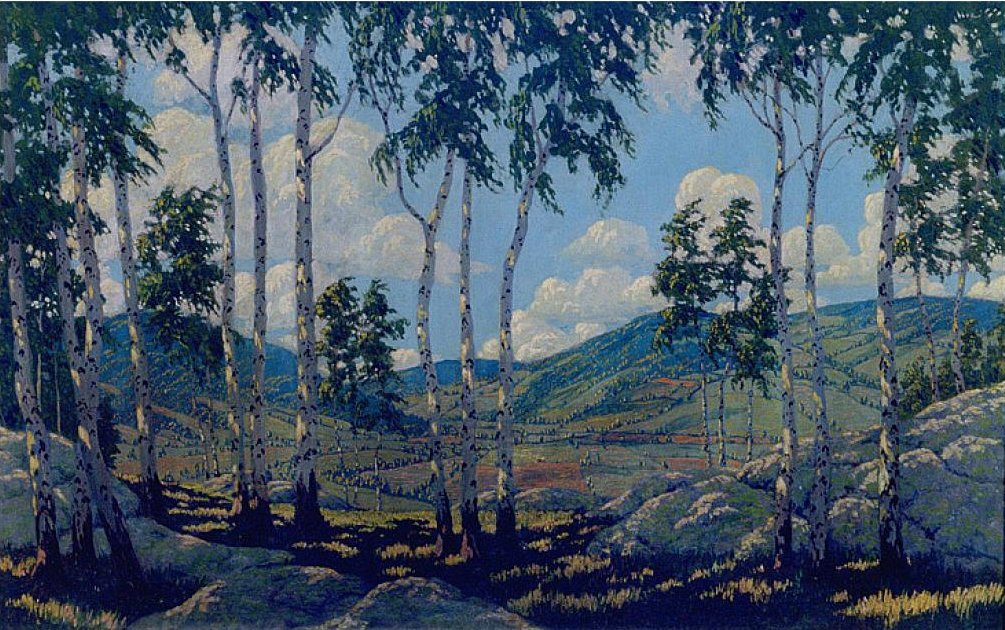
Untitled landscape by Walter King Stone, 1939
