= Alameda Free Library =

- U.S. National Register of Historic Places
- Official logo

- Location within Oakland, California Location within California Location within the United States
- Location: 2264 Santa Clara Ave., Alameda, California
- Coordinates: 37°45′57″N 122°14′33″W
- Area: 0.2 acres (0.081 ha)
- Built: 1902
- Architects: C. H. Foster & Son
- Architectural style: Mixed
- NRHP reference No.: 82002152
- Added to NRHP: June 25, 1982

The Alameda Free Library is the city library of Alameda, California.

== Carnegie library ==
Alameda's Carnegie library was built from 1902 to 1903 and was the first designated building for the city's library, which had been housed in various other buildings since 1877. The library was added to the National Register of Historic Places on June 25, 1982. The Alameda Free Library is located across the street from the Alameda City Hall, another NRHP-listed site.

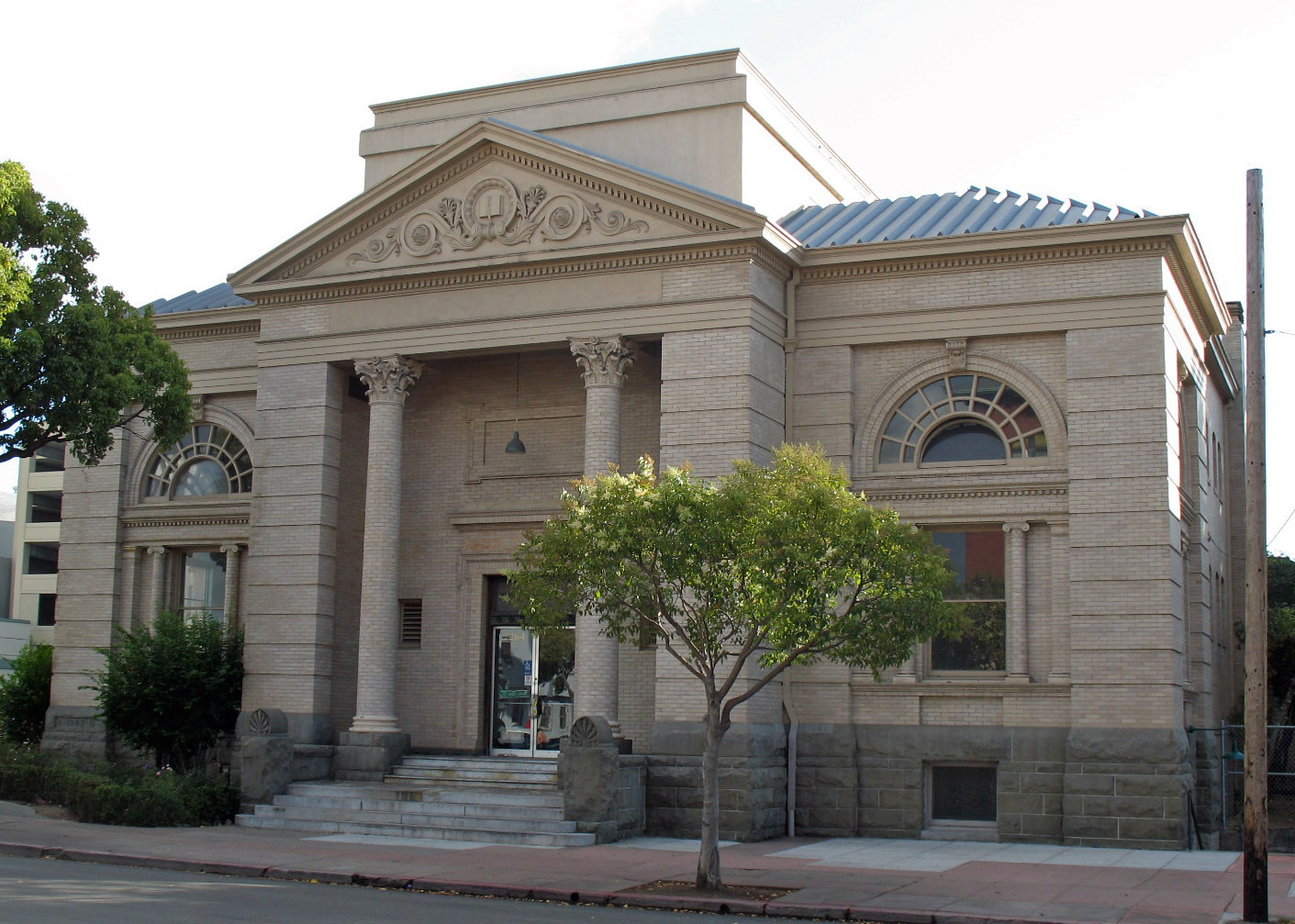
Alameda Free Library building

C. H. Foster and his son G. J. Foster designed the building in an eclectic blend of multiple architectural styles, including Neoclassical, Renaissance Revival, and Baroque Revival. The two-story building is faced with pressed and molded buff brick outside of its basement, which was built in gray sandstone.

The library's front has a portico with two brick columns and a frieze with a decorative tympanum displaying an open book; the columns were the first of their kind in California. The building's entrance is located within the portico atop sets of marble and granite stairs. A pair of windows appears to each side of the entrance; the top window in each pair is arched, while the bottom one is rectangular and flanked by columns. The metal hipped roof of the library has a raised glass skylight. The library's main room is on the second story, which can be reached by a marble staircase; the main room contains five stained glass windows on its south wall.

== New main library building ==
The current main library is located at 1550 Oak St.

An attempt to pass a parcel tax to build a new main Alameda Free Library failed in 1996. In 2000, Alameda voters passed Measure O to approve a bond to pay for a new main library building. A California state bond measure provided matching funds to cover the new building's total cost of $26.1 million. Construction began in 2005 and the new main library opened in 2006.

== See also ==
- National Register of Historic Places listings in Alameda County, California
