= First Unitarian Church (San Francisco) =

Historic church building in San Francisco

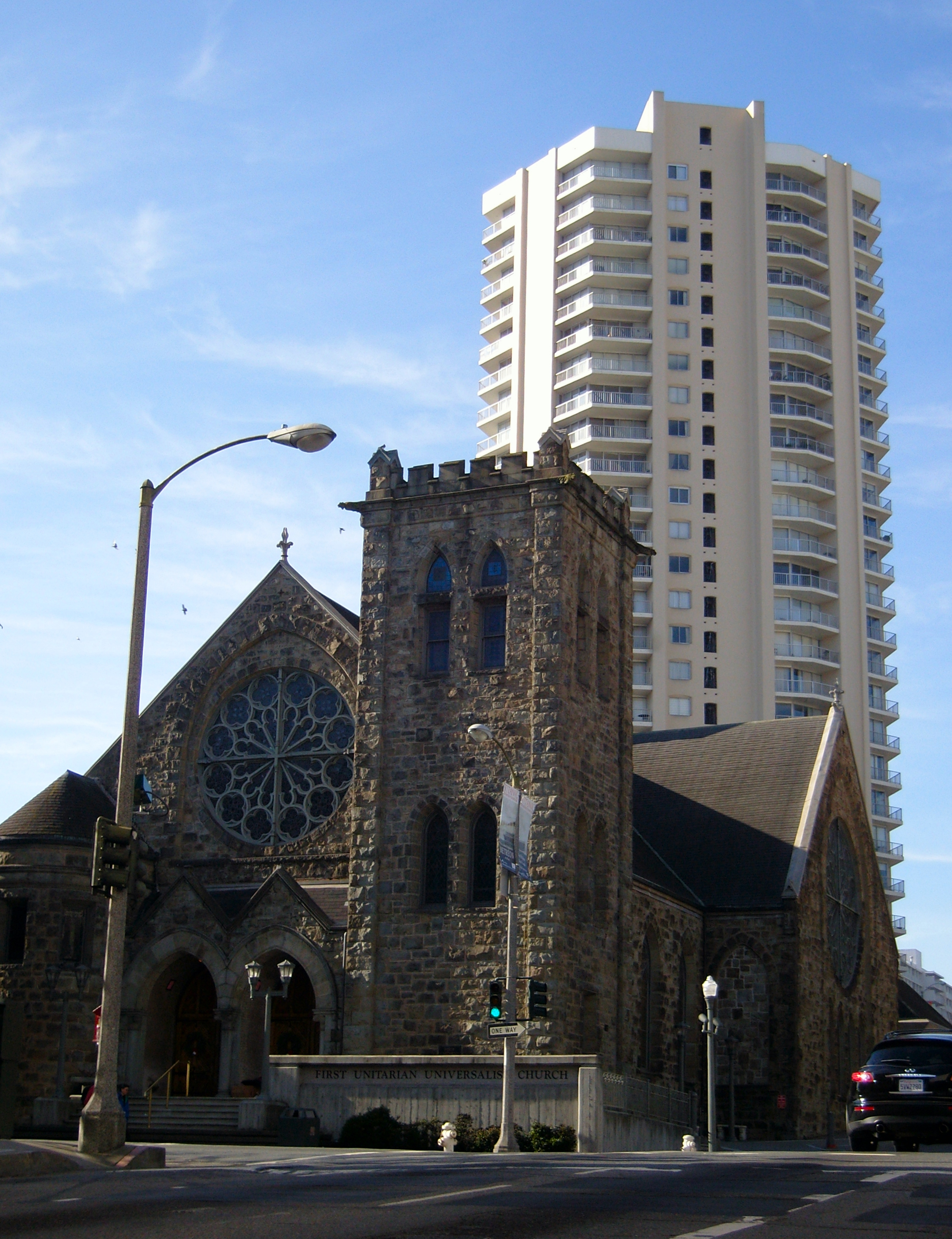

- Location in San Francisco County Location in California Location in United States
- 37.785411°N 122.423166°W
- Location: 1187 Franklin Street, San Francisco, California, U.S.

History
- Built: 1889

Site notes
- Architect: Percy & Hamilton

San Francisco Designated Landmark
- Designated: 10 July 1971
- Reference no.: 40

The First Unitarian Church is a church structure built in 1889 and is located at 1187 Franklin Street at Geary Street in the Cathedral Hill neighborhood, San Francisco, California. It is also known the First Unitarian Universalist Church and First Unitarian Universalist Society of San Francisco, and is nicknamed "Starr King's church".

== History ==
The Unitarians built their first San Francisco Church in 1853 at 805 Stockton Street. When the congregation outgrew the first building within a decade, a new church was built on Union Square at 133 Geary Street, under clergyman Thomas Starr King, who was instrumental in advocating for California to join the Union. Thomas Starr King died in 1864 and his sarcophagus still remains is on the grounds of the church.

In 1889, the church was moved to 1187 Franklin Street, its current location. The building was designed by architects Percy & Hamilton in the Richardson Romanesque-style. After the 1906 San Francisco earthquake, the bell tower was rebuilt.

Prominent members associated with the early days of the church in San Francisco were James Otis, Leland Stanford, Bret Harte, Andrew Smith Hallidie, and Ralph Waldo Emerson. Later members of the congregation included Julia Ward Howe and Edward Everett Hale. Other ministers after Starr King at this church included Horatio Stebbins (1821–1902) serving from 1864 to 1900; Bradford Leavitt (born 1868) serving from 1900 to 1949; Harry C. Meserve (1914–2000), serving from 1949 to 1957; and Harry Barron Scholefield (1914–2003) serving from 1957 to 1975.

== See also ==
- List of San Francisco Designated Landmarks
- First Unitarian Church (Berkeley, California)
- First Unitarian Church of Oakland
- Starr King School for the Ministry
