= Alameda City Hall =

Historic building in California, US

- U.S. National Register of Historic Places
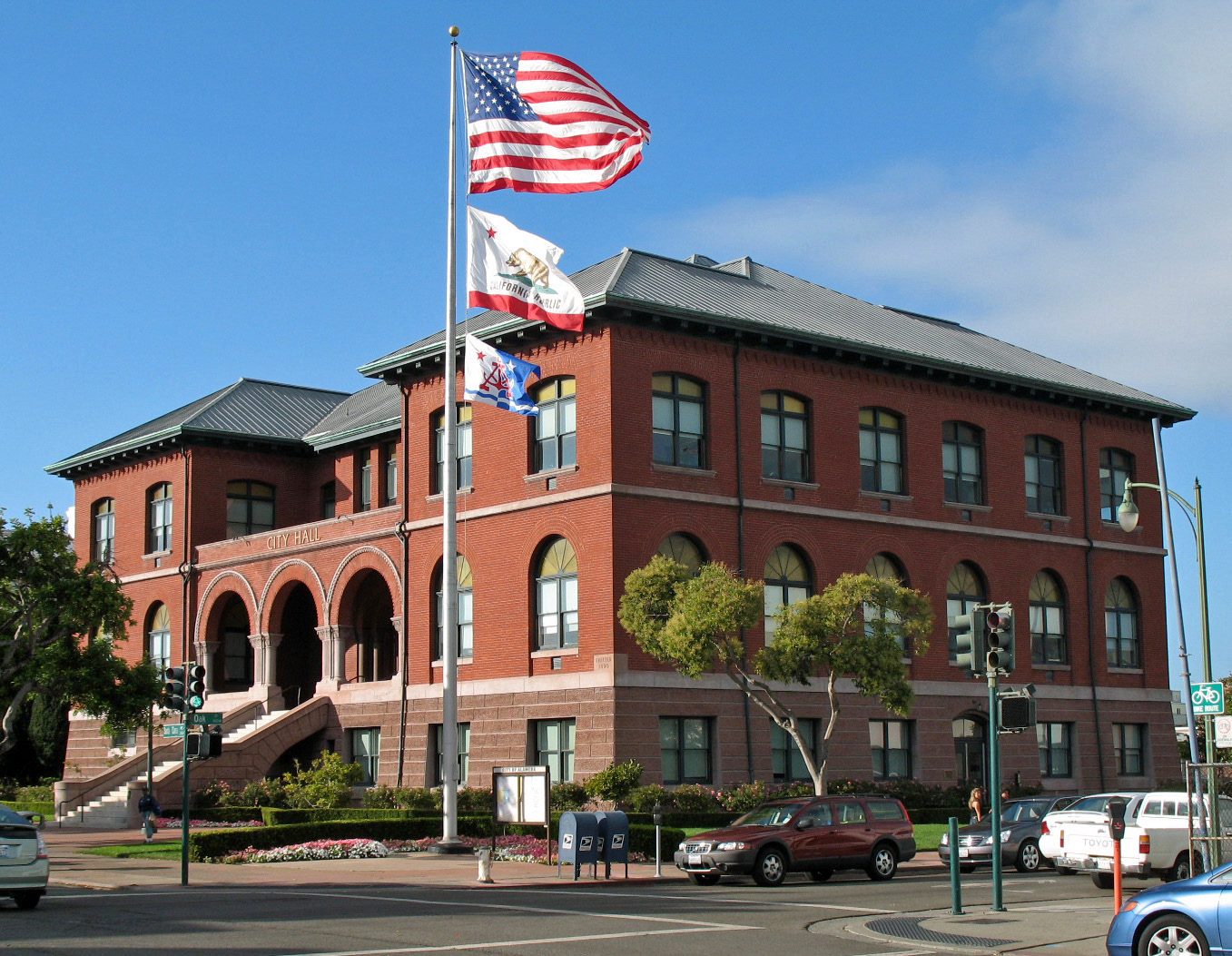

- Location within Oakland, California Location within California Location within the United States
- Location: 2263 Santa Clara Ave., Alameda, Alameda County, California, U.S.
- Coordinates: 37°45′59″N 122°14′35″W
- Built: 1895
- Architects: Percy & Hamilton, Thomas Day & Son
- Architectural style: Romanesque
- NRHP reference No.: 80000791
- Added to NRHP: October 14, 1980

Alameda City Hall is a historic city hall civic building in Alameda, California. The building has been continually used since it was first built in 1895. It has a historical marker erected in 1998 by the Native Sons of the Golden West; and is listed as one of the National Register of Historic Places since 1980.

== History ==
The Alameda City Hall was built in 1895, and remains from the city's initial period of economic prosperity that was created by the expansion of the railroad network on the end of the 19th century. It was constructed some twenty years after the city charter was established in 1872. The city of Alameda was the first in California, and the second in the nation to operate its own power plant which opened a few years prior in 1886. Alameda City Hall was designed with incandescent lighting in the late-19th century, which was considered a luxury at that time. The building is a three-story, masonry structure with a hipped roof.

The Romanesque Revival style building was designed by George Percy of the firm of Percy and Hamilton. Thomas Day and Sons built the structure. The firm of Percy & Hamilton designed roughly 200 buildings in the San Francisco Bay Area, including the notable Cantor Arts Center at Stanford University, and the Children's Playhouse or Children's Quarters (now known as the Koret Children's Playground) in Golden Gate Park.

The Alameda City Hall is located across the street from the Alameda Free Library, another NHRP-listed site.

== Architecture ==
The Alameda City Hall is a three-story, masonry structure with a hipped roof. The two upper stories rest on a ground floor with slightly battered walls and a concrete surface that is rusticated to simulate sandstone. The ground floor terminates in a water table. Square windows are set in deep reveals and generally divided into four lights. The Oak Street entrance has double-glazed doors with a transom set in a segmental-arched opening with a scored fan pattern above mimicking a masonry arch construction. A long flight of granite steps with a solid railing leads to the main entrance on Santa Clara Avenue.

The structure is divided vertically into three blocks, the center block being recessed on both the front and rear elevations. On the principal Santa Clara Avenue facade, the recessed central portion has the entrance in the center of three monumental, round-headed brick arches embellished with continuous architrave molding. The arches spring from capped piers with engaged colonnettes. Behind this arcaded section an entrance porch precedes the round-arched entrance doors with fan transoms, Windows flank the entrance doors. Above the arcade is a plain cornice with the legend "City Hall" set in raised letters above the central arch. The rest of the second story has round-arched openings set in the brick-faced wall. The double-hung windows have transoms with a fan pattern divided into five sections.

The third story is also recessed in the central portion of the main and rear facades. On the main facade the central portion projects over the entrance arch and has three narrow windows. To either side are segmental arched windows set in the main plane of the wall. These, like the rest of the third-floor windows, have a central mullion and a transom section. Windows are double-hung. A plain string course is expressed in the division between the second and third stories. The third story terminates in a frieze of bricks imitating machicolation. A bracketed, moulded cornice supports the eaves.

The structure initially featured a two-story clock tower situated prominently above the central section of the main facade. This tower boasted round-arched windows, shallow balconies on the upper story, and a hipped roof adorned with a bracketed cornice. Unfortunately, the tower sustained damage during the 1906 earthquake and was subsequently dismantled in 1937. However, the base section still stands above the entrance porch.

== Significance ==
The Alameda City Hall stands as a prominent civic symbol from the city's early era of economic growth fueled by the expansion of the railroad network in the late 19th century. Erected just over two decades after the city was granted its charter in 1872, the construction encapsulated the civic aspirations of Alameda's residents. Notably, the City of Alameda achieved a pioneering status in California, being the first and the second in the United States to operate its own power plant, inaugurated in 1886. This innovation allowed the City Hall to boast the luxury of incandescent lighting, a significant advancement for its time.

Designed by George Percy of the architectural firm Percy and Hamilton, the structure reflects the prevailing trend of the Romanesque Revival Style, introduced in the United States by Henry Hobson Richardson. Richardson's influential design for the Allegheny County Courthouse (1884–1890) served as a model, and the Alameda City Hall subtly mirrors its general format. Noteworthy is the fact that Percy & Hamilton, the architectural firm behind the Alameda City Hall, contributed to approximately 200 buildings in the San Francisco Bay Area, including notable projects like the Stanford University Art Museum and the Children's Playhouse in Golden Gate Park.

== Verbal boundary description ==
Beginning at the point of intersection of the northerly line of Santa Clara Avenue with the westerly line of Oak Street, running thence along said line of Santa Clara Avenue 191 feet, thence at a right angle 207 feet north, 191 feet west to Oak Street, and 207 feet south along said line of Oak Street to point of beginning.

== See also ==
- National Register of Historic Places listings in Alameda County, California
