= Trinity Presbyterian Church (San Francisco) =

Historic church in California, United States

- U.S. National Register of Historic Places
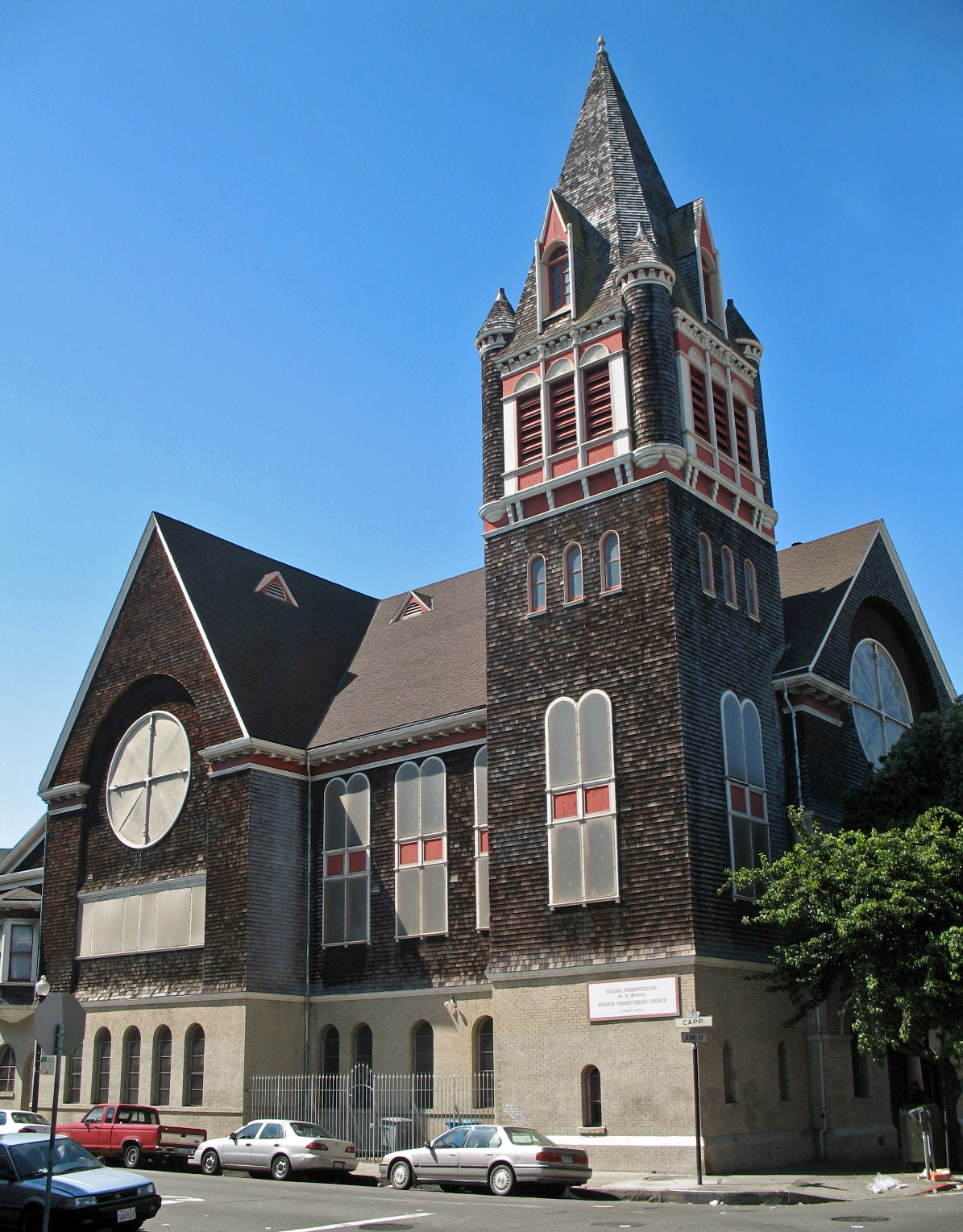

- Location within San Francisco County Location within California Location within the United States
- Location: 3261 23rd St., San Francisco, California
- Coordinates: 37°45′59″N 122°25′01″W
- Area: 0.2 acres (0.081 ha)
- Built: 1891
- Architect: Percy & Hamilton
- Architectural style: Romanesque Revival
- NRHP reference No.: 82002252
- Added to NRHP: March 2, 1982

Trinity Presbyterian Church, known from 1972 on as Mission United Presbyterian Church, is a historic Presbyterian church at 3261 23rd Street in the Mission District of San Francisco, California.

It was built in 1891 and added to the National Register of Historic Places in 1982.

It is one of relatively few works by architects Percy & Hamilton which survived the 1906 earthquake.
