= Arthur Wesley Dow =

American artist (1857–1922)

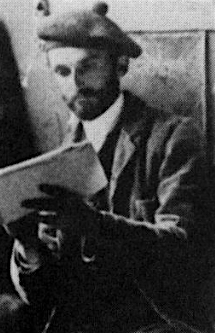
- Dow, c. 1890
- Born: April 6, 1857; Ipswich, Massachusetts, U.S.
- Died: December 13, 1922 (aged 65); New York
- Education: Académie Julian, Paris
- Spouse: Eleanor Pearson (1893–1922; death)

Arthur Wesley Dow (April 6, 1857 – December 13, 1922) was an American painter, printmaker, photographer and an arts educator.

== Early life ==
Arthur Wesley Dow was born in Ipswich, Massachusetts, in 1857. Dow received his first art training in 1880 from Anna K. Freeland of Worcester, Massachusetts. The following year, Dow continued his studies in Boston with James M. Stone, a former student of Frank Duveneck and Gustave Bouguereau. In 1884, he went to Paris for his early art education, studying at the Académie Julian, under the supervision of the academic artists Gustave Boulanger and Jules Joseph Lefebvre.

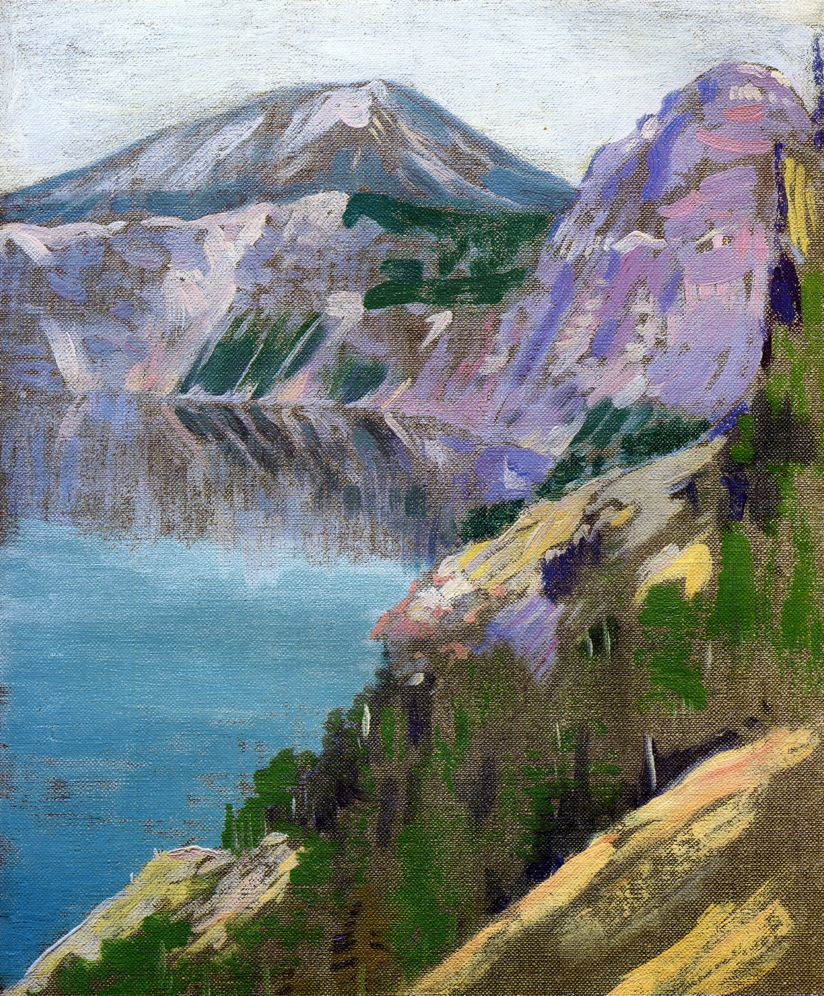
Crater Lake, oil on canvas, 1919

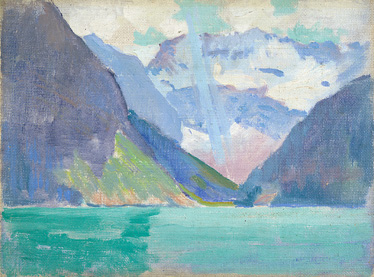
Arthur Wesley Dow: View of Lake Louise, Alberta, Canada, 1919

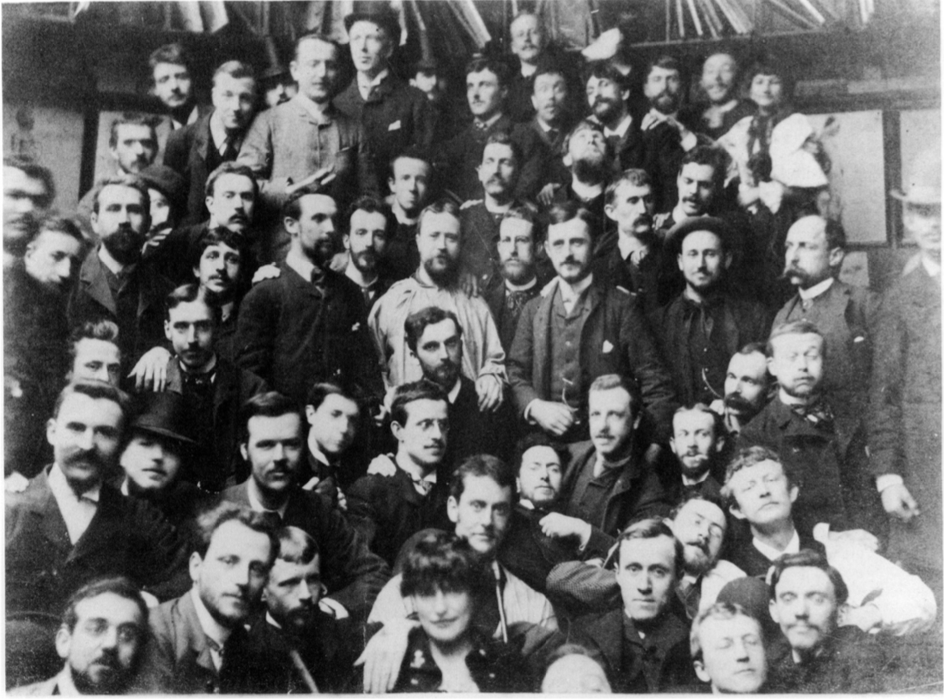
Portrait of students of Académie Julian, France, 1886. (Dow is depicted in center)

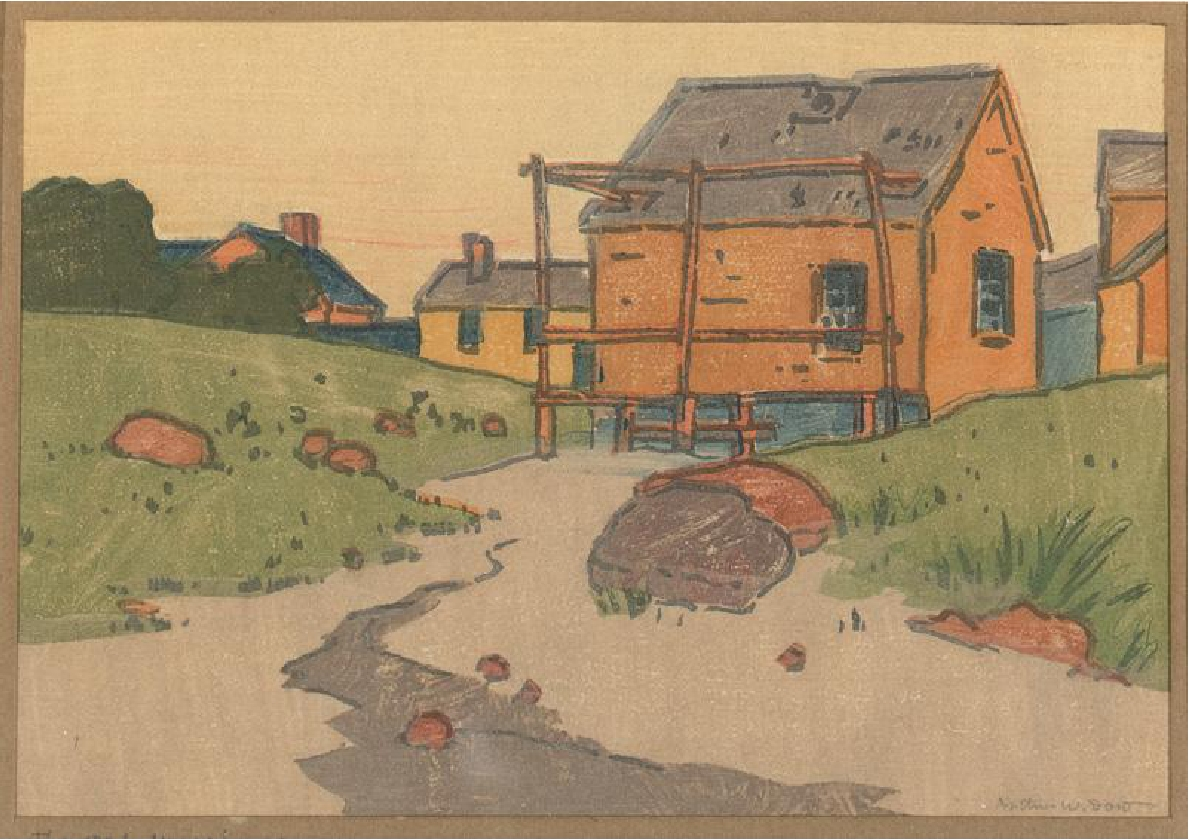
Arthur Wesley Dow, The Clam House, woodblock print, circa 1892

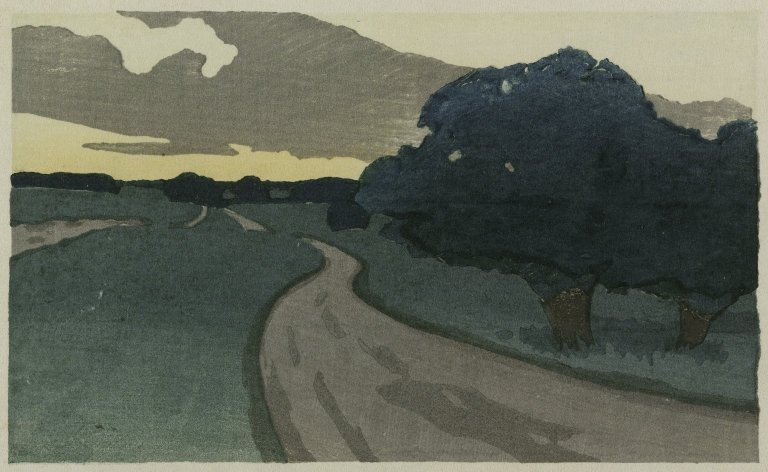
The Long Road--Argilla Road, Ipswich, 1898, Brooklyn Museum

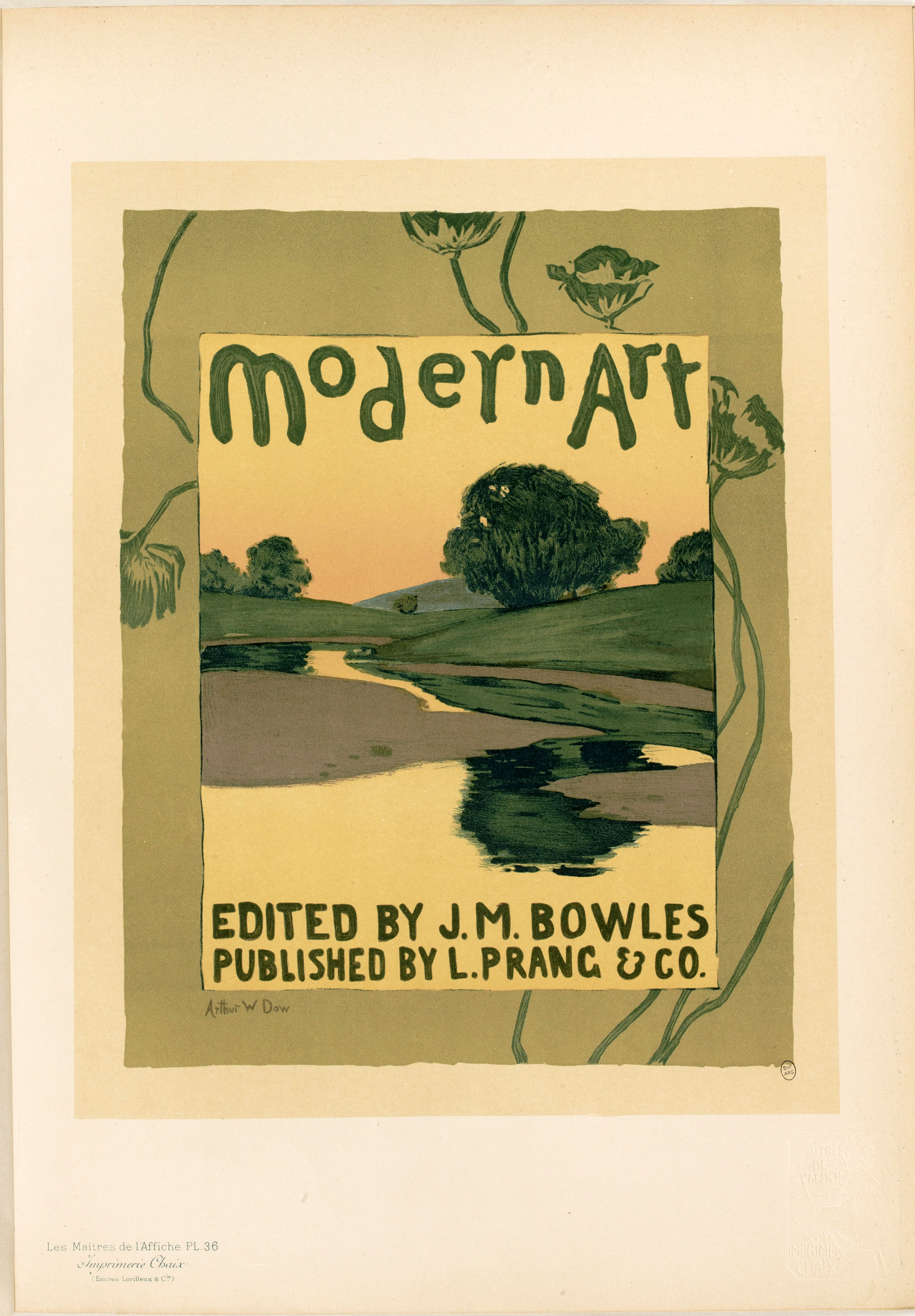
Poster published in Les Maîtres de l'Affiche

== Career ==
In 1893, Dow was appointed assistant curator of the Japanese collection at the Museum of Fine Arts, Boston under Ernest Fenellosa. Fenellosa introduced Dow to ukiyo‑e, the woodblock prints of Japan, which greatly influenced his later works.

He accepted commissions for posters and other commercial work. In 1895, he designed the poster to advertise the Journal of Modern Art and in 1896, he designed the poster for an exhibition of Japanese prints.

Over the course of his career, Dow taught art at a few major American arts training institutions, beginning with the Pratt Institute from 1896 to 1903. He also taught at the New York Art Students League, from 1898 to 1903. In 1900, Dow founded and served as the director of the Ipswich Summer School of Art in Ipswich, Massachusetts. From 1904 to 1922, he was a professor of fine arts at Columbia University Teachers College.

== Death and legacy ==
Dow died on December 13, 1922, in his home in New York City. He was interred in the Old North Burying Ground in Ipswich, Massachusetts. He was survived by his wife Eleanor Pearson, whom he married in 1893.

=== Influence on others ===
Dow taught many of America's leading artists and craftspeople, including: Georgia O'Keeffe, Shirley Williamson, Charles Sheeler, Charles J. Martin, two of the Overbeck Sisters, Delle Miller, Charles Burchfield, Isabelle Percy West and Walter King Stone. One of his pupils, the educator and printmaker Pedro Joseph de Lemos, adapted and widely disseminated Dow's theories in dozens of theoretical and instructional publications (1918–1950) for art schools. Early in his career, the young Frank Lloyd Wright was influenced by Dow.

Dow also had influence at the Byrdcliffe Colony.

== Ideas on teaching art ==
His ideas were quite revolutionary for the period; Dow taught that rather than copying nature, individuals should create art through elements of the composition, such as line, mass, and color. He wanted leaders of the public to see art is a living force for all in everyday life, not as a sort of traditional ornament for the few. Dow suggested that the American lack of interest in art would improve if art was presented as a means of self-expression. He wanted people to be able to include personal experience in creating art.

His ideas on art were published in his 1899 book Composition: A Series of Exercises in Art Structure for the Use of Students and Teachers. The following extracts are from the prefatory chapter "Beginnings" to the second edition of this book (1912):

Composition ... expresses the idea upon which the method here presented is founded - the "putting together" of lines, masses and colors to make a harmony. ... Composition, building up of harmony, is the fundamental process in all the fine arts. ... A natural method is of exercises in progressive order, first building up very simple harmonies ... Such a method of study includes all kinds of drawing, design and painting. It offers a means of training for the creative artist, the teacher or one who studies art for the sake of culture.

== Bibliography ==
- Arthur Wesley Dow (1912). Theory and Practice of Teaching Art (2nd ed.). Teachers College, Columbia University.
- Arthur Wesley Dow (January 1913). "Constructive Art-Teaching". Teachers College Bulletin. Columbia University.
- Arthur Wesley Dow (September 1918), "A Course in Fine Art", Bulletin of the College Art Association of America, vol. 1, no. 4, pp. 4 no, hdl:2027/mdp.39015017542740 – via HathiTrust
- Arthur Wesley Dow (1920). Composition: A Series of Exercises in Art Structure for the Use of Students and Teachers. Doubleday, Page & Company.

== Collections ==
The Dow Collection at the Ipswich Museum in Ipswich, Massachusetts is the largest single collection of the artist's works. Art by Dow is also represented in the following collections:

- Addison Gallery of American Art
- Amon Carter Museum of American Art
- Art Institute of Chicago
- Brooklyn Museum
- Fine Arts Museums of San Francisco
- Herbert F. Johnson Museum of Art
- Metropolitan Museum of Art
- Museum of Fine Arts, Boston
- Museum of the American Arts and Crafts Movement
- Princeton University Art Museum
- San Diego Museum of Art
- Smithsonian American Art Museum
- Terra Foundation for American Art
- Wadsworth Athenaeum
