= Thomas Starr King =

American clergyman and abolitionist

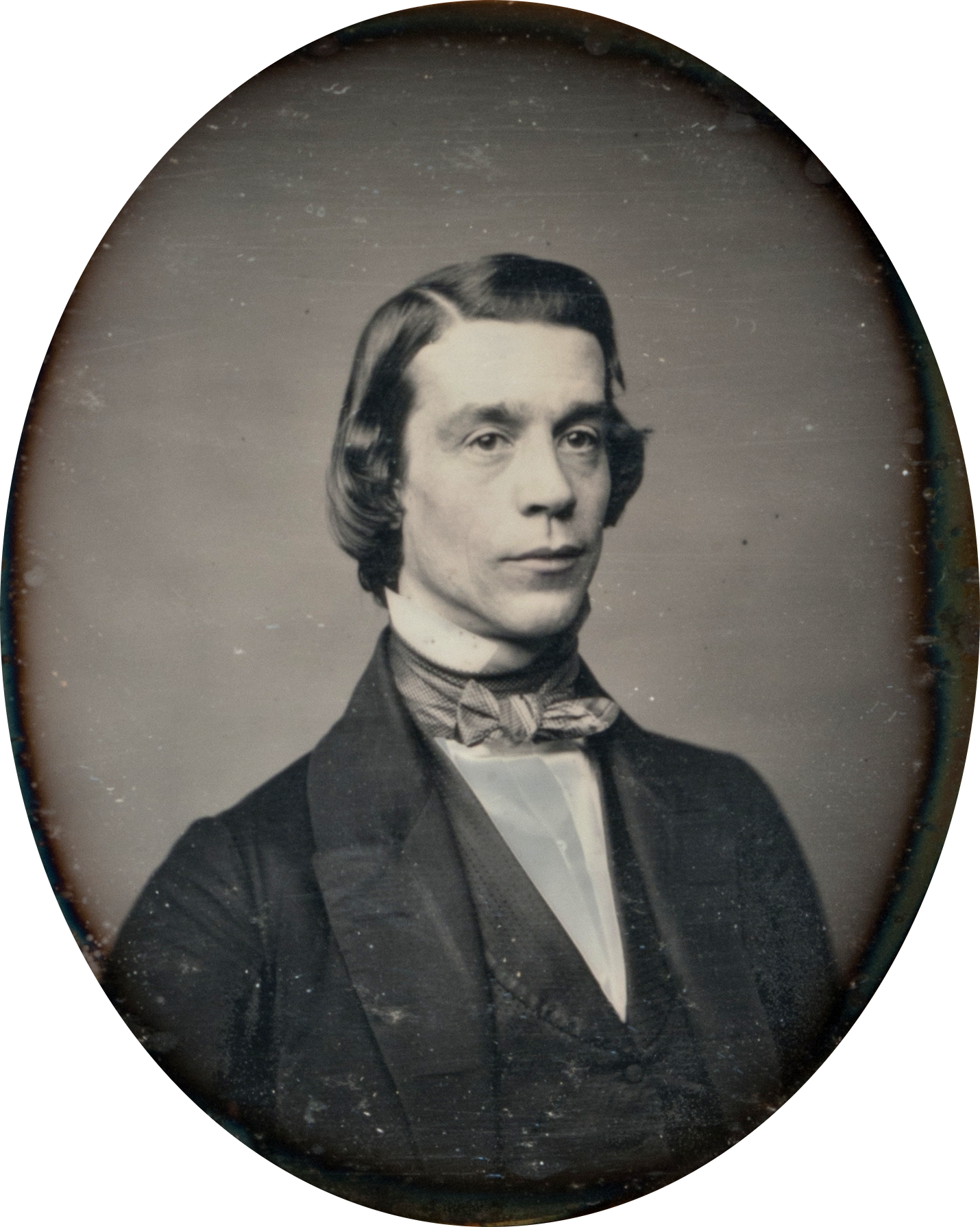
- Born: December 17, 1824; New York City, New York, U.S.
- Died: March 4, 1864 (aged 39); San Francisco, California, U.S.
- Occupations: Minister, orator

Thomas Starr King (December 17, 1824 – March 4, 1864), often known as Starr King, was an American Universalist and Unitarian minister, influential in California politics during the American Civil War, and Freemason. Starr King spoke zealously in favor of the Union and was credited by Abraham Lincoln with preventing California from becoming a separate republic. He is sometimes referred to as "the orator who saved the nation".

== Early life ==
Starr King was born on December 17, 1824, in New York City to Rev. Thomas Farrington King, a Universalist minister, and Susan Starr King. Inspired by men like Ralph Waldo Emerson and Henry Ward Beecher, King embarked on a program of self-study for the ministry. At the age of 20 he took over his father's former pulpit at the Charlestown Universalist Church in Charlestown, Massachusetts.

King married Julia Wiggin in 1848.

== Career ==
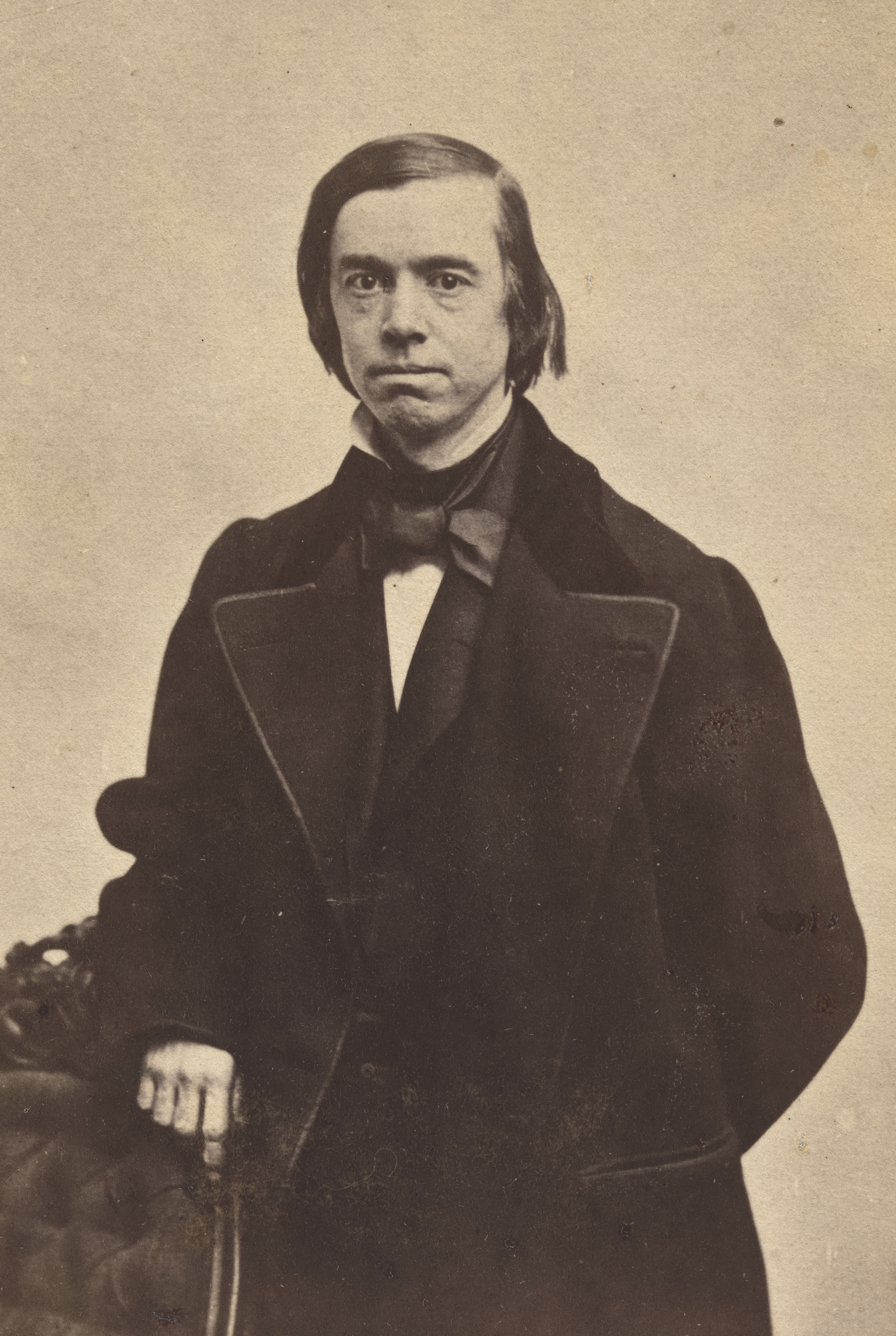
Photograph of Thomas Starr King by James Wallace Black, c. 1860

In 1849, he was appointed pastor of the Hollis Street Church in Boston, where he became one of the most famous preachers in New England and a noted speaker on the lyceum circuit through New England and as far as Chicago. He was ranked as one of the four greatest lyceum speakers, along with Wendell Phillips, Edwin Hubbell Chapin, and Henry Ward Beecher; for some reason, a celebrated fifth speaker, Ralph Waldo Emerson, was not included in this tally. His lyceum lectures for general audiences included "Substance and Show", "Sights and Insights", "The Ideal and the Real", "Existence and Life", and a number of talks on Plato and Johann Wolfgang von Goethe. As Edward Everett Hale recounts:

King said that a popular lyceum lecture was made of five parts of sense and five of nonsense. "There are only five men in America," said he, "who know how to mix them—and I think I am one of the five." Other people thought so too, and did not detect the nonsense. His carefully wrought lectures are worth anybody's study today. He is the author of another lyceum chestnut. Some one asked him what his honorarium was for each lecture. "F.A.M.E.," said he—"Fifty And My Expenses."

During those years, Starr King vacationed in the White Mountains of New Hampshire and in 1859 published a book about the area entitled The White Hills; their Legends, Landscapes, & Poetry. In 1860 he accepted a call from the First Unitarian Church of San Francisco, California. In July of that year, he visited Yosemite and was moved spiritually by its splendor. Upon returning to San Francisco, he began preaching a series of sermons on Yosemite, published letters about it in the Boston Evening Transcript, and aligned himself with fellow abolitionist and landscape architect, Frederick Law Olmsted, to have Yosemite set aside as a reserve. Yosemite would become a California State Park and eventually a national park.

Starr King joined the Freemasons and was "raised to the sublime degree of Master Mason" in Oriental Lodge No. 144 in San Francisco, now Phoenix Lodge No. 144, and served as grand orator of the Grand Lodge of California in 1863.

During the Civil War, Starr King spoke zealously in favor of the Union and was credited by Abraham Lincoln with preventing California from becoming a separate republic. He specifically campaigned against the Pacific Republic movement at a time when the state was culturally fractured by settlers from southern states with lingering Confederate loyalties.At the urging of Jessie Benton Frémont, Starr King teamed up with writer Bret Harte, and Starr King read Harte's patriotic poems at pro-Union speeches. Starr King also read original verses by Henry Wadsworth Longfellow and James Russell Lowell which captured the imagination of the Californians. In a letter by Starr King wrote to James T. Fields, the editor of the Atlantic Monthly, "The state must be Northernized thoroughly, by schools, Atlantic Monthlies, lectures, N.E. preachers." On George Washington's birthday in 1861, King spoke for two hours to over a thousand people about how they should remember Washington by preserving the Union:

"I pitched into Secession, Concession and Calhoun, right and left, and made the Southerners applaud. I pledged California to a Northern Republic and to a flag that should have no treacherous threads of cotton in its warp, and the audience came down in thunder. At the close it was announced that I would repeat it the next night, and they gave me three rounds of cheers." ... King covered his pulpit with an American flag and ended all his sermons with "God bless the president of the United States and all who serve with him the cause of a common country."

Starr King's younger brother, Edward M. King, served as captain of the clipper ship Syren. Capt. Edward King arrived in San Francisco aboard Syren just two days after his elder brother's stirring 1861 speech about Washington and the Union, remarking, "Starr has the brains of the family, and I the brawn."

In addition, Starr King organized the Pacific Branch of the United States Sanitary Commission, which raised money and medical materials for wounded soldiers and was the predecessor to the American Red Cross. A fiery orator, he raised more than $1.5 million for the Sanitary Commission headquarters in New York City, one-fifth of the total contributions from all the states in the Union.

== Death ==
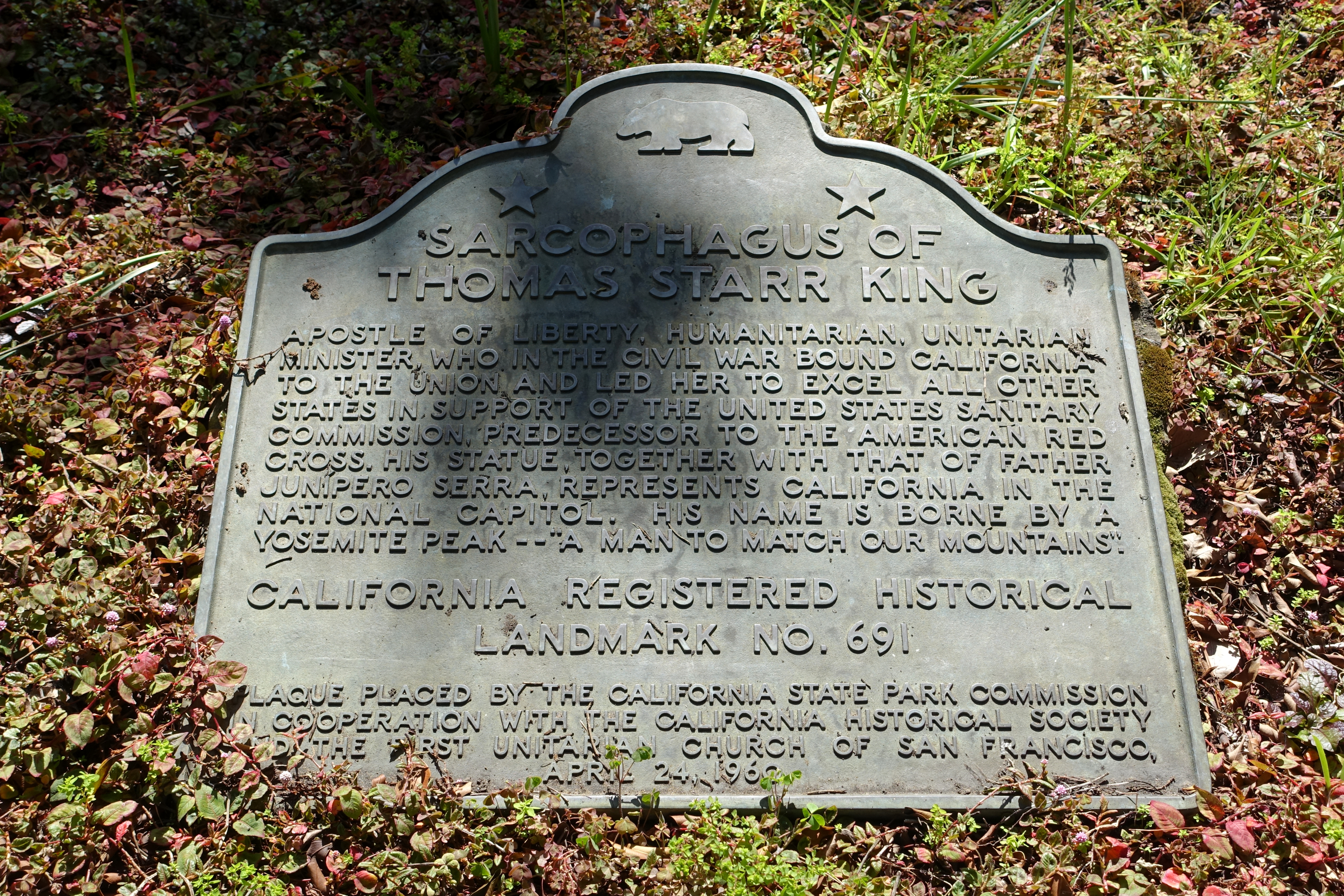
Plaque at Thomas Starr King sarcophagus

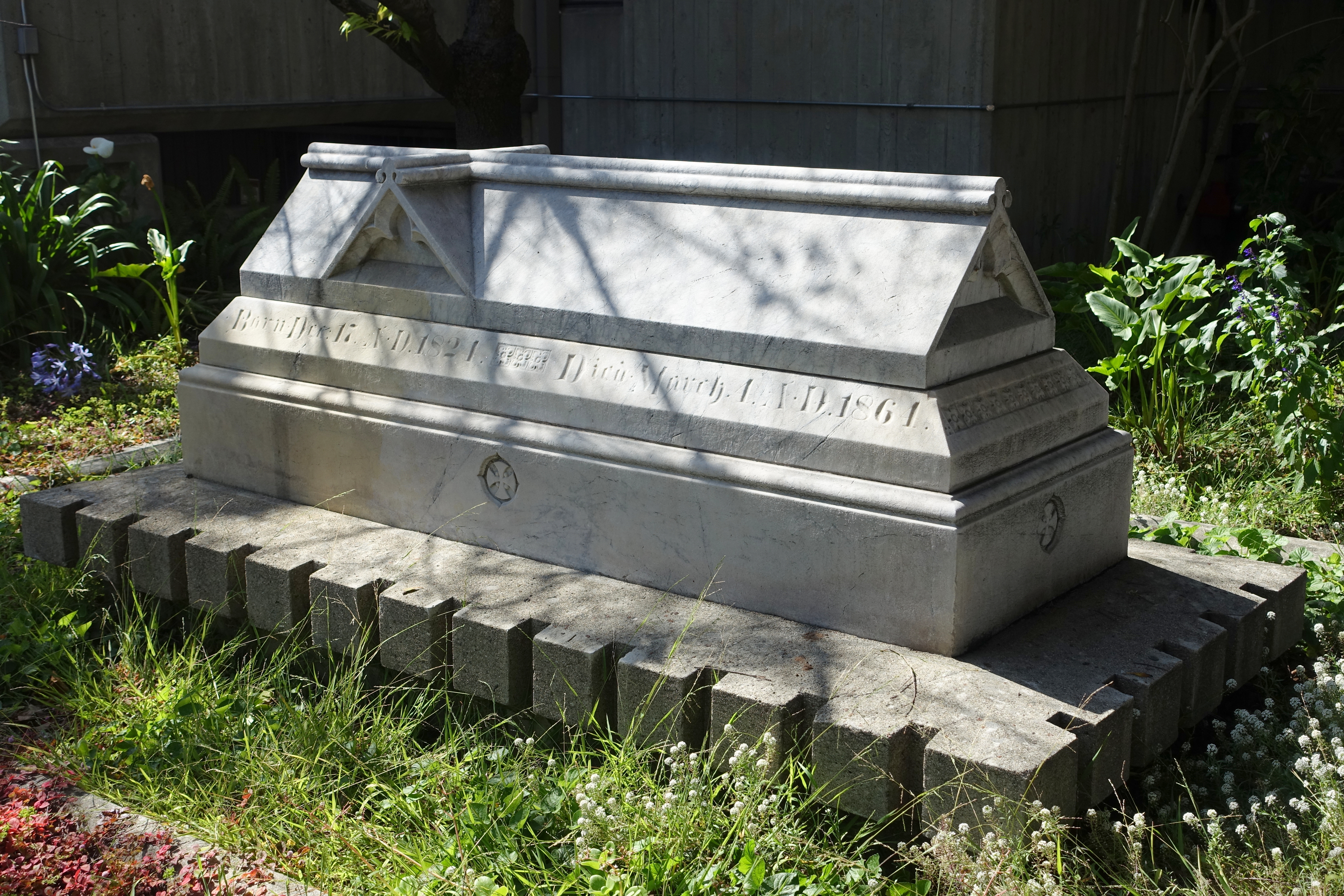
Sarcophagus of Thomas Starr King in San Francisco

The relentless lecture circuit exhausted him, and he died in San Francisco on March 4, 1864, of diphtheria and pneumonia. His dying words were said to be "Beautiful boy", referring to his young son. Over twenty thousand people attended his funeral and several of his friends including Charles Stoddard, Bret Harte and Ina Coolbrith published tributes. King was first interred on the 100 block of Geary Street and is now interred at First Unitarian Universalist Society of San Francisco at Starr King Way and Franklin Street between O'Farrell Street and Geary Street in San Francisco. In the 1940s, most of San Francisco's dead were disinterred and moved to new resting places outside city limits; the grave of Starr King was one of the very few allowed to remain undisturbed.

== Honors ==
=== Landmarks ===
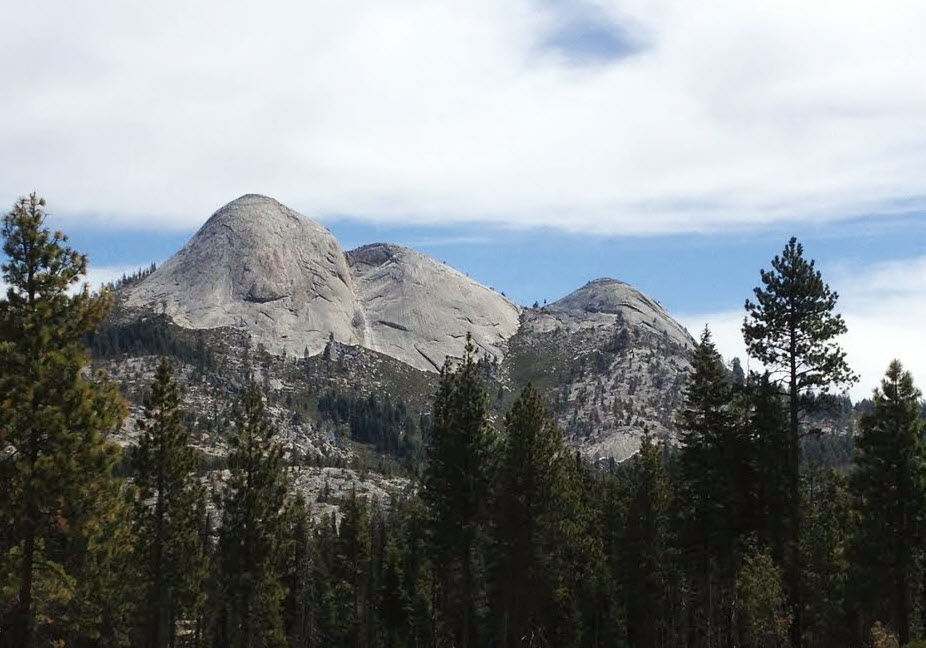
Mount Starr King in Yosemite

- Mountain peaks in the White Mountains (Mount Starr King, elevation 1,191 m (3,907 ft)) and in Yosemite National Park (Mount Starr King) are named in his honor.
- A giant sequoia in the Calaveras Grove.

=== Schools ===
- In 1941, the Pacific Unitarian School for the Ministry (Unitarian Universalist), in Berkeley, California, was renamed the Starr King School for the Ministry in his honor
- Starr King K–8 School in Carmichael, California
- Starr King Elementary School in Long Beach, California
- Thomas Starr King Middle School in the Silver Lake neighborhood of Los Angeles
- Starr King Elementary School in San Francisco
- The Starr King Parent-Child Workshop, founded in 1949 in Santa Barbara, California, is an active cooperative nursery school and parent-education resource

=== Churches ===
- Starr King Unitarian Universalist Church in Hayward, California
- Starr King Unitarian Universalist Fellowship (SKUUF) in New Hampshire

=== Streets ===
- Starr King Way in San Francisco
- Starr King Circle in Palo Alto, California
- Starr King Court Charlestown Massachusetts

=== Parks ===
- Starr King Openspace, a park in Potrero Hill, San Francisco

=== Buildings ===
- Starr King Lodge A.F. & A.M., a Masonic lodge founded in 1864 in Salem, Massachusetts

=== Ship ===
- Clipper ship Starr King

=== Statuary and monuments ===
- Thomas Starr King Statue in Golden Gate Park, facing JFK Drive, close to the De Young Museum.
- King's church, the First Unitarian Church and his sarcophagus in San Francisco are designated historical monuments.

=== Statue in California State Capitol ===
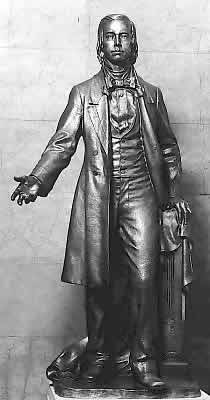
Thomas Starr King (National Statuary Hall Collection statue, now located at the California State Capitol)

As part of honors originally paid to Rev. King, he was judged worthy of representing California in the National Statuary Hall Collection displayed in the United States Capitol. In 1913, King was voted one of California's two greatest heroes and funds were appropriated for a statue. In 1931, California officially donated a bronze statue of King to be mounted in Statuary Hall.

On August 31, 2006, however, the California Legislature approved a joint resolution to replace Thomas Starr King's statue in Statuary Hall with a statue of Ronald Reagan. The resolution was authored by Republican State Senator Dennis Hollingsworth, who stated the reason for the resolution as, "To be honest with you, I wasn't sure who Thomas Starr King was, and I think there's probably a lot of Californians like me." He also went on to observe that King was not a native of the state though, of course, neither was Reagan (nor was Junípero Serra, the other statue representing California in Statuary Hall).

As a result of this resolution, King's statue was removed from Statuary Hall, and the statue of Ronald Reagan was placed in Statuary Hall on June 10, 2009. In November 2009, Starr King's statue was reinstalled within the Civil War Memorial Grove in Capitol Park, which surrounds the California State Capitol in Sacramento. It was formally dedicated in a ceremony held on December 8, 2009.

== Works ==
- A Vacation Among the Sierras: Yosemite in 1860.
- The White Hills; their Legends, Landscapes, & Poetry. Boston: Crosby, Nichols & Co., 1860.
- Patriotism and Other Papers. Boston: Tompkins, 1864.
- Christianity and Humanity. Boston: Osgood, 1877.
- Substance and Show, and Other Lectures. Boston: Houghton & Osgood, 1877.
