= William Cliffton =

American poet

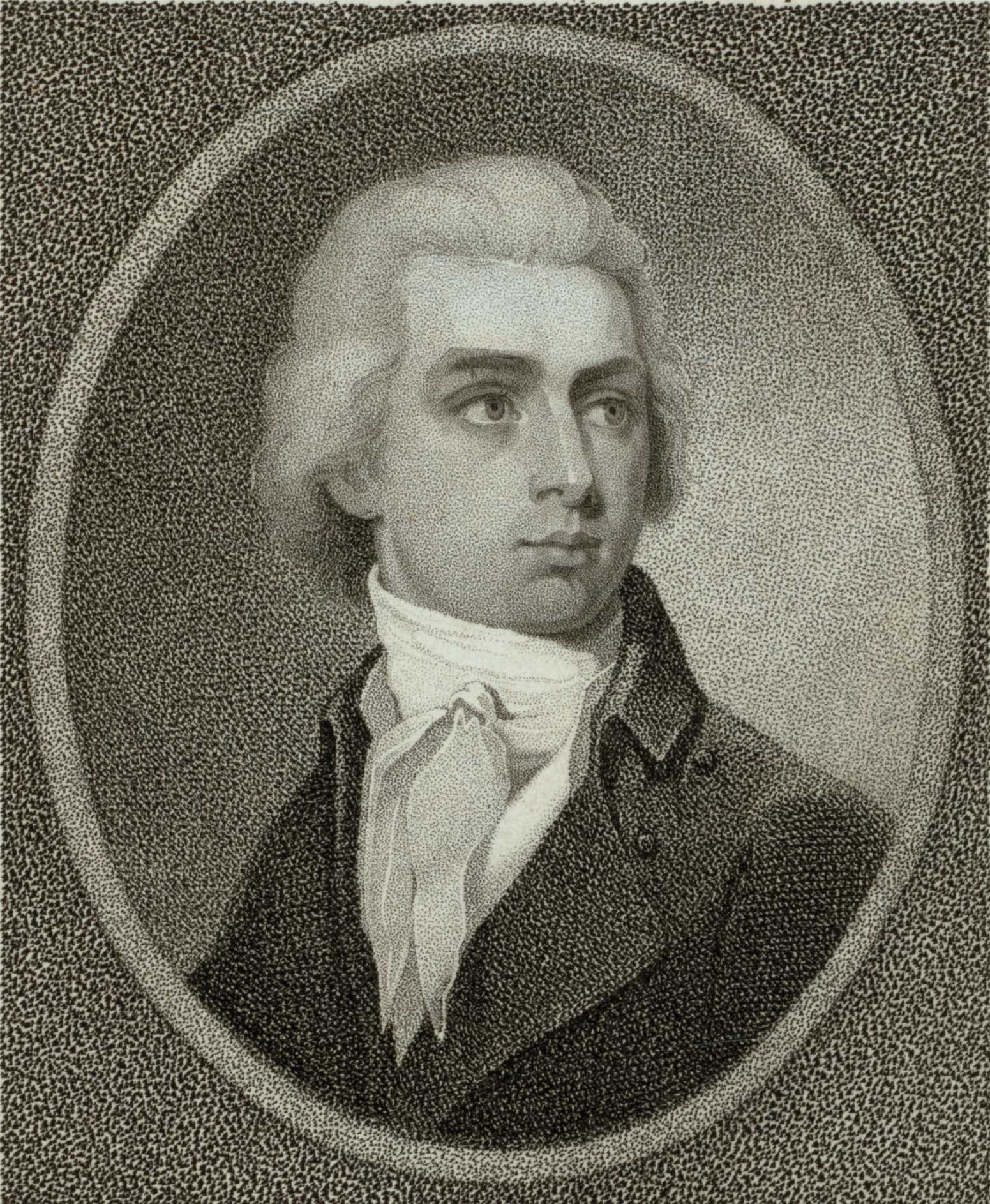
- Born: 1772
- Died: December 1799 (aged 26–27)
- Occupation: Poet

William Cliffton (1771 – December 1799) was a Philadelphian poet and pamphleteer. He is the only identified member of the Anchor Club. He is considered part of the "transitive state" of American poetry.

Born the son of a wealthy Quaker, Cliffton suffered form a blood clot at the age of nineteen, and from then until his death, aged twenty-seven, pursued an almost exclusively literary life, though he took an interest in field sports.

Cliffton was a supporter of William Cobbett. He died in December 1799 from consumption.

== Works ==
- A Poetical Rhapsody of the Times.. (as Dick Retort) (1796)
- A Flight of Fancy (1800)
