= Percy & Hamilton =

American architect

Percy & Hamilton was an architectural firm in San Francisco, California during 1880 to 1899.

The firm was a partnership of George Washington Percy (1847–1900) and Frederick Foss Hamilton (1851–1899). During the period of 1890 to 1900, they designed numerous residences and churches in the Pacific Heights area. Many of their works were destroyed in the 1906 earthquake; others were destroyed for redevelopment. Several of their works survive and are listed on the National Register of Historic Places.

== Architectural works ==
Select list of architectural works, in order by date.

- Charles Heise House (1884), at 2517 Pacific Avenue, San Francisco, California
- Greystone Cellars (1886), 2555 Main Street, St. Helena, California, NRHP-listed
- Sharon Children's House and Play Ground, in Golden Gate Park, San Francisco, California

- Sharon Children's House (1887) now houses the Sharon Art Studio
- Sharon Children's Play Ground (1888) is now known as the Koret Children's Playground

- First Unitarian Church (1889), at 1187 Franklin Street, San Francisco, California; San Francisco Landmark #40
- Frederick Hamilton House (1890), at 2513 Pacific Avenue, San Francisco, California
- J. C. Stubbs House (1892), at 2519 Pacific Avenue, San Francisco, California
- Trinity Presbyterian Church (1892), 3261–23rd Street, San Francisco, California; NRHP-listed
- Cantor Arts Center (1894) at Stanford University, Stanford, California
- Alameda City Hall (1896), Santa Clara Avenue and Oak Street, Alameda, California; NRHP-listed
- Alvinza Hayward Building (1906), 400 Montgomery Street, San Francisco, California; San Francisco Landmark #161; after Hamilton's death, Percy worked briefly with Willis Polk; this partnership designed the Alvinza Hayward Building, located in the financial district.

== See also ==
- List of San Francisco Designated Landmarks
