= Harriet Randall Lumis =

American painter (1870–1953)

Harriet Randall Lumis (1870 – April 6, 1953) was a landscape painter based in Springfield, Massachusetts.

== Early life and education ==
Harriet Randall was born in Salem, Connecticut.

She began art studies after she married, in Springfield, Massachusetts in 1893. She first painted landscapes and studied at the New York Summer School in Cos Cob, Connecticut. Beginning in 1920, Lumis studied under Hugh Breckenridge at the Breckenridge School of Art in East Gloucester, Massachusetts.

== Career ==
Harriet Randall Lumis helped to found the Springfield Art League. In 1921, she was elected as a member of the National Association of Women Painters and Sculptors. She was one of the founders of the Academic Artists Association, which promoted realistic and traditional art (and opposed modernist art movements). In widowhood she taught art.

== Personal life, death and legacy ==
Harriet Randall married architectural engineer Fred Williams Lumis in 1892. She was widowed in 1937. Harriet Randall Lumis died in Springfield, Massachusetts on April 6, 1953. In 1977-1978 there was a show of Lumis's art at a gallery in Chicago, and at the Rahr West Art Museum in Manitowoc, Wisconsin. Her paintings are in the collections of Springfield's Museum of Fine Arts, the Bush–Holley House, the Mattatuck Museum, the Butler Institute of American Art, and the Asheville Art Museum, among others.
