= Modern Chivalry =

Modern Chivalry first edition

Modern Chivalry: Containing the Adventures of Captain John Farrago and Teague O'Regan, His Servant is a rambling, satirical American novel by Hugh Henry Brackenridge, a Pittsburgh writer, lawyer, judge, and justice of the Pennsylvania Supreme Court. The book was first published in 1792.

The hero, Captain John Farrago, is a frontier Don Quixote-like figure who leaves his Western Pennsylvania farm on a whim, to "ride about the world a little, with his man Teague at his heels, to see how things were going on here and there, and to observe human nature".

Modern Chivalry first appeared in 1792 in two parts, and the third and fourth sections of the book appeared in 1793 and 1797, and a revision in 1805, with a final addition in 1815.

The book is arguably the first important work of fiction about the American frontier. Henry Adams referred to Modern Chivalry as "a more thoroughly American book than any written before 1833." An article in the Literary Examiner, and Western Monthly Review noted the book's place in history was "to the West what Don Quixote was to Europe" and called it a "humorous text of all classes of society". John Quincy Adams in 1847 predicted that the novel would "last beyond the period fixed by the ancient statutes for the canonization of poets, a full century.
