= The Rising Glory of America =

Early American nationalistic poem

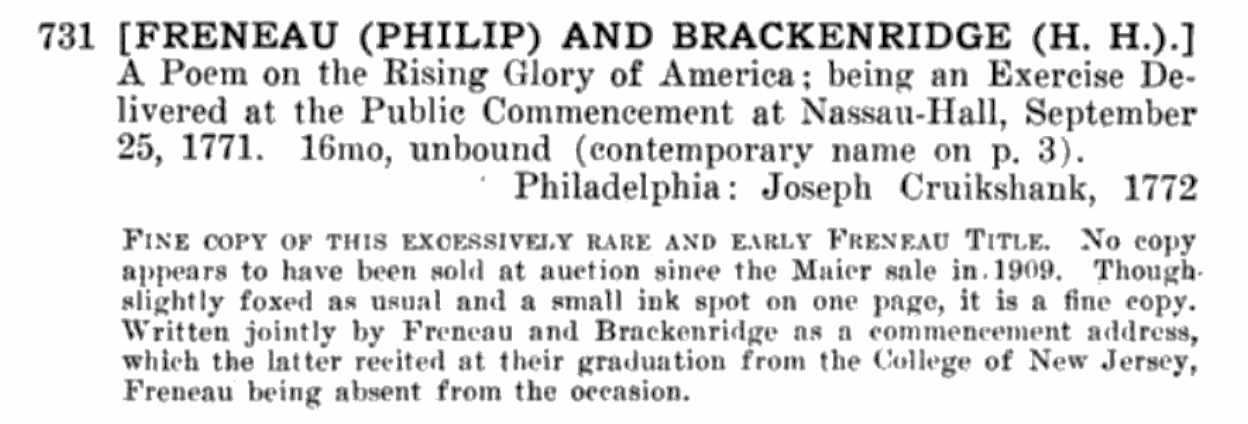
- 1923 Americana auction catalog listing
- Original title: A Poem, on the Rising Glory of America; Being an Exercise Delivered at the Public Commencement at Nassau-Hall, September 25, 1771
- Country: United States
- Publisher: Printed by Joseph Crukshank, for R. Aitken, bookseller, opposite the London-Coffee-House, in Front-Street, Philadelphia
- Publication date: 1772

"The Rising Glory of America" is a poem written by "Poet of the Revolution" Philip Freneau, with a debated but likely minimal level of involvement from "not quite a Founding Father" Hugh Henry Brackenridge of western Pennsylvania. The poem was first read at their graduation from the College of New Jersey (later Princeton University) in 1771. (Note: Freneau, Brackenridge, and James Madison were all in the same graduating class.) There were two versions published, one before and one after the American Revolutionary War. It was mildly influential in describing a newfound sense of American national identity.

== See also ==
- Father Bombo's Pilgrimage to Mecca, novel co-authored by Freneau and Brackenridge
- 1772 in poetry
