= Hugh Henry Brackenridge =

American judge

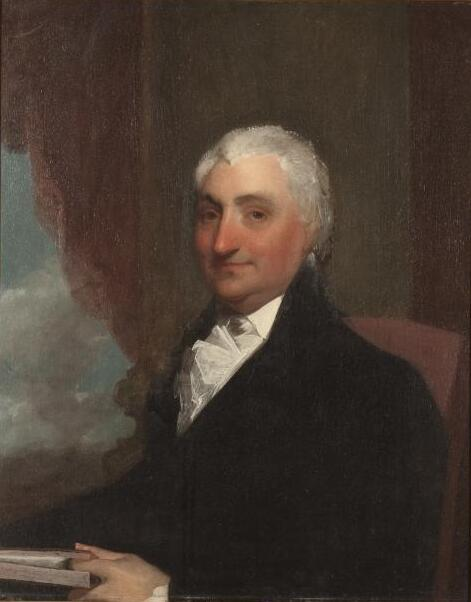
- portrait by Gilbert Stuart
- Born: 1748; Campbeltown
- Died: June 25, 1816; Carlisle
- Occupation: Writer

Hugh Henry Brackenridge (1748 – June 25, 1816) was an American writer, lawyer, judge, and justice of the Supreme Court of Pennsylvania.

A frontier citizen in Pittsburgh, Pennsylvania, United States, he founded both the Pittsburgh Academy, now the University of Pittsburgh, and the Pittsburgh Gazette, still operating today as the Pittsburgh Post-Gazette.

== Life ==
Brackenridge was born in Campbeltown a small town on the Kintyre peninsula in Scotland. In 1753, when he was 5, his family emigrated to York County, Pennsylvania, near the Maryland border, then a frontier. At age 15 he was head of a free school in Maryland. At age 19 he entered the College of New Jersey, now Princeton University, where he joined Philip Morin Freneau, James Madison, and others in forming the American Whig Society to counter the conservative Cliosophic, or Tory, Society. (Today these are conjoined as the American Whig–Cliosophic Society.) Freneau and Brackenridge collaborated on a satire on American manners that may be the first work of prose fiction written in America, Father Bombo's Pilgrimage to Mecca . They also wrote The Rising Glory of America, a prophetic poem of a united nation that would rule the North American continent from the Atlantic Ocean to the Pacific Ocean. Brackenridge recited it at the commencement exercises of 1771.

After his graduation, Brackenridge remained another year to study divinity. In 1772 he became headmaster of Somerset Academy in Somerset County, Maryland, with Freneau as his assistant. He went back to Princeton for a master's degree, and then served in George Washington's army as a chaplain, preaching fiery patriotic sermons to the soldiers of the American Revolutionary War. He started the United States Magazine in Philadelphia in 1778, where he published poems by his friend Freneau, but its lagging subscriptions convinced him to change his profession. He took a law degree, studying under Samuel Chase in Annapolis, Maryland, and was admitted to the bar in Philadelphia in 1780 at age 32. Of Philadelphia he wrote, "I saw no chance for being anything in that city, there were such great men before me". Four months later he struck out for the frontier, 300 miles to the west, over the Appalachian Mountains.

In 1781 Pittsburgh was a village of 400 inhabitants, most Scots, like himself, Scots-Irish, and Germans. His aim, he wrote, in "offering myself to the place" was "to advance the country and thereby myself".

In Pittsburgh he helped establish the first western newspaper, the Pittsburgh Gazette, in 1786. He was elected in 1786 to the Pennsylvania state assembly, where he fought for the adoption of the federal Constitution, and obtained state endowments in 1787 for the establishment of the Pittsburgh Academy (University of Pittsburgh), modeled on Benjamin Franklin's Academy of Philadelphia (University of Pennsylvania). He also played a role in the little-known Westsylvania dispute, siding with Pennsylvania that the western lands should not become a 14th state.

He lost a bid for re-election because he opposed popular sentiment in supporting federal controls. At a dinner hosted by Chief Justice Thomas McKean, Brackenridge stated that "the people are fools; if they would let Mr. Morris alone, he would make Pennsylvania a great people, but they will not suffer him to do it". Another legislator at the party, William Findley, published an account of the remarks, and the subsequent controversy led to Brackenridge's electoral defeat. Brackenridge also nearly lost his life when he attempted to mediate the Whiskey Rebellion.

He ran for the United States Congress in 1794, but finished 4th of 5 candidates with Albert Gallatin winning. The formation of Allegheny County is largely due to Brackenridge's efforts. In December 1799 Governor Thomas McKean appointed him a justice of the Pennsylvania Supreme Court, on which he served until his death.

He corresponded with other politically active men such as Alexander Addison, a major figure in the Whiskey Rebellion. In 1815 he completed Modern Chivalry, his rambling satirical novel. Widely considered the first important fictional work about the American frontier and called "to the West what Don Quixote was to Europe", the third and fourth sections of the book appeared in 1793 and 1797, and a revision in 1805, with a final addition in 1815. Henry Adams called it "a more thoroughly American book than any written before 1833"

Brackenridge died June 25, 1816, in Carlisle, Pennsylvania, where he is buried in the Old Graveyard along with John Bannister Gibson, who succeeded him on the state supreme court.

The Allegheny County borough of Brackenridge, Pennsylvania, is named for his son, the lawyer, judge, and writer Henry Marie Brackenridge (1786–1871).

== Works ==
- 1776. The Battle of Bunker Hill. A blank-verse tragedy for performance by his students at the Somerset Academy in Maryland, where he was a master. It features contrasting views by Revolutionary leaders and the British.
- 1777. The Death of General Montgomery at the Siege of Quebec. A second patriotic drama for production at Maryland's Somerset Academy, where he was a master, is about the ill-fated attack on Quebec.
- 1783. Brackenridge, H. H., ed. Indian Atrocities: Narratives of the Perils and Sufferings of Dr. Knight and John Slover, among the Indians during the Revolutionary War, with Short Memoirs of Col. Crawford & John Slover. Cincinnati, 1867. Knight and Slover's captivity narratives, often printed under various titles and in other collections, including A Selection of the Most Interesting Narratives of Outrages Committed by the Indians… (ed. Archibald Loudon, 1808).
- 1792. Modern Chivalry. The first two parts of Brackenridge's satirical novel appear.
- 1795. Incidents of the Insurrection in the Western Parts of Pennsylvania. Covers the conflict between the federal government and the local insurgents during the Whiskey Rebellion.
- 1814 Law Miscellanies. Essays concerning Pennsylvania law, federal statutes, judgments of the U.S. Supreme Court, and the employment of English common law in the American legal system.
- 1815. Modern Chivalry. Additions completed to his four-volume novel.
