= Ilah Marian Kibbey =

American genre and landscape painter (1883–1957)

- Born: February 23, 1883; Geneva, Ohio, U.S.
- Died: August 10, 1957 (aged 74); Kansas City, Missouri, U.S.
- Education: Fine Arts Institute of Kansas City; Art Institute of Chicago; New York School of Fine and Applied Art

Ilah Marian Kibbey (1883–1957) was an American genre and landscape painter. Her series Airplane Impressions consisted of paintings of views from various flights she took over the Midwest.

== Life ==
Ilah Marian Kibbey was born in Geneva, Ohio. She attended the New York School of Fine and Applied Art, the Fine Arts Institute of Kansas City (now known as Kansas City Art Institute), and the Art Institute of Chicago. Alongside her art career, she worked as a teacher for the Kansas City Public Schools and as a registrar at the Kansas City Art Institute.

Kibbey's works are housed in the collections of the Smithsonian American Art Museum, the Library of Congress, the Nelson-Atkins Museum of Art and the Kansas City Museum.

Kibbey died on August 10, 1958, in Kansas City, MO.

== Organizational Membership ==
- Society of Independent Artists
- the Prairie Water Color Club
- the Kansas City Society of Artists
- National Association of Women Painters and Sculptors
