= List of Drew University people =

The following is a list of notable people associated with Drew University:

== Alumni ==
This is a list of notable alumni of Drew University, listing the school of Drew University that they attended, the highest degree obtained, the year of graduation or last year of attendance, and a brief description of the person. The following abbreviations are used for schools and degrees.

CLA = College of Liberal Arts
Grad = Graduate School
Theo = Theological School/Seminary
BA = Bachelor of Arts
BD = Bachelor of Divinity
DMin = Doctor of Ministry
DLitt = Doctor of Letters
MA = Master of Arts
MDiv = Master of Divinity
MFA = Master of Fine Arts
MLitt = Master of Letters
PhD = Doctor of Philosophy
ThD = Doctor of Theology

Name	School	Degree	Year	Description
William F. Anderson	Theo	BD	1887	Methodist bishop
Henry Appenzeller	Theo	BD	1885	Missionary who helped introduce Christianity in Korea
Thomas J. Aquilino	CLA	BA	1962	Federal judge on the United States Court of International Trade
Raymond LeRoy Archer	Theo	MA	1923	Methodist bishop
David B. Audretsch	CLA	BA	1976	German and American economist
Albert Baez	CLA	BA	1933	Mexican-American physicist, and father of singers Joan Baez and Mimi Fariña
Holly Bakke	CLA	BA	1973	New Jersey Commissioner of Banking and Insurance
Clint Bolick	CLA	BA	1979	Founder of the Institute for Justice
Calvin O. Butts	Theo	DMin	1982	Pastor of Abyssinian Baptist Church and president of State University of New York at Old Westbury
Charles I. Carpenter	Theo	BD	1931	First Chief of Chaplains of the U.S. Air Force
Kathy Chan	CLA	BA		Silicon Valley entrepreneur and investor
James E. Cheek	Grad	PhD	1962	Theology professor and president of Howard University
Emerson Stephen Colaw	Theo	BD	1947	Methodist bishop
Deedee Corradini	CLA	BA	1965	Mayor of Salt Lake City; president of the US Conference of Mayors, the International Women's Forum, and Women's Ski Jumping USA.
Fred Pierce Corson	Theo	BD	1920	Methodist bishop and president of Dickinson College
John T. Cunningham	CLA	BA	1938	Journalist and historian
Peter Deunov	Theo	BD	1892	Bulgarian spiritual leader and founder of the Universal White Brotherhood
Damon DiMarco	CLA	BA	1993	Author and oral historian
Joseph DiSarro	Grad	MA	1972	Political analyst and professor at Washington & Jefferson College
Ernest T. Dixon	Theo	BD	1945	Methodist bishop and president of Philander Smith College
Ed Ferrara	CLA	BA	1989	Television writer, actor, and professional wrestling personality
James Fiorentino	CLA	BA	1999	Sports artist
Maria Mazziotti Gillan	Grad	No degree	1980	American poet
Marshall Gilmore	Theo	MDiv	1960	Methodist bishop
William H. Gray	Theo	MDiv	1966	Congressman from Pennsylvania, and president of the United Negro College Fund
Robert E. Hayes	Theo	DMin	1997	Methodist bishop
Leroy Charles Hodapp	Theo	BD	1947	Methodist bishop
Dennis Hollinger	Grad	PhD	1981	President of Gordon-Conwell Theological Seminary
Fred Garrigus Holloway	Theo	BD	1921	Methodist bishop and president of Drew University
Karen Hunter	CLA	BA	1987	Journalist and publisher
Hae Jong Kim	Theo	DMin	1984	Methodist bishop
John Lowden Knight	CLA	BA	1939	President of Nebraska Wesleyan University, Baldwin-Wallace College, and Wesley Theological Seminary
Peter Leone	CLA	BA	1984	United States Equestrian Team member, and 1996 Olympic silver medalist
John Wesley Lord	Theo	BD	1930	Methodist bishop
Roger H. Martin	CLA	BA	1965	History professor and president of Randolph-Macon College
J.B. Matthews	Theo	BD	1923	Educator, political activist, and anti-Communism expert
Malcolm Maxwell	Grad	PhD	1968	President of Pacific Union College
Jackie McCullough	Theo	DMin	–	President of Beth Rapha Christian College and Theological Seminary
Kevin Murphy	CLA	BA	1989	Television writer and producer
John Gardner Murray	Theo	No degree	1881	Episcopal bishop
Floyd W. Nease	Theo	No degree	1930	Minister and the president of Eastern Nazarene College
Debra L. Ness	CLA	BA	1977	Health and public policy advocate
Dale Peck	CLA	BA	1989	Author and literary critic
Harold L. Peterson	CLA	BA	1945	Historian of arms and armor, curator of National Park Service
Soon-Yi Previn	CLA	BA	1995	Daughter of composer André Previn and wife of director Woody Allen
Robert M. Price	Grad	PhD	1981/1993	Jesus myth theologian, author, and editor-in-chief of the Journal of Higher Criticism
Sarah Price (aka S.Nice)	CLA	BA	1990	Author and inspirational speaker
Aileen Quinn	CLA	BA	1994	Actress who played Annie in the 1982 motion picture
Nathaniel Raymond	CLA	BA	1999	Human rights investigator and anti-torture advocate
John Edward Robinson	Theo	BD	1874	Methodist bishop
Kat Rosenfield	CLA	BA	2003	culture writer, columnist, and novelist
Noah Rothman	CLA	BA	2004	writer, author, editor, former MSNBC commentator, senior writer for National Review
Teresa Ruiz	CLA	BA	1998	New Jersey state legislator
David Seamands	Theo	BD	1945	Methodist pastor and self-help author
George Selgin	CLA	BA	1979	Libertarian economist
James Simester	Theo	BD	1896	Methodist missionary and president of S.L. Baldwin School of Theology
Jeff Smith	Theo	MDiv	1965	Minister, cookbook author, host of The Frugal Gourmet
Craig Stanford	CLA	BA	1978	Professor and director of the Jane Goodall Research Center at the University of Southern California
Stephen Stetler	Theo	MDiv	1974	Member of the Pennsylvania General Assembly, and Secretary of the Pennsylvania Department of Revenue
Manuel Sykes	Theo	MDiv		President of the St. Petersburg chapter of the NAACP
Bertrand M. Tipple	Theo	BD	1897	Founder and president of Methodist International College
Arturo Valenzuela	CLA	BA	1971	United States Assistant Secretary of State
James Van Der Beek	CLA	No degree	1995	Actor (star of Dawson's Creek)
Peter Verniero	CLA	BA	1981	New Jersey Attorney General and New Jersey Supreme Court justice
Herbert George Welch	Theo	BD	1890	Methodist bishop and president of Ohio Wesleyan University
Olive Winchester	Theo	ThD	1925	Nazarene theologian and first female ordained minister in Great Britain
Wendy Mass	Grad	DLitt	2013	American novelist
Stefan Passantino				lawyer

== Faculty and staff ==
This is a list of notable faculty and staff members, the years that they were employed by Drew University, and a brief description of the person.

Name	First Year	Last Year	Description
William Campbell	1990	Present	Awarded Nobel prize in Physiology or Medicine in 2015
Bernhard Anderson	1954	1963	Old Testament theologian and dean of the Drew University Theological School
Robert L. Chapman	1966	1986	Lexicographer, editor of Roget's Thesaurus, and English professor
Robert S. Corrington	1991	Present	Founder of the philosophy of estatic naturalism, and professor of philosophical theology
Will Herberg	1955	1976	Jewish theologian, conservative columnist, and professor of philosophy and culture
Ada Maria Isasi-Diaz	1991	2012	Founder of mujerista theology, and professor of ethics and theology
Catherine Keller	1986	Present	Process theologian, theopoetic scholar, and professor of constructive theology
Anne Marie Macari	2007	Present	Poet and founder of Drew University's Master of Fine Arts (MFA) in poetry program
John Miley	1873	1895	Scholar of Christian atonement, and professor of systematic theology
Dika Newlin	1952	1965	Musicologist, child music prodigy, and founder of the music department
Thomas C. Oden	1980	2004	Founder of paleo-orthodoxy religious movement, and professor of ethics and theology
Ira Progoff	1959	1971	Psychotherapist, developer of the Intensive Journal Method, and researcher of depth psychology
Richard Stonesifer	1965	1971	Dean of the DU College of Liberal Arts, president of Monmouth University, and Woodrow Wilson professor of humanities and social science
James Strong	1868	1893	Author of Strong's Concordance and professor of exegetical theology
Leonard Sweet	1995	Present	A leader of emerging church movement, professor of evangelism, and vice-president of Drew University
Andrea Talentino	2009	2011	Ninth president of Augustana College

== University presidents ==
The following is a list of the presidents of Drew University from its founding in 1867 to the present, including the years that they served as president, and a brief description of the person.

#	Name	First Year	Last Year	Description
1	John McClintock	1867	1870	Professor of practical theology, editor of Methodist Quarterly Review, and co-founder of the Theological Seminary
2	Randolph Sinks Foster	1870	1873	Professor of systematic theology, and after Drew presidency became a Methodist bishop in Cincinnati, Ohio
3	John Fletcher Hurst	1873	1880	Professor of historic theology, and after Drew presidency became a Methodist bishop in Des Moines, Iowa
4	Henry Anson Buttz	1880	1912	Professor of Greek and New Testament exegesis for 50 years, and led Drew through a major expansion.
5	Ezra Squier Tipple	1912	1929	Professor of practical theology, admitted women to Drew on a limited basis, and oversaw founding of the CLA
6	Arlo Ayres Brown	1929	1948	Led Drew through World War II, and oversaw major changes in degree programs, student body, and campus design
7	Fred Garrigus Holloway	1948	1960	Oversaw the founding of the Graduate School, and after Drew presidency became a Methodist bishop in West Virginia
8	Robert Fisher Oxnam	1961	1974	Led Drew through a major expansion of the student body and the turbulent social changes of the 1960s
9	Paul Hardin	1975	1988	Oversaw the founding of the Methodist Archives Center, the RISE program and Drew's computer initiative
10	Thomas H. Kean	1990	2005	Former Governor of New Jersey who oversaw a major expansion of the Drew's endowment, and chaired the 9/11 Commission
11	Robert Weisbuch	2005	2012	Former president of the Woodrow Wilson National Fellowship Foundation who made admission to Drew SAT-optional
12	Vivian Bull	2012	2014	Former president of Linfield College in Oregon, economics professor and dean at Drew for 32 years, oversaw financial restructuring of Drew University.
13	MaryAnn Baenninger	2014	2020	Former president of the College of St. Benedict in Minnesota, and psychology professor, was first full-term female president of Drew University.
14	Thomas Schwarz	2020	2023	
15	Hilary L. Link	2023	present	
