= Silva Tipple New Lake =

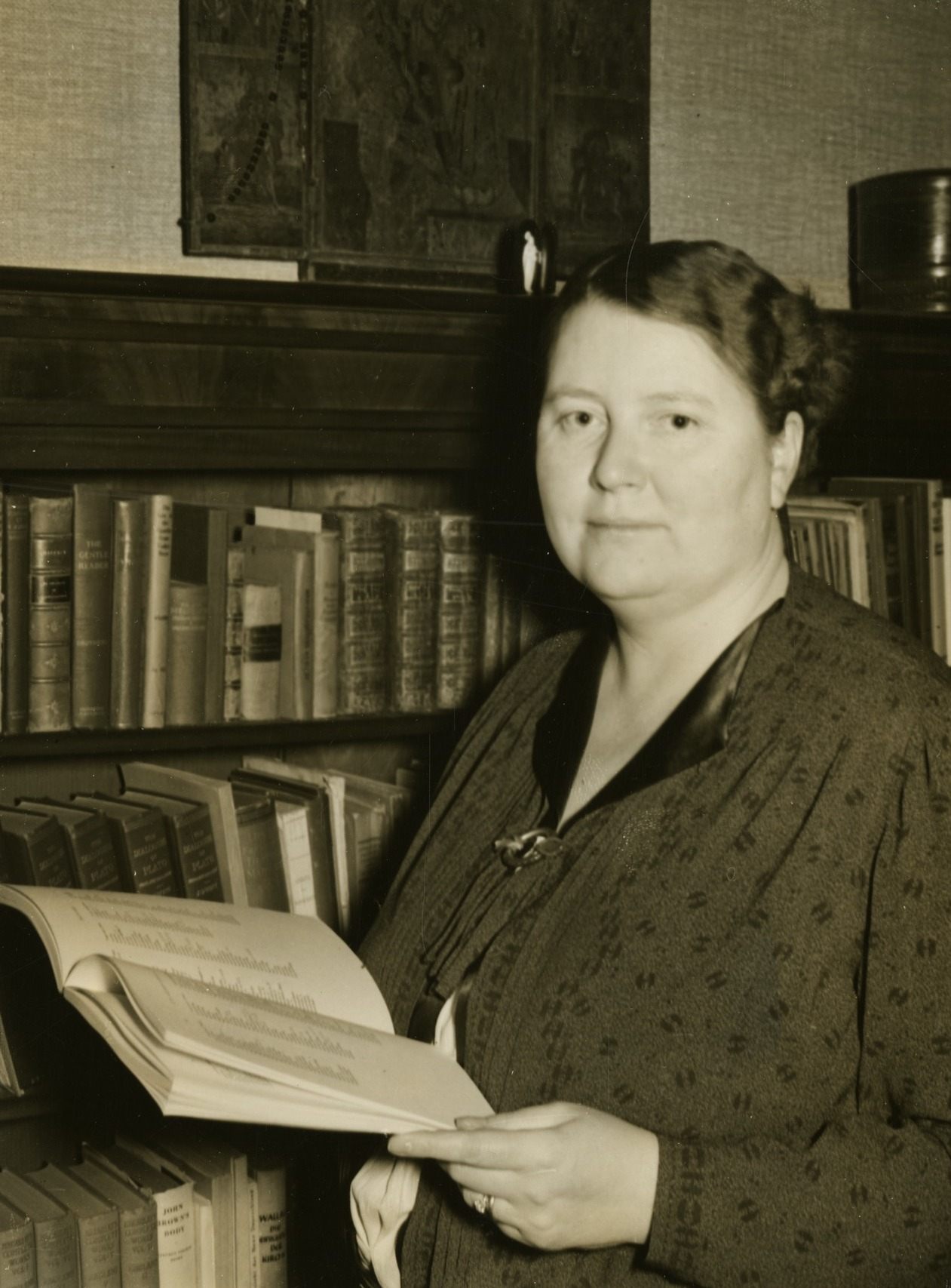
- Silva Tipple New Lake (1898-1983), from the Smithsonian Institution Archives (5493933195)
- Born: Silva Tipple; March 18, 1898; New Haven, Connecticut
- Died: April 30, 1983 (aged 85); South Pasadena, California
- Other names: Silva Lake, Silva Tipple New, Silva Tipple Lake
- Awards: Guggenheim Fellowship (1929, 1930)

Academic background
- Education: Brown University

Academic work
- Discipline: Classics; Archaeology
- Sub-discipline: New Testament scholarship
- Institutions: University of Vermont; Miss McClintock's School (Boston); Occidental College
- Notable works: An Introduction to the New Testament (1937, with Kirsopp Lake)

Silva Tipple New Lake (March 18, 1898 — April 30, 1983) was an American classics professor, archaeologist, and scholar of the New Testament. She was awarded Guggenheim Fellowships in 1929 and 1930, for work on Greek, Syriac and Armenian manuscripts.

== Early life and education ==
Silva Tipple was born in 1898, in New Haven, Connecticut, daughter of Bertrand M. Tipple and Jane Downs Tipple. She was raised in Italy, while her father was an ordained minister and a professor, founder of the Methodist International College in Rome. Her uncle Ezra Squier Tipple was also an academic, founder of Drew Theological Seminary. Silva Tipple attended Wellesley College before she married, then the University of Vermont, where she finished an undergraduate degree in 1924. She completed doctoral studies at Brown University in 1936.

== Career ==
Silva Tipple began her academic career as an instructor at her alma mater, the University of Vermont. She was also briefly the head of the classics department at Miss McClintock's School in Boston.

In 1929 and 1930, Silva Tipple New received Guggenheim Fellowships for research on the Greek, Syriac and Armenian manuscripts of the New Testament. In 1929 she joined an archaeological dig at Serabit, with further explorations at Samaria (1932 and 1934), and Van, Turkey (1938-1940).

Later in life, she was a member of the religion faculty at Occidental College, and served as President of the Pacific Coast Section of the National Association of Biblical Instructors. In the 1950s, she was the only woman on an international committee to compile a critical edition of the Greek New Testament. She lectured in the Pasadena area, and led students on summer tours of Europe and the Middle East in the 1950s. In the 1960s she taught an adult Bible class at St. James Episcopal Church in South Pasadena, California. In 1974 she was professor emerita at Occidental, and still active at her church.

== Publications ==
Publications by Silva Tipple New Lake included a new translation of the New Testament in 1928, "The Caesarean Text of the Gospel of Mark" (a 1929 article written with Kirsopp Lake and Robert P. Blake), Six Collations of New Testament Manuscripts (1932, edited with Kirsopp Lake), and An Introduction to the New Testament (1937, also with Kirsopp Lake), as well as many more technical reports. She was a founding editor of the textual criticism series Studies and Documents, and co-editor of Quantulacumque (1937), a collection of essays.

== Personal life ==
Silva Tipple married twice. Her first husband was writer Robert Warrington New; they married in 1918 and had three children together, Robert Jr., Silva Katherine, and Bertrand, before they divorced in 1932. Her second husband was her English-born mentor Kirsopp "Kay" Lake, whom she married in 1932. They had one son together, John A. Kirsopp Lake. She was widowed when Kirsopp Lake died in 1946. Her eldest son, Robert W. New Jr., was fatally stabbed in 1948. Silva Tipple New Lake died in South Pasadena, California on April 30, 1983. Her letters are with her second husband's, at Dumbarton Oaks Research Library. Some of her early papers are with her first husband's, in the Clarence Herbert New and Robert Warrington New Papers at Wake Forest University.

Her step-granddaughter Anne Lake Prescott is a professor in the English, Medieval & Renaissance Studies department at Barnard College.
