= Gift of Faith =

Gift of Faith may refer to:

- Fidei donum, "The gift of faith" List of encyclicals of Pope Pius XII
- A Gift of Faith, book by Sarah Price (author)
- The Gift of Faith, a book by Donald Wuerl
- "Gift of Faith", a song by Toto from the album Tambu
