= Mary Hinton =

Mary Hinton may refer to:

- Mary Hinton (academic), American academic and university administrator
- Mary Hinton (actress) (1896–1979), British stage-, film-, and television actress
- Mary Hilliard Hinton (1869–1961), American painter, historian, clubwoman, and anti-suffragist
