= Fiorentino (surname) =

Fiorentino is an Italian surname and a masculine given name. Notable people with the name include:

== Surname ==
- Adriano Fiorentino (1440–1499), also known as Adriano di Giovanni De' Maestri, was an Italian medallist and sculptor
- Daniele Fiorentino (born 1988), Italian professional football player
- Filippo Fiorentino (born 2008), Brazilian racing driver
- Francesco Fiorentino (philosopher) (1834–1884), Italian philosopher and historiographer
- Giosuè Fiorentino (1898–1977), Italian politician
- Giovanni Fiorentino, 14th-century Florentine writer
- Imero Fiorentino (1928–2013), American lighting designer
- James Fiorentino' American painter and illustrator
- Joe Fiorentino, Martial Arts Champion, Ellis Island Medal of Honor
- Jon Paul Fiorentino, Canadian poet, novelist, short story writer, editor, and professor
- Linda Fiorentino (born Clorinda Fiorentino), American film and television actress
- Melissa Fiorentino, American female boxer
- Nicole Fiorentino, American bass guitarist
- Peter Fiorentino (1968), Canadian retired professional ice hockey defenceman
- Rosso Fiorentino, (the Red Florentine), Italian Mannerist painter
- Sergio Fiorentino, Italian classical pianist
- Stefano Fiorentino (1301–1350), Italian painter of the time of Giotto
- Tony Fiorentino, American television color commentator

== Given name ==
- Fiorentino Sullo (1921–2000), Italian politician
