= Endlose Treppe =

- Endless Steps (English)
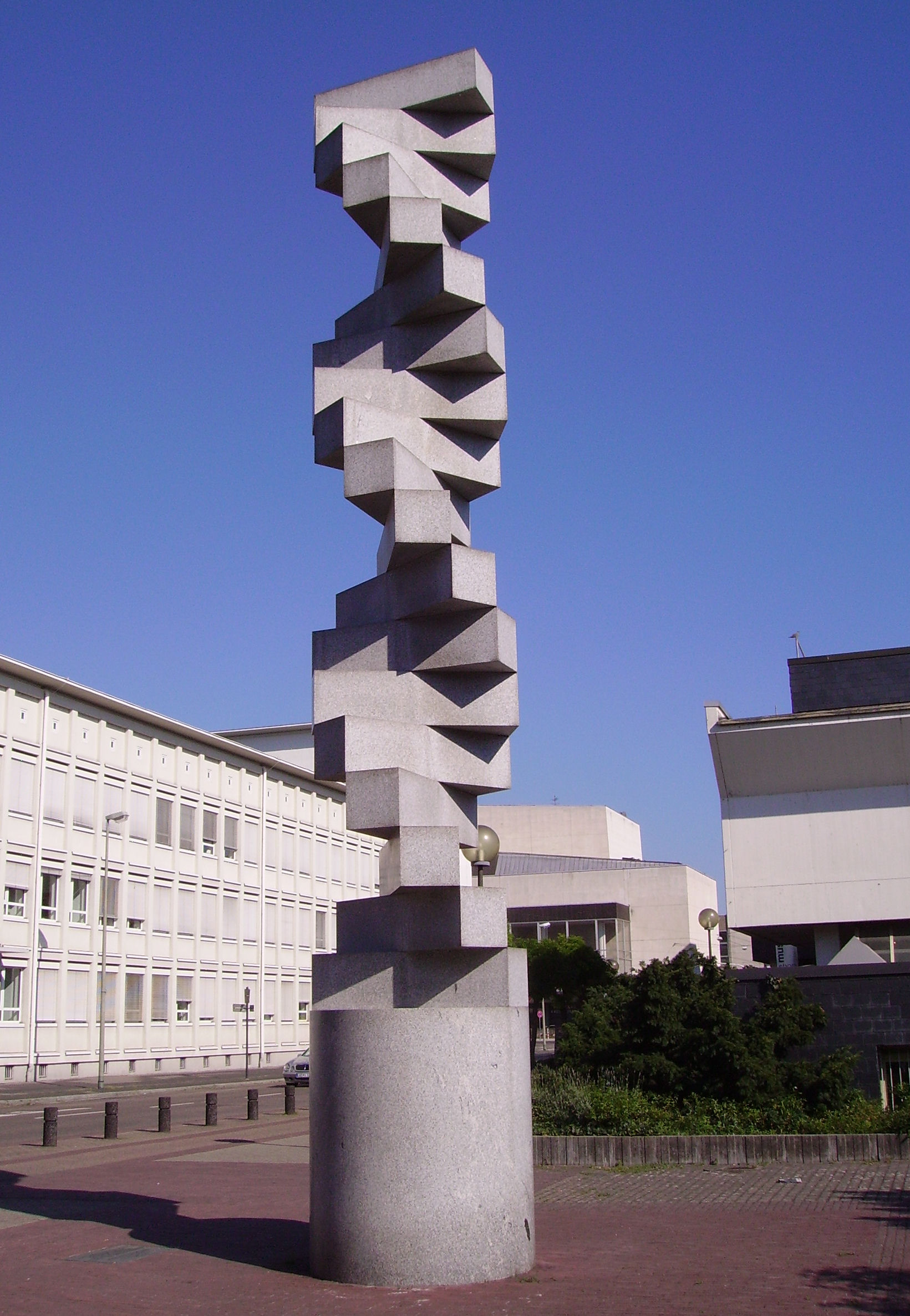
- Endlose Treppe
- Artist: Max Bill
- Year: 1991
- Medium: Granite
- Subject: Principal of Hope
- Location: Wilhelm-Hack-Museum; Ludwigshafen am Rhein; 49°28′49″N 8°26′38″E

The Endlose Treppe (meaning "Endless Steps" in German) is a sculpture made by the Swiss artist Max Bill in 1991 for the philosopher Ernst Bloch. It is made of North American granite.

It stands near the Wilhelm-Hack-Museum in the city-center of Ludwigshafen am Rhein. According to the artist, the 19 winding steps of granite, which stand nearly 10 meters, are supposed to represent Ernst Bloch's "principle of hope".
