= Fiorentino (disambiguation) =

Fiorentino may refer to:

== Places and jurisdictions ==
- Fiorentino, a commune of the Republic of San Marino

in Italy

- Fiorentino di Puglia = (Castel) Fiorentino, a Byzantine fortress that became the commune of Torremaggiore, province of Foggia
  - the Diocese of Fiorentino with seat in the above Apulian town, now a Latin Catholic titular see
- Castiglion Fiorentino: a walled city in eastern Tuscany, in the province of Arezzo
- Montelupo Fiorentino: a comune (municipality) in the province of Firenze (Florence) in Tuscany

== Other uses ==
- Italian adjective meaning 'Florentine', i.e. from Florence, Tuscany
- Fiorentino (surname)
