= Mary Hinton (academic) =

American academic

13th President of Hollins University
- Incumbent
- Assumed office August 2020
- Preceded by: Pareena Lawrence

15th President of the College of Saint Benedict
- In office 2014–2020
- Preceded by: MaryAnn Baenninger

Personal details
- Born: Kittrell, North Carolina, U.S.
- Spouse: Robert Williams
- Children: 3
- Education: Williams College; University of Kansas (MA); Fordham University (PhD)

Mary Dana Hinton is an American academic and university administrator. She served as the president of the College of Saint Benedict from 2014 to 2020, and was appointed as the president of Hollins University in August 2020. She is the first African-American president of Hollins. Prior to her presidencies, she served as the vice president for academic affairs at Mount Saint Mary College and as the vice president of academic affairs at Misericordia College.

== Early life and education ==
Hinton was born in Kittrell, North Carolina into a working-class family. She attended local public schools and was told by her guidance counselor that she should consider the military instead of pursuing higher education because of her race. With the help of a family that her mother worked for, Hinton was accepted at Saint Mary's School, an Episcopal boarding school for girls in Raleigh, North Carolina. In 1988, after high school, she studied psychology at Williams College, where she was awarded the bicentennial medal. She received a master's degree in clinical child psychology from the University of Kansas and a doctoral degree in religion and religious education from Fordham University.

== Career ==
Hinton began her career in education as an elementary schoolteacher in Maryland. After finishing graduate school, she worked for the nonprofit Replications, Inc., an organization that supports and opens public schools and works to improve educational outcomes in underserved communities. While with Replications she helped open twenty-two schools in New York and Baltimore.

She went on to work in administrative roles at various Catholic educational institutions, including as the vice president of academic affairs and as a diversity officer at Misericordia College. After working at Misericordia, Hinton accepted a position as the vice president for academic affairs at Mount Saint Mary College. After three years at Mount Saint Mary's, Hinton was appointed as the fifteenth president of the College of Saint Benedict, succeeding MaryAnn Baenninger, serving from 2014 to 2020. During her tenure, she oversaw several building and renovation projects on campus and authorized a $34,000,000 bond for building projects. In her capacity as president, Hinton also helped secure a $600,000 grant from the Andrew W. Mellon Foundation to implement inclusion and diversity training.

In June 2020, Hinton stepped down from the presidency at the College of Saint Benedict to take up the presidency of Hollins University in Roanoke, Virginia. She officially took office as the thirteenth president of Hollins in August 2020.

She is a member of the board of directors of Saint Mary's School, the Association of American Colleges and Universities, the Association of Catholic Colleges and Universities, Interfaith Youth Core, University Leadership Council, and the Council of Independent Colleges. She served as the chair of the Minnesota Private College Board of Presidents.

She wrote The Commercial Church: Black Churches and the New Religious Marketplace in America. She gave a TEDx Talk called Leading from the Margins.

== Personal life ==
Hinton is married to Robert Williams and has three children.
