= Bertrand M. Tipple =

American clergy and college founder

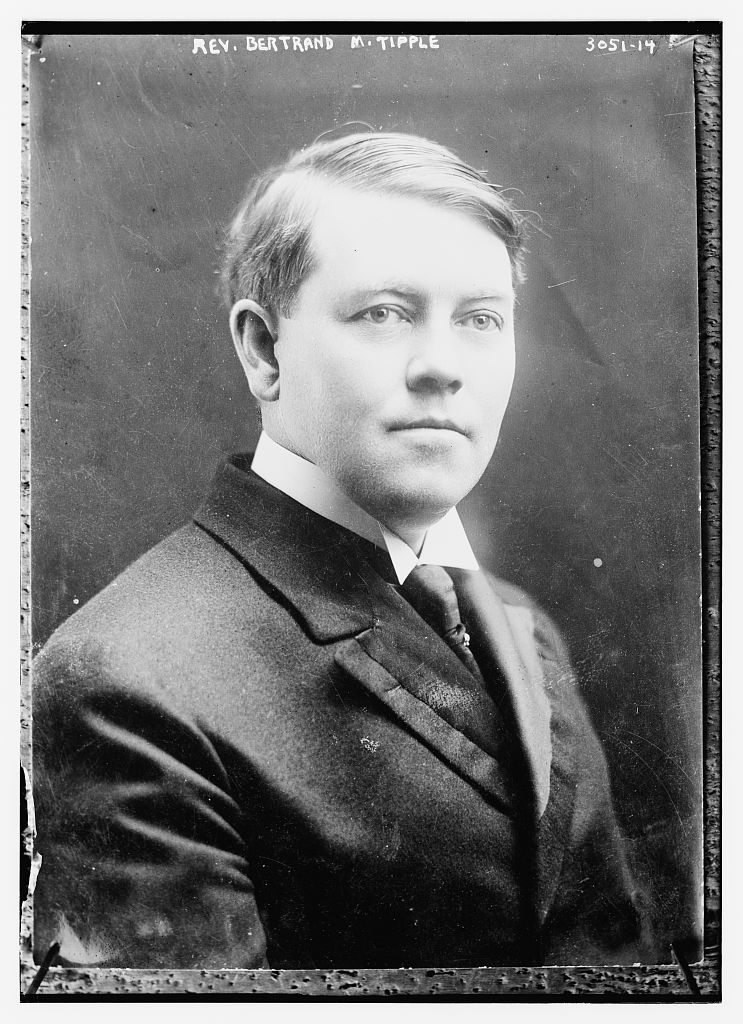
- Born: 1 December 1868; Camden, New York
- Died: 19 October 1952 (aged 83); South Pasadena, California
- Education: Syracuse University, Drew Theological Seminary
- Spouse: Jane Baldwin Downs
- Children: Silva, Elizabeth, Bertrand Squier, Marion

Ecclesiastical career
- Church: Methodist Episcopal Church
- Congregations: Epworth, Embury Memorial, and First M.E. Church
- Offices held: President of Methodist International College (Rome)

Bertrand Martin Tipple (1 December 1868 – 19 October 1952) was a Methodist writer, lecturer, and the founder and president of Methodist International College in Rome, Italy.

== Biography ==
Bertrand M. Tipple was born at Camden, Oneida County, New York on December 1, 1868, the son of Martin Tipple (7 March 1819 – 16 May 1901) and Sara Elizabeth Squier (June 1841 – 3 June 1916). His brother was Ezra Squier Tipple (1861–1936). He was educated at Cazenovia Seminary, graduating in 1890, then on to Syracuse University where he would receive his A.B. in 1894, and ten years later a D.D. (1904). While at Syracuse, he was a member of the Delta Upsilon fraternity, serving as recording secretary and president. He lived in the D.U. house and had as a fellow brother, also living in the house, Stephen Crane. During his college years he served as an editor for the monthly University Herald, played baseball, studied classical history, and was a member of Phi Beta Kappa society. He also served as a correspondent for the New York Tribune and the Mail and Express, and for the Post-Standard of Syracuse.

Following college, Tipple pursued a career as a clergyman. He studied at Drew Theological Seminary, graduating in 1897 with his B.D. degree and was ordained in the Methodist Episcopal Church. While at Drew, he served as assistant pastor of Grace M.E. Church, New York City. He married Jane Baldwin Downs on 2 June 1897. She was also a graduate of Syracuse (1895) and a member of Alpha Phi. He served as pastor of Epworth M.E. Church, New Haven, Connecticut, from 1897 till 1900. From 1900 until 1906 he was pastor of Embury Memorial M.E. Church, Brooklyn, New York; and then back to Connecticut as pastor of First M.E. Church, in Stamford until 1909.

In 1909 Tipple accepted a call to be pastor of the American Methodist Episcopal Church in Rome, Italy. The new position was to afford him the opportunity to pursue missionary work, for at the time there were only about ten members. He was very busy during his stay in Rome and accepted many new responsibilities. From 1910 until 1923 he was president of Reeder Theological Seminary, which prepared boys for the Methodist ministry in Italy. Perhaps most prominently, he was the founder and president of Methodist International College (Collegio Internazionale di Monte Mario) from 1911 until 1923. The Methodists were in continual conflict with the Vatican during Tipple's fourteen years in Rome. The most famous incident occurred in early April 1910, when ex-President Theodore Roosevelt, during his six-week tour through Europe, failed to meet with the Pope. The Pontiff did not want the ex-president to also call on the Methodist mission while in Rome. Roosevelt, who had had no intention of such a visit, was incensed by the restriction that Pius X seemed to be making on him and declined to call on him. The episode, which was mostly the result of misunderstandings, caused quite a stir. In 1914, Tipple secured six acres at the southern end of Monte Mario, one of the most beautiful locations near the city. He planned on a large-scale building program to expand the college; however, his plans were met with strong opposition from the Holy See. On 20 May 1922, the first of seven planned buildings was finally dedicated. Tipple resigned as president of the college on 20 November 1923, stating ill health as the necessitating cause, and shortly thereafter the new fascist government would stall and eventually stop the extensive building plans.

During 1910 to 1924 Tipple embarked on numerous lecture trips throughout the United States, Great Britain, France, and Germany. He was a delegate to the world convention of the YMCA at Robert College in Constantinople in 1911 and a delegate to the Ecumenical Conference in Edinburgh, 1913. From 1912 to 1924 he was correspondent-at-large in Europe and North Africa for The Christian Science Monitor. During World War I, he maintained social service rooms in the Methodist building in Rome for British and American soldiers and sailors. He was received at the Italian Court in 1910. In July, 1915, he was conferred Knight of the Order of the Crown of Italy (Cavaliere dell' Ordine della Corona d'Italia) by King Victor Emanuel III and in 1920 he was made Commander of the Order of the Crown of Italy for making Americans aware of Italy's sacrifice during the Great war. Tipple was also a Mason (33rd degree of Italy). In his later years he focused on traveling, lecturing and writing. He joined his daughter Silva Tipple New Lake on the American expedition to the ruins at Van Fortress, Turkey, in 1938-40. He died on 19 October 1952.
