= I Bid You Peace =

2026 documentary television miniseries about Jeff Smith

- Also known as: I Bid You Peace: The Rise & Fall of the Frugal Gourmet
- Genre: Documentary
- Written by: Chris Johnson
- Directed by: Chris Johnson
- Country of origin: United States
- Original language: English
- No. of seasons: 1
- No. of episodes: 5

Production
- Producer: Chris Johnson
- Editor: Ted Woerner
- Running time: 270 minutes

I Bid You Peace: The Rise & Fall of the Frugal Gourmet is a 2026 American documentary television miniseries about television chef Jeff Smith, host of the PBS cooking program The Frugal Gourmet. Directed and produced by filmmaker Chris Johnson, the five-episode series examines Smith’s career, public persona, and the sexual abuse allegations made against him in the 1990s that ended his television career.

The series was released in January 2026 and distributed independently through a transactional video-on-demand platform rather than through a traditional television network or subscription streaming service.

== Background ==
Jeff Smith (1939–2004) was an American television chef and author who gained national prominence as the host of The Frugal Gourmet, a cooking program that aired on PBS stations beginning in the 1980s. The program became one of the most widely broadcast cooking shows on public television during its run.

In 1997 several men filed a civil lawsuit accusing Smith of sexual abuse that they alleged occurred when they were teenagers working at a restaurant he operated in Tacoma, Washington in the 1970s. Smith denied the allegations. The lawsuits were later settled out of court in 1998, after which Smith withdrew from public life and his television career ended.

== Production ==
The documentary series was directed and produced by filmmaker Chris Johnson.

According to The New York Times, the production involved several years of research and included interviews with journalists, former colleagues of Smith, and individuals connected to the allegations, along with archival footage and legal records.

Notable interviewees include: Martin Yan and Kevin Clash

The five-episode series was released independently in January 2026 through a direct-to-consumer video-on-demand platform rather than through a traditional broadcaster or streaming service.

== Episodes ==
The first season consists of five episodes.

| No. | Title |
|---|---|
| 1 | I Peddle Enthusiasm |
| 2 | Keep Your Fingers Bent Under! |
| 3 | Dr. Jekyll & Mr. Hyde |
| 4 | Whatever I Do, I'm Forgiven |
| 5 | Peace? |

== Reception ==
Coverage of the series in several publications noted its examination of Smith’s rise as a public television personality and the allegations that led to the end of his career.

Writing in The New York Times, Julia Moskin described the series as a reexamination of Smith’s public image and legacy in light of the accusations made against him in the late 1990s.

The Chicago Tribune reported that the documentary revisits Smith’s influence as a television chef while also exploring the circumstances surrounding the allegations and their impact on his reputation.

Local news media like The News Tribune and WGN‑TV focused on the series’ interviews with survivors and others. They said the show revisited a crime that hadn’t been looked at closely before. NetflixJunkie gave a simple summary of what the documentary covers and where to stream it.

== See also ==
- Jeff Smith (chef)
