= Thomas B. Considine =

Thomas Considine

Commissioner of the New Jersey Department of Banking and Insurance
- In office February 8, 2010 – February 9, 2012
- Appointed by: Chris Christie
- Preceded by: William Rader
- Succeeded by: Kenneth E. Kobylowski

Personal details
- Born: Jersey City, New Jersey
- Education: Seton Hall University (BS, JD)
- Occupation: Former state cabinet officer and corporate CEO; current corporate director in health care & financial services.

Thomas B. Considine is a former state managed care and financial services commissioner. He is imm. past chief executive officer of the National Conference of Insurance Legislators (NCOIL) and the founder and managing partner of Gravilaur Solutions, LLC, a strategic consulting firm.

== Education ==
Considine graduated from Marist High School in Bayonne, New Jersey, where in 2018 he was inducted into the Marist Hall of Fame, for Professional Achievement.

He received his J.D. cum laude from the Seton Hall University School of Law and his B.S. magna cum laude from the W. Paul Stillman School of Business Administration at Seton Hall University. Additionally, he served on the Seton Hall University Alumni Board of Directors. He received the Seton Hall University W. Paul Still School of Business Alumni Service Award in 2012.

== Commissioner ==
Governor Chris Christie nominated Considine to serve as Commissioner of the New Jersey Department of Banking and Insurance (DOBI) on January 15, 2010.

Considine repealed several out-dated or burdensome regulations, led DOBI through reaccreditation by the National Association of Insurance Commissioners (NAIC) and Conference of State Banking Supervisors (CSBS) and fought insurance fraud.

While commissioner, Considine held leadership positions with the NAIC, including on its national Executive Committee, and also serving as the vice-chairman and chairman of the NAIC's northeast zone. He also chaired the NAIC Reinsurance Task Force, leading it during adoption of the NAIC's reinsurance models.

Considine stepped down to return to the private sector as COO of Magnacare on February 10, 2012.

== Professional career ==
Considine served as the chief executive officer of Meadowlands Hospital Medical Center (MHMC). Prior to this post he served as chief operating officer of Magnacare. Previous to this he served as Commissioner of the New Jersey Department of Banking and Insurance. Prior to being named Commissioner, Considine worked at MetLife, Inc. for nearly 17 years. He also served on a number of professional boards and financial services industry-related organizations.

NCOIL named Considine as its CEO effective January 1, 2016. He served until December 31, 2015. He serves as a corporate director for a number of corporations in the health & financial services sectors.

Following law school, Considine was a law clerk to Senior U.S. District Judge Clarkson Fisher of the U.S. District Court for the District of New Jersey.
