= Karola Bloch =

Polish-German architect, socialist, and feminist

Karola Bloch (born Karola Piotrkowska; January 22, 1905, Łódź — July 31, 1994, Tübingen) was a Polish-German architect, socialist, and feminist. She was the third wife of the German philosopher Ernst Bloch.

== Early life and education ==
Bloch was born into a Jewish-Polish textile manufacturing family that fled to Russia during the First World War. In Moscow she was an eyewitness to the October Revolution, an experience to which she attributes her lifelong devotion to socialism. In 1921 the family moved to Berlin, where she studied art with the Expressionist Ludwig Meidner. She met her future husband, the philosopher Ernst Bloch, in 1926. Karola began her architectural studies in Vienna then returned to study at the Technische Hochschule in Berlin as one of a small group of women. Karola was a devotee of the Neues Bauen; she was a student of Hans Poelzig and Bruno Taut, and through her friendship with Xanti Schawinsky she was able to spend time at the Bauhaus, though she was never officially enrolled. In Berlin she joined a leftist student club and devoted her energy to fighting fascism, joining the Communist Party of Germany in 1932. She also took courses at the Marxistische Arbeiterschule “Masch”, where she met the architect Hannes Meyer and the critic György Lukács. Friends of the Blochs in Berlin included Walter Benjamin and Siegfried Kracauer. The Blochs lived in the left-wing Künstlerkolonie Berlin in Wilmersdorf. When the Reichstag was burned in 1933 the colony was surrounded by Nazis; Karola was able to hide Ernst Bloch’s manuscripts and have them smuggled out. The Blochs fled to Switzerland where Karola finished her studies at the ETH Zurich. Due to the increasingly anti-Semitic atmosphere, they moved to Vienna, where they married in 1934.

== Work and life in exile ==
In Vienna Karola worked for the architect Jacques Groag, a student of Adolf Loos, and befriended Elias Canetti and Alma Mahler. In spite of the danger for Jews and Communists she also worked as an informant for the USSR, making risky trips to Poland. Her husband Ernst Bloch once said to her “You practice what I write in my philosophy.” After the Anschluss the couple fled to Paris, where Karola worked in the studio of Auguste Perret. In 1936 the couple moved to Prague, where Karola had a private design practice with the Bauhaus textile designer Friedl Dicker-Brandeis and was the architect of a single-family house in the Tatra mountains. Her son Jan-Robert was born in 1937. The couple emigrated to New York in 1938. Because Ernst Bloch did not speak English, Karola had to support the family alone by working as an architect. Karola worked as one of only two women in the office of Mayer & Whittlesey, where she worked on high-rises like 240 Central Park South. In the United States, the couple was reunited with other émigrés like Theodor Adorno and Hermann Broch. After moving to Cambridge, MA, Karola was commissioned to design a modern house for Harry Slochower in Andover, NJ. She also worked as a draftswoman for Stone and Webster, one of the largest engineering firms in the US, unaware that they were also working on the facilities for the Manhattan Project. She also worked for Leland & Larsen in Boston, and organized a group to help support Polish architects after the war. In 1943 Karola’s parents, brother, and sister-in-law were murdered in Treblinka after being forced to live in the Warsaw Ghetto.

== Work and life in Germany ==
In 1949 the couple returned to East Germany, where Ernst Bloch took a teaching position at the University of Leipzig. Karola Bloch worked designing typical plans for kindergartens and daycare centers under commission from the Deutsche Bauakademie (German Building Academy). 8,000 child care centers were built in the GDR during this time, many of them based on her plans. An example is two facilities that she designed and supervised at the Baumwollspinnerei in Leipzig in 1955, which are now protected under historic preservation laws. However, Karola’s modern approach was controversial during a time when more ornate Stalinist architecture was promoted. For this reason she urged her friend Hannes Meyer not to emigrate to the GDR. In 1957 Karola, who was also politically anti-Stalinist, was forced out of the Socialist Unity Party of Germany, which meant that she could no longer work as an architect. For several years she anonymously published articles aimed at women, on topics like more efficient kitchen design and how to read building plans. She also became a founding member of the International Union of Women Architects. When the Berlin Wall was erected on August 31, 1961, the Blochs, on a lecture trip in West Germany, did not return to Leipzig or the GDR, leaving all of their belongings behind. The couple moved to Tübingen where Ernst Bloch became a professor. Their marriage would last a total of 43 years, ending only with Ernst's death.

After 30 years of practicing as an architect Karola Bloch devoted herself entirely to the politics of prisoners and abused women, co-founding the organization Hilfe zur Selbsthilfe (Help for Self-Help). She was also active in the pro-choice movement organized by prominent feminist Alice Schwarzer in the early 1970s. When she was 76 years old, she traveled to Nicaragua to support the Sandinistas.

== Written works ==
- Aus meinem Leben (From My Life), Pfulligen (Nekse), 1981. ISBN 3-788-502-401
- Die Sehnsucht des Menschen, ein wirklicher Mensch zu werden. Reden und Schriften aus ihrer Tübinger Zeit (The Desire of the Human to Be a Real Human: Speeches and Writings from her Time in Tübingen), Mössingen-Talheim (Talheim Verlag), 1989. ISBN 3-893-760-032
- "For the Dignity of Woman" (1981), in German Feminist Writings, New York (Continuum), 2002.

== Edited volumes ==
- "Denken heißt Überschreiten": In memoriam Ernst Bloch 1885–1977 ("Thinking Means Transgressing": In Memory of Ernst Bloch 1885-1977), Eds. Karola Bloch and Adelbert Reif, Cologne/Frankfurt am Main (Europäische Verlagsanstalt), 1978. ISBN 3-548-351-522
- Lieber Genosse Bloch ...: Briefe von Rudi Dutschke, Gretchen Dutschke-Klotz und Karola Bloch 1968-1979 (Dear Comrade Bloch...: Letters from Rudi Dutschke, Gretchen Dutschke-Klotz, and Karola Bloch 1968-1979). Eds. Karola Bloch and Welf Schröter, Mössingen-Talheim (Talheimer Verlag), 1988. ISBN 3-893-760-016
- "Utopie und Hoffnung : Beiträge zur Aktualität Ernst Blochs (Utopia and Hope: Contributions to the Relevance of Ernst Bloch)", Eds. Karola Bloch and Jürgen C Strohmaier, Mössingen-Talheim (Talheim Verlag), 1989.
