= Steven M. Goldman =

American politician and attorney

Commissioner of the New Jersey Department of Banking and Insurance
- In office March 20, 2006 – July 15, 2009
- Appointed by: Jon Corzine
- Preceded by: Donald Bryan
- Succeeded by: Neil N. Jasey

Personal details
- Education: Boston University (AB); George Washington University Law School (JD); New York University School of Law (LLM)

Steven M. Goldman served as the Commissioner of Banking and Insurance of New Jersey from 2006 to 2009. He was nominated to the position in February 2006 by Governor of New Jersey Jon Corzine. Goldman is an attorney who specialized in banking and insurance law, prior to his appointment as commissioner. He was sworn into office on March 20, 2006, replacing Donald Bryan. He resigned on July 15, 2009.

Goldman came to the Department of Banking and Insurance after a 22-year career at Sills Cummis Epstein & Gross PC, where he focused on corporate law.

Goldman resides in Woodcliff Lake, and is a graduate of Boston University (political science), earned a LL.M. in taxation from the New York University School of Law and a J.D. from The George Washington University Law School.
