= Ernst Bloch =

German Marxist philosopher (1885–1977)

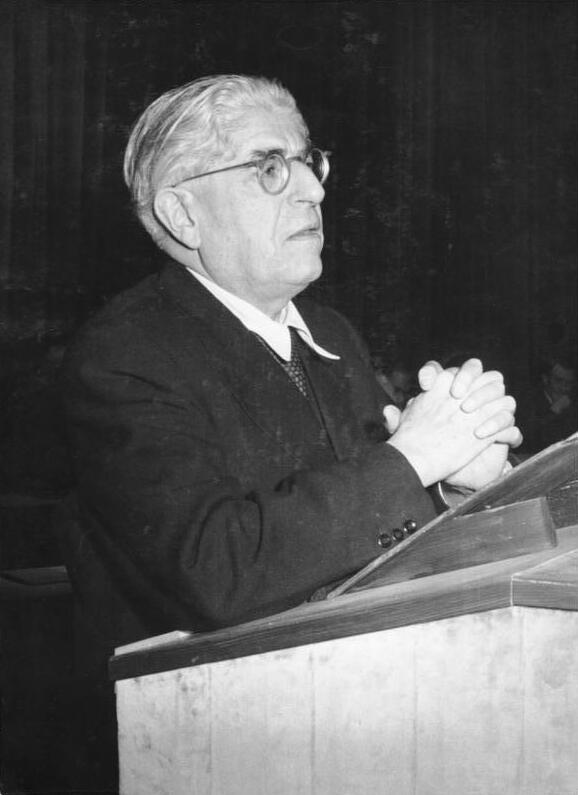
- Bloch in 1954
- Born: 8 July 1885; Ludwigshafen, Kingdom of Bavaria, German Empire
- Died: 4 August 1977 (aged 92); Tübingen, Baden-Württemberg, West Germany
- Other names: Karl Jahraus, Jakob Knerz

Education
- Education: Ludwig-Maximilians-Universität München; University of Würzburg (PhD, 1908)

Philosophical work
- Era: 20th-century philosophy
- Region: Western philosophy
- School: Western Marxism; Marxist hermeneutics
- Institutions: Leipzig University; University of Tübingen
- Main interests: Humanism, philosophy of history, nature, subjectivity, ideology, utopia, religion, theology
- Notable ideas: The principle of hope, non-simultaneity

Ernst Simon Bloch (/blɒk/; German: [ɛʁnst ˈblɔx]; 8 July 1885 – 4 August 1977) was a German Marxist philosopher. Bloch was influenced by Georg Wilhelm Friedrich Hegel and Karl Marx, as well as by apocalyptic and religious thinkers such as Thomas Müntzer, Paracelsus, and Jacob Böhme. He established friendships with György Lukács, Bertolt Brecht, Kurt Weill, Walter Benjamin, and Theodor W. Adorno. Bloch's work focuses on an optimistic ic teleology of the history of mankind.

== Life ==
Bloch was born in Ludwigshafen, the son of a Jewish railway employee. After studying philosophy, he married Else von Stritzky, daughter of a Baltic brewer in 1913, who died in 1921. His second marriage with Linda Oppenheimer lasted only a few years. His third wife was Karola Piotrowska, a Polish architect, whom he married in 1934 in Vienna. When the Nazis came to power, the couple had to flee, first to Switzerland, then to Austria, France, Czechoslovakia, and finally to the United States. He lived briefly in New Hampshire before settling in Cambridge, Massachusetts. It was there, in the reading room of Harvard's Widener Library, that Bloch wrote the lengthy three-volume work The Principle of Hope. He originally planned to publish it there under the title Dreams of a Better Life.

In 1948, Bloch was offered the chair of philosophy at Leipzig University, and he returned to East Germany to take up the position. In 1955, he was awarded the National Prize of the GDR. Additionally, he became a member of the German Academy of Sciences at Berlin (AdW). He had more or less become the political philosopher of the GDR. Among his many academic students from this period was his assistant Manfred Buhr, who earned his doctorate with him in 1957, and was later a professor in Greifswald, then director of the Central Institute of Philosophy of the Academy of Sciences (ADC) in Berlin and who became a critic of Bloch.

However, the Hungarian uprising in 1956 led Bloch to revise his view of the SED (Socialist Unity Party) regime, whilst retaining his Marxist orientation. Because he advocated humanistic ideas of freedom, he was obliged to retire in 1957 for political reasons – not because of his age, 72 years. A number of scientists and students spoke publicly against this forced retirement, among them the renowned professor and colleague Emil Fuchs and his students as well as Fuchs's grandson Klaus Fuchs-Kittowski.

When the Berlin Wall was built in 1961, he did not return to the GDR, but went to Tübingen in West Germany, where he received an honorary chair in Philosophy. He engaged with a Christian-Marxist intellectual dialogue group organized by Milan Machovec and others in the Czechoslovakia of the 1960s. He died in Tübingen.

== Thought ==
Bloch was a highly original and eccentric thinker. Much of his writing—in particular, his magnum opus The Principle of Hope—is written in a poetic, aphoristic style. The Principle of Hope tries to provide an encyclopedic account of mankind's and nature's orientation towards a socially and technologically improved future. This orientation is part of Bloch's overarching philosophy. Bloch believed the universe is undergoing a transition from its primordial cause (Urgrund) toward its final goal (Endziel). He believed this transition is effected through a subject-object dialectic, and he saw evidence for this process in all aspects of human history and culture.

== Influence ==
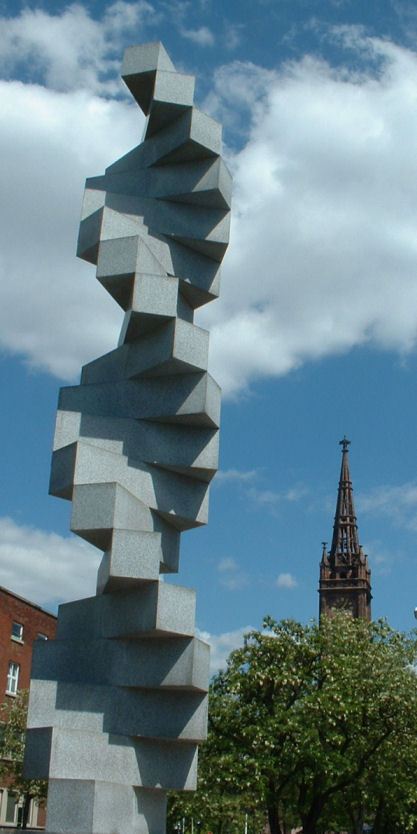
Endlose Treppe by Max Bill, which is dedicated to the Principle of Hope by Bloch

Bloch's work became influential in the course of the student protest movements in 1968 and in liberation theology. It is cited as a key influence by Jürgen Moltmann in his Theology of Hope (1967, Harper and Row, New York), by Dorothee Sölle, and by Ernesto Balducci. Psychoanalyst Joel Kovel has praised Bloch as, "the greatest of modern utopian thinkers". Robert S. Corrington has been influenced by Bloch, though he has tried to adapt Bloch's ideas to serve a liberal rather than a Marxist politics.

Bloch's concept of concrete utopias found in The Principle of Hope was used by José Esteban Muñoz to shift the field of performance studies. This shift allowed for the emergence of utopian performativity and a new wave of performance theorizing as Bloch's formulation of utopia shifted how scholars conceptualize the ontology and the staging of performances as imbued with an enduring indeterminacy, as opposed to dominant performance theories found in the work of Peggy Phelan, who view performance as a life event without reproduction.

== Bibliography ==
=== Books ===
- Geist der Utopie (1918) (The Spirit of Utopia, Stanford, 2000)
- Thomas Müntzer als Theologe der Revolution (1921) (Thomas Müntzer as Theologian of Revolution)
- Spuren (1930) (Traces, Stanford University Press, 2006)
- Erbschaft dieser Zeit (1935) (Heritage of Our Times, Polity, 1991)
- Freiheit und Ordnung (1947) (Freedom and Order)
- Subjekt-Objekt (1949)
- Christian Thomasius (1949)
- Avicenna und die aristotelische Linke (1949) (Avicenna and the Aristotelian Left, Columbia, 2019)
- Das Prinzip Hoffnung (3 vols.: 1938–1947) (The Principle of Hope, MIT Press, 1986)
- Naturrecht und menschliche Würde (1961) (Natural Law and Human Dignity, MIT Press 1986)
- Tübinger Einleitung in die Philosophie (1963) (A Philosophy of the Future, Herder and Herder 1970)
- Religion im Erbe (1959–66) (trans.: Man on His Own, Herder and Herder, 1970)
- On Karl Marx (1968) Herder and Herder, 1971.
- Atheismus im Christentum (1968) (trans.: Atheism in Christianity, 1972)
- Politische Messungen, Pestzeit, Vormärz (1970) (Political Measurements, the Plague, Pre-March)
- Das Materialismusproblem, seine Geschichte und Substanz (1972) (The Problem of Materialism, Its History and Substance)
- Experimentum Mundi. Frage, Kategorien des Herausbringens, Praxis (1975) (Experimentum Mundi. Question, Categories of Realization, Praxis)

=== Articles ===
- “Causality and Finality as Active, Objectifying Categories: Categories of Transmission”. Telos 21 (Fall 1974). New York: Telos Press
- “Hitlers Gewalt”. Das Tagebuch 5, April 12, 1924, pp. 474-77 (Hitler’s Violence)

== See also ==
- Exilliteratur
