= Lectionary 301 =

Lectionary ℓ 301
- New Testament manuscript
- Text: Evangelistarium
- Date: 13th century
- Script: Greek
- Found: 1869
- Now at: Drew University
- Size: 32.8 cm by 22.9 cm
- Type: Byzantine text-type

Lectionary 301 (Gregory-Aland), designated by siglum ℓ 301 (in the Gregory-Aland numbering) is a Greek manuscript of the New Testament, on parchment. Palaeographically it has been assigned to the 13th century. The manuscript is lacunose.

== Description ==
The original codex contained lessons from the Gospel of John, Matthew, and Luke (Evangelistarium), on 334 parchment leaves. The leaves are measured (32.8 cm by 22.9 cm).

The text is written in Greek minuscule letters, in two columns per page, 19 lines per page. The manuscript contains weekday Gospel lessons for Church reading from Easter to Pentecost and Saturday/Sunday Gospel lessons for the other weeks.

It contains music notes.

== History ==
Gregory dated the manuscript to the 12th century. It is presently assigned by the INTF to the 13th century.

Albert L. Long, brought the manuscript in 1869 from Constantinople to America.

The manuscript was added to the list of New Testament manuscripts by Caspar René Gregory (number 301^{e}). Scrivener did not list this manuscript.

The text of the manuscript was examined by Charles Fremont Sitterly.

Currently the codex is housed at Drew University (Ms. 2) in Madison, New Jersey.

== See also ==
- List of New Testament lectionaries
- Biblical manuscript
- Textual criticism
- Lectionary 300

== Bibliography ==
- Gregory, Caspar René (1900). Textkritik des Neuen Testaments, Vol. 1. Leipzig: J.C. Hinrichs’sche Buchhandlung. p. 413.
- K. Clark, Descriptive catalogue of Greek New Testament manuscripts in America (1937), pp. 36-38.
- Charles Fremont Sitterly, Praxis in Manuscripts of the Greek Testament (New York, 1898), IX.
