= Donald Bryan =

American politician

Acting Commissioner of the New Jersey Department of Banking and Insurance
- In office March 1, 2005 – March 1, 2006
- Appointed by: Richard Codey; Jon Corzine
- Preceded by: Holly Bakke
- Succeeded by: Steven M. Goldman
- In office October 3, 2001 – March 12, 2002
- Appointed by: Donald DiFrancesco; Jim McGreevey
- Preceded by: Karen L. Suter
- Succeeded by: Holly Bakke

Donald Bryan is the former Acting Commissioner of Banking and Insurance in New Jersey. A career employee of his department, served as Director of the Division of Insurance from 1999 to 2006, where he served two separate stints as acting commissioner.

Commissioner Bryan first served as acting commissioner from October 2001 to February 2002, under former Governors Donald DiFrancesco and James McGreevey. He was reappointed acting commissioner in 2004 by former Gov. Richard Codey and served for the entire Codey Administration.

Gov. Jon Corzine announced that he was retaining Commissioner Bryan for the first few weeks of his term, while he searched for a new commissioner. In February 2006, Governor Corzine nominated Steven M. Goldman as commissioner, replacing Bryan.

Commissioner Bryan is a graduate of the University of Virginia and Rutgers University School of Law.
