= Daniele Fiorentino =

Italian football player (born 1988)

Personal information
- Date of birth: 4 November 1988 (age 37)
- Place of birth: Terlizzi, Italy
- Height: 1.80 m (5 ft 11 in)
- Position: Midfielder

Team information
- Current team: Molfetta Sportiva

Youth career
- Bari

Senior career*
Years	Team	Apps	(Gls)
2007–2010	Bari	9	(1)
2008	→ Pro Patria (loan)	1	(0)
2008–2009	→ Venezia (loan)	0	(0)
2009	→ Paganese (loan)	1	(0)
2009–2010	→ Noicattaro (loan)	19	(0)
2010	→ Andria BAT (loan)	1	(0)
2010–2011	San Paolo Bari	24	(2)
2011–2013	Martina	52	(1)
2013	Bisceglie	12	(0)
2013–2014	Real Metapontino	9	(1)
2014	Team Altamura	10	(1)
2014–2015	Nardò	19	(0)
2015–2016	Gravina	31	(5)
2016–2017	Team Altamura	18	(2)
2017	Casarano	0	(0)
2017	Barletta	8	(0)
2017–2019	Bitonto	44	(3)
2019	Fortis Altamura		
2019–2020	United Sly		
2021	Città Di Mola		
2021–2022	Nardò	9	(1)
2022	Manfredonia		
2022–2023	US Mola		
2023–	Molfetta Sportiva		
- * Club domestic league appearances and goals as of 22:15, 19 December 2019 (UTC)

Daniele Fiorentino (born 4 November 1988) is an Italian professional football player who plays for Molfetta Sportiva.

== Career ==
=== United Sly ===
On 9 December 2019 it was confirmed, that Fiorentino had joined Promozione club United Sly FC.
