= The Principle of Hope =

1954 book by Ernst Bloch

- Cover of the German edition
- Author: Ernst Bloch
- Original title: Das Prinzip Hoffnung
- Translators: Neville Plaice, Stephen Plaice, Paul Knight
- Language: German
- Subject: Utopias
- Published: 1954 (in German); 1986 (MIT Press, in English)
- Publication place: Germany
- Media type: Print (Hardcover and Paperback)
- ISBN: 978-0262521994 (vol. 1); 978-0262522007 (vol. 2); 978-0262522014 (vol. 3)

The Principle of Hope (German: Das Prinzip Hoffnung) is a book by the Marxist philosopher Ernst Bloch, published in three volumes in 1954, 1955, and 1959, in which the author explores utopianism, studying the utopian impulses present in art, literature, religion and other forms of cultural expression, and envisages a future state of absolute perfection. The Principle of Hope has become fundamental to dialogue between Christians and Marxists.

== Background ==
Originally written between 1938 and 1947 in the United States, an enlarged and revised version of The Principle of Hope was published successively in three volumes in 1954, 1955, and 1959. Bloch, who had emigrated to the United States in 1938, returned to Europe in 1949 and became a Professor of Philosophy in East Germany. Despite having initially supported the regime, Bloch came under attack for his philosophical unorthodoxy, and support for greater cultural freedom in East Germany, and publication of The Principle of Hope was delayed for political reasons.

== Reception ==
The philosopher Leszek Kołakowski calls The Principle of Hope Bloch's magnum opus, writing it contains all of Bloch's important ideas. The work has been described as "monumental" by philosopher Robert S. Corrington, and psychoanalyst Joel Kovel. Helmut Schelsky, on the other hand, had attested Bloch never to have understood the least bit about dialectics.

== See also ==
- Socialism with a human face
