= New Jersey Department of Banking and Insurance =

State agency of New Jersey, United States

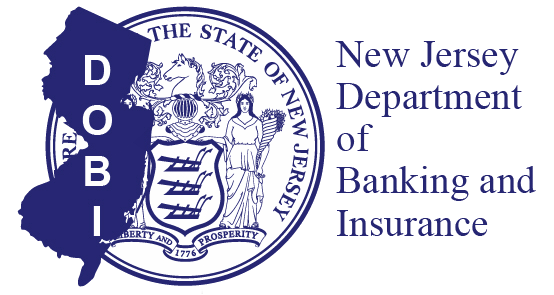
- Logo of the NJDOBI

Department overview
- Formed: February 10, 1891; 135 years ago
- Jurisdiction: Government of New Jersey
- Headquarters: Mary Roebling Building 20 West State Street, Trenton, New Jersey
- Annual budget: US$80 million (FY2027)
- Department executive: Susan Ochs, Acting Commissioner
- Website: www.nj.gov/dobi/index.html

The New Jersey Department of Banking and Insurance (NJDOBI) is one of 15 principal departments in New Jersey government. The department's mission is to regulate the banking, insurance and real estate industries in a professional and timely manner that protects and educates consumers and promotes the growth, financial stability and efficiency of these industries. The Commissioner of DOBI is Justin Zimmerman.

The department includes three divisions: Banking; Insurance; and the Real Estate Commission.

== History ==
Under the New Jersey State Constitution, all executive and administrative offices are allocated among not more than 20 principal departments. Following the ratification of the 1947 State Constitution, the DOBI was one of 13 departments created. In 1970, the department was split into two separate departments, Banking and Insurance respectively, only to be merged back together in 1996 as a cost savings measure by Governor Christine Todd Whitman.

Since 1996, the commissioners of DOBI have been:

Name	Term
Elizabeth Randall	June 28, 1996 - August 24, 1998
Jaynee LaVecchia	August 24, 1998 - January 18, 2000
Karen L. Suter	January 18, 2000 - October 3, 2001
Donald Bryan (acting)	October 3, 2001 - March 12, 2002
Holly Bakke	March 13, 2002 - March 1, 2005
Donald Bryan (acting)	March 1, 2005 - March 1, 2006
Steven M. Goldman	March 1, 2006 - July 16, 2009
Neil N. Jasey (acting)	July 17, 2009 - January 18, 2010
William Rader (acting)	January 19, 2010 - February 8, 2010
Thomas B. Considine	February 8, 2010 – February 9, 2012
Kenneth E. Kobylowski	February 10, 2012 – July 10, 2015
Richard J. Badolato	June 22, 2015 - December, 2017
Marlene Caride	January 16, 2018 – June 27, 2023
Justin Zimmerman (acting)	June 27, 2023 – November 4, 2024
Justin Zimmerman	November 4, 2024 – Present

== Division of Banking ==
The Division of Banking licenses and regulates all state-chartered financial institutions, currently numbering 88 banks and 19 credit unions. The division has been accredited by the Conference of State Bank Supervisors (CSBS) since 1986 and earned a five-year reaccreditation in 2010.

The division's duties, specifically the Office of Depositories, include overseeing the financial solvency of state-chartered banks and savings & loan institutions while also enforcing actions against those in violation of the department's regulations. The division also processes and reviews applications by depository institutions for new charters, branches, relocations, plans of acquisition, mergers, bulk sales, stock conversions and auxiliary offices.

The Office of Consumer Finance conducts similar financial solvency examinations on credit unions and also regulates and responds to complaints relating to a number of different types of licensed lenders, which include:

- Mortgage Banker;
- Correspondent Mortgage Banker;
- Mortgage Broker;
- Secondary Lender;
- Consumer Lender;
- Sales Finance Company;
- Mortgage Solicitor;
- Motor Vehicle Installment Seller;
- Home Repair Contractor/Home Repair Salesperson;
- Home Financing Agency;
- Pawnbroker;
- Insurance Premium Finance Company;
- Debt Adjuster (Non-Profit Consumer Credit Agency);
- Foreign Money Transmitter;
- Money Transmitter; and
- High Cost Home Loan Credit Counselor.

The Real Estate Commission, which is located within the Division of Banking, ensures that members of the real estate industry comply with existing laws and regulations. When violations are suspected, the Commission investigates these claims and either resolves them or conducts hearings concerning the violations. Additionally, the Commission registers all licensed brokers in the state and inspects their operations and offices. The formal Commission consists of 8 members (7 appointed by the Governor and one government representative) that conduct hearings related to potential violations.

== Division of Insurance ==
The Division of Insurance regulates the state's insurance industry, including the life, health, and property & casualty insurance industries. The division currently employs approximately 330 individuals in four units. The division was reaccredited in 2010 by the National Association of Insurance Commissioners (NAIC) for five years.

Among its tasks, the division oversees the solvency of the various companies and ensures consumer protections while periodically examining the licensed entities within the industry for compliance issues. Additionally, the division licenses and regulates insurance agents and brokers (producers).

The Property & Casualty Section is charged with the regulation of rates, rules and forms for property and casualty insurance. The section regulates personal, commercial and title insurance sold in the state.

The Life & Health Bureaus are responsible for the review and approval of life insurance forms, annuity contracts and synthetic guaranteed investment contract (GIC) forms issued in New Jersey to ensure that they comply with insurance laws and regulations and the review and approval of individual and group health insurance contracts and rates within the department's jurisdiction, respectively.

The division also oversees New Jersey's Individual Health Coverage (IHC) Program and Small Employer Health (SEH) Program for companies employing 2-50 employees. Through the IHC, people without access to employer or government sponsored health care programs can purchase health coverage for themselves and their families from a variety of private carriers, regardless of their age or health status. The SEH establishes standard health benefit plans and ensures that small employers: have access to small group health benefits plans without regard to the occupation of the group, or the health status of any of the group's members; and have the ability to renew the coverage from year to year regardless of the group's claims experience or any changes in the health status of the group's members. Additionally, NJ Protect is the state's federally subsidized health insurance option for those residents with pre-existing medical conditions.

The Office of Solvency Regulation represents a major portion of the department's core mission in the regulation of the financial solvency of New Jersey's licensed insurers. Due to the large number of multi-state insurers, the department utilizes a national state-based system of regulation in order to help meet this core mission. The Office's Captives Unit oversees New Jersey's captive insurance market, which opened for business in 2011 and currently includes ten captive insurers.

The Office of Consumer Protection Services investigates regulated industries for violations and is responsible for enforcement actions when any such violations are uncovered.

The Bureau of Fraud Deterrence handles investigations and prosecutions for civil insurance fraud violations following the transfer of these responsibilities from the Office of Insurance Fraud Prosecutor within the Department of Law and Public Safety as part of the FY 2010 state budget.

== Location ==
The department's main offices are located in the Mary Roebling Building at 20 West State Street (corner of West State Street and North Warren Street), in Trenton. The department also maintains a consumer center in Newark along with offices in Cherry Hill and Whippany.

== Related legislation ==
- 1891: Act of February 10, 1891, P.L. 1891, c. 6
- 1948: Department of Banking and Insurance Act of 1948, P.L. 1948, c. 88
- 1970: Act of February 16, 1970, P.L. 1970, c. 11
- 1970: Department of Insurance Act of 1970, P.L. 1970, c. 12
- 1996: Department of Banking and Insurance Act of 1996, P.L. 1996, c. 45
