= Robert S. Corrington =

American philosopher, academic (born 1950)

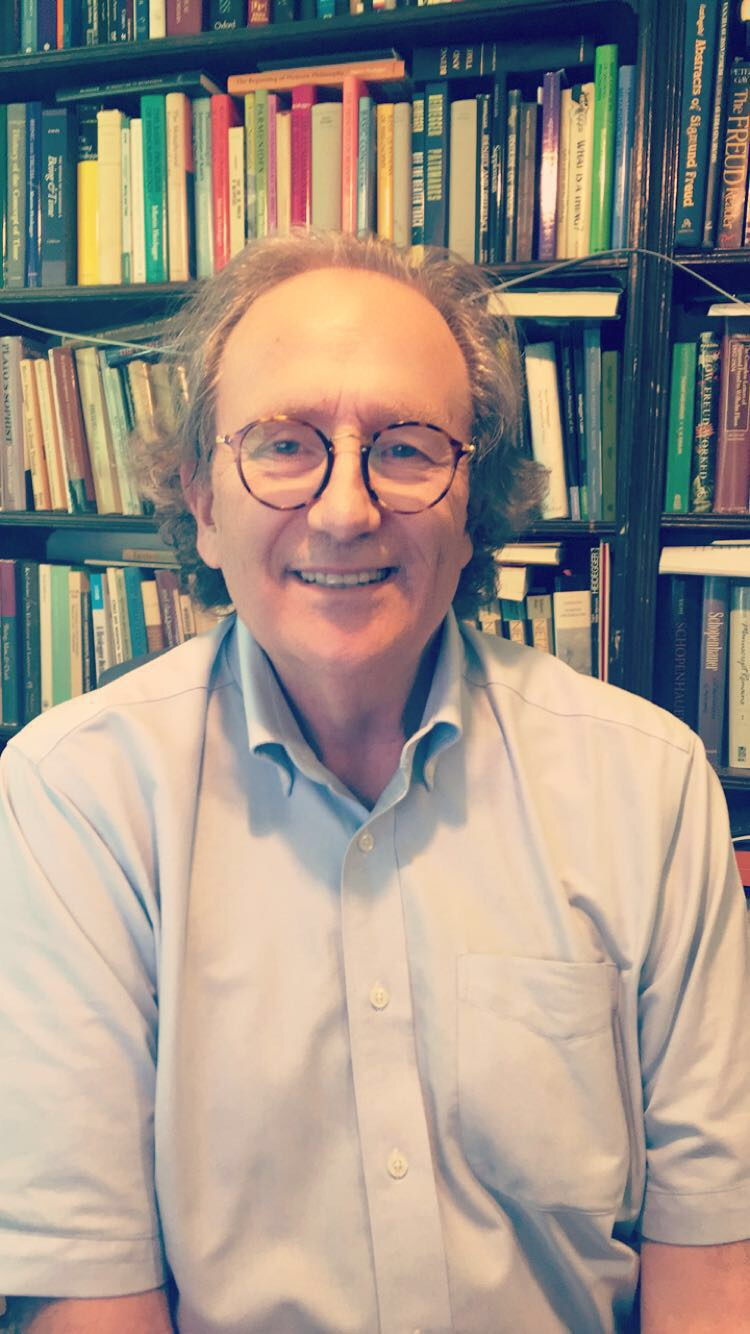
- Born: May 30, 1950 (age 76)

Philosophical work
- Era: Modern
- Region: Western
- Notable ideas: Ecstatic naturalism

Robert S. Corrington (born May 30, 1950) is an American philosopher and author of many books exploring human interpretation of the universe as well as biographies on C.S. Peirce and Wilhelm Reich. He is currently the Henry Anson Buttz Professor of Philosophical Theology at Drew University in Madison, New Jersey. Before that he was a professor at Pennsylvania State University. He is a Senior Fellow of the American Institute for Philosophical and Cultural Thought.

Corrington is member of Unitarian Universalist Association and The Theosophical Society of America and a lecturer for both organizations, and he is also an affiliate of The Parapsychological Association.

== Ecstatic naturalism ==
Robert S. Corrington's work contributes to philosophical and theological inquiry through the development of a perspective called 'ecstatic naturalism’. Ecstatic naturalism, also referred to as ‘deep pantheism’ or ‘religious naturalism,’ has emerged through Corrington's eleven books and over eighty articles on the subject. His influences are many and range across the disciplines of philosophy, theology, science, and psychology. Deep appreciation of the American philosophers Charles Sanders Peirce, William James, George Santayana, Justus Buchler and John Dewey grounds Corrington's insights in a pragmatist mode even as his work creatively extends this tradition philosophically through a psychologically sophisticated semiotics with the aid of Carl Jung, Otto Rank, Heinz Kohut, and Julia Kristeva and theologically through liberal Protestant thinkers Friedrich Schleiermacher and Paul Tillich toward a Hindu-inspired Emersonian post-Christian nature spirituality. Ernst Bloch is another influence on Corrington.

As an alternative to contemporary metaphysical perspectives that are either too dependent upon a brute descriptive materialism on the one hand or to an honorific process cosmology on the other, ecstatic naturalism, like all versions of naturalism, assumes that nature is all there is; there is no recourse made to supernaturalistic forces or entities. For Corrington, however, ‘nature’ does not refer to anything, but is the dynamic entirety, an extremely wide and deeply vast reality that creates itself out of itself alone. In order to effectively speak or theorize about nature, then, Corrington has picked up on “a distinction dear to Averroes, Thomas of Aquinas, Baruch Spinoza, and Ralph Waldo Emerson (among others)” between natura naturans (nature naturing) and natura naturata (nature natured). (A Semiotic Theory p. 40) The perspective of ecstatic naturalism attempts to remain accountable to the insights of evolutionary sciences even as it probes ever deeper into those aspects of nature that elude strictly scientific inquiries. As a naturalist, Corrington is deeply suspicious of teleological descriptions of nature and finds in Arthur Schopenhauer's ‘will to life’ a foundational ‘intention’ in organisms which anticipates Darwinian explanations of life's perpetuation.

== Bibliography ==
Robert S. Corrington is the author of 12 books and 80 articles in the fields of philosophy, theosophy, theology, psychoanalysis, and semiotics as well as editor of several books on metaphysics and semiotics. He has also authored two plays.

Books

- Editor (with Hausman, Carl and Seebohm, Thomas M.): Pragmatism Considers Phenomenology (1987)
- The Community of Interpreters: On the Hermeneutics of Nature and the Bible in the American Philosophical Tradition (1987, 2nd ed. 1995)
- Editor (with Marsoobian, Armen and Wallace, Kathleen): Buchler, Justus Metaphysics of Natural Complexes (1990)
- Editor (with Marsoobian, Armen and Wallace, Kathleen): Nature's Perspective: Prospects of Ordinal Metaphysics (1991)
- Nature and Spirit: An Essay in Ecstatic Naturalism (1992)
- An Introduction to C.S. Peirce: Philosopher, Semiotician, and Ecstatic Naturalist (1993)
- Ecstatic Naturalism: Signs of the World (1994)
- Nature's Self: Our Journey from Origin to Spirit (1996)
- Nature's Religion (1997)
- A Semiotic Theory of Theology and Philosophy (2000)
- Wilhelm Reich: Psychoanalyst and Radical Naturalist (2003)
- Riding the Windhorse: Manic Depressive Disorder and the Quest for Wholeness (2003)
- Nature's Sublime: An Essay In Aesthetic Naturalism (2013)
- Deep Pantheism: Toward a New Transcendentalism (2016)
- Nature and Nothingness: An Essay in Ordinal Phenomenology (2016)

Plays

- Black Hole Sonata (or Waiting for Steven Hawking)
- One, Two, Three

Robert S. Corrington has also contributed to numerous academic journals, e.g., International Philosophical Quarterly, the American Journal of Semiotics, American Journal of Theology and Philosophy, Transactions of the C.S. Peirce Society, The Journal of Speculative Philosophy: New Series, The Southern Journal of Philosophy, Journal for the Study of Religion, Nature and Culture, and Semiotica.

== Affiliations ==
- International Association of Semiotic Studies
- Institute for Religious and Philosophical Thought (executive board, 1992–95)
- American Academy of Religion
- American Philosophical Association
- C.S. Peirce Society
- North American Paul Tillich Society
- Society for the Advancement of American Philosophy
- Karl Jaspers Society of North America
- Semiotic Society of America (executive board, 1992–94)
- C.G. Jung Foundation for Analytical Psychology
- Unitarian Universalist Association
- Theosophical Society of America

== See also ==
- Panentheism
- Pantheism
- American philosophy
- List of American philosophers
- The Principle of Hope

== Sources ==
- Robert S. Corrington's home page at Drew University (see below)
- "CORRINGTON, Robert S 1950–". Contemporary Authors. Vol. 227. Gale Research Company. 2005. pp. 66–67. ISBN 0-7876-6707-2.
