= Sarah Price (author) =

American novelist

Sarah Price is a Christian fiction novelist and adult and children's author of over 40 books. Much of her writing focuses on the Anabaptist heritage and the Old Order Amish. Her paternal grandparents, Sarah Marie Alderfer and Harlan Nice, were born into an Old Order Mennonite Church in Pennsylvania in the early 1900s. With her Anabaptist upbringing, Price was drawn to the culture of the Amish of Lancaster County where she has connections with Amish communities.

Most recently, Price has adapted the Jane Austen books into an Amish setting.

She went to Drew University in Madison, New Jersey to study anthropology and holds three other advanced degrees.

Price is married with children. She lives in Morristown, New Jersey.

== Awards ==
Price has been on the ECPA best sellers list multiple times and Amazon’s Top 100 authors’ list in 2013, 2014, and 2015.

== List of works ==
The following collection of listed books have been published by Realms, an imprint of Charisma House Publishers:

=== The Amish Classics ===
- First Impressions, May 2014
- The Matchmaker, February 2015
- Second Chances, May 2015
- Sense and Sensibility, March 2016

=== Other books ===
- Secret Sister: An Amish Christmas Tale, October 2015

The following collection of listed books have been published by Waterfall Press, an imprint of Brilliance Audio, Amazon Publishing.

=== The Plain Fame Series ===
- Plain Fame, September 2015 (originally self-published in 2012; Amazon Top 100 best seller)
- Plain Change, September 2015 (originally self-published in 2012; Amazon Top 100 best seller)
- Plain Again, September 2015 (originally self-published in 2013)
- Plain Return, October 2015
- Plain Choice, March 2016

=== Other books ===
- An Amish Buggy Ride, November 2014
- An Empty Cup, April 2015—Amazon Top 100 Best Seller

== Self-published books ==
=== The Amish of Lancaster Series ===
- Fields of Corn, December 2007
- Hills of Wheat, January 2012
- Pastures of Faith, March 2012
- Valley of Hope, December 2012

=== The Tomato Patch Series ===
- The Tomato Patch, July 2012
- The Quilting Bee, October 2012
- The Hope Chest, February 2013
- The Clothes Line, July 2013

=== Amish Seasons ===
- An Amish Spring, March 2015
- An Amish Summer, June 2015
- An Amish Autumn, July 2015
- An Amish Winter, July 2015

=== Other books ===
- An Amish Christmas Carol, December 2012
- Amish Circle Letters, January 2014
- Amish Circle Letters II, February 2014
- Amish Faith, November 2013
- A Christmas Gift for Rebecca, February 2014
- A Gift of Faith, December 2013
- Gypsy in Black, July 2011
- Meet Me in Heaven, January 2013 (with Ella Stewart)
- Plain & Simple Traditions: Amish & Mennonite Holidays, December 2014
- Pink Umbrellas: The 12 Days of Devotion, November 2013 (with Lisa Bull)
- Postcards from Abby, August 2012 (with Ella Stewart)
