= Holly Bakke =

American attorney

Commissioner of the New Jersey Department of Banking and Insurance
- In office March 13, 2002 – March 1, 2005
- Appointed by: Jim McGreevey; Richard Codey
- Preceded by: Donald Bryan
- Succeeded by: Donald Bryan

Personal details
- Education: Drew University (BA); Stevens Institute of Technology (MBA); Seton Hall University School of Law (JD)

Holly Bakke is an American attorney who served as Commissioner of the New Jersey Department of Banking and Insurance from 2002 to 2005 in the administration of Governor James E. McGreevey. She received a Bachelor of Arts (BA) from Drew University, a Masters in Business Administration (MBA) from Stevens Institute of Technology, and a Juris Doctor (J.D.) from Seton Hall Law School. She also served as a trustee of New Jersey's Kean University. Following leaving her position as Commissioner, she began working with Strategic Initiatives Management Group, LLC as a principal.
