= Hilary Link =

American educator

Hilary L. Link is an American educator who started as president of Drew University on July 1, 2023. She was previously president of Allegheny College from 2019 to 2022, the first woman to hold that position.

== Education and career ==
Link graduated with a B.A. from Stanford University in 1991. She earned an M.A. and Ph.D. in Italian language and literature from Yale University. She began her career in higher education as director of scholar programs at New York University. She went on to become Vice Provost at Barnard College of Columbia University in 2012. Then in 2013 President Link served as dean of Temple University in Rome. In July 2019 President Link became the first woman to become president of Allegheny College in Meadville, PA. She served in this position until 2022. While at Allegheny College, Link was one of several people who added letters to a time capsule that will be opened in 2071.

=== President of Drew University ===
In February 2023, an announcement was made that Link would become the next president of Drew University. On July 1, 2023, Dr. Link became the 15th president of Drew University.

== Honors and awards ==
Dr. Link's achievements include membership in the Stanford University Associates in recognition of her service to Stanford University as well as academic recognitions including the Elizabeth Deering Hanscom Fellowship in the Humanities at Yale University and the Pi Mu Iota Award for highest achievement in the Italian Department at Stanford University. She was selected as a Presidential Fellow by the Association of International Education Administrators (AIEA) and received the Administrator of the Year Award from the Barnard College Student Government Association. Additionally, Dr. Link served as vice chair of the Board of Trustees for the American Overseas School of Rome and was a member of the Board of Directors for the Centro Studi Americani. Link was the 2021 recipient of the Pittsburgh Professional Women's Influential Leader Award.

Dr. Link serves on the Climate Leadership Steering Committee of the Presidents’ Climate Leadership Commitments, an oversight body for higher education institutions committed to addressing climate change and preparing students to address 21st-century challenges through research and education. She has also been appointed to a four-year term on the NCAA Honors Committee, where she participates in reviewing nominations and selecting recipients for national awards presented annually at the NCAA Convention. Additionally, Dr. Link is a member of The International Women's Forum, an invitation-only global network of senior women leaders dedicated to advancing women's leadership and championing equality worldwide.

== Personal life ==
Dr. Link is married and has three children.
