= James Fiorentino =

American painter

James Fiorentino is an American painter and illustrator who is known for his work in sports art and receiving celebrity autographs and endorsements. Fiorentino has been featured on ESPN First Take, The New York Times, MSG Network's New York Yankee Pregame Show, and other television broadcasts and magazines.

== Career ==
Fiorentino's work began to be displayed in museums and galleries when he was a teenager. He received a B.A. degree from Drew University in 1999. More recently Fiorentino was honored with an award at the Latino MVP Awards in 2011.
