= Fred Garrigus Holloway =

Fred Garrigus Holloway (1898 – June 1, 1988) was an American bishop of The Methodist Church, elected in 1960. He also served as president of Western Maryland College (1935-47) and Drew University (1948-60).

== Education ==
Holloway graduated in 1918 from Western Maryland College (now renamed McDaniel College), then earned a B.D. from Drew University in 1921.

Prior to his election to the Episcopacy, he was involved in education. He was Professor of Biblical Languages and President of Wesley Theological Seminary. He was also President (1935-47) of Western Maryland College, Westminster, Maryland.

He became Dean of the Drew Theological Seminary, Drew University, Madison, New Jersey in 1947. Just one year later he was offered the Presidency of the University upon the retirement of President Arlo Ayres Brown. As the seventh President of Drew from 1948-60, renovating and rebuilding the antiquated campus became his greatest legacy. New buildings, such as the Baldwin Gymnasium and many dormitories, were completed under his leadership. A graduate study curriculum was also instituted. Upon his election to the Episcopacy, Bishop Holloway left the university for his new role, and was assigned to West Virginia.

== Publications ==
- New Testament foundations for Christian evangelism (1965)

== Family ==
Holloway was married to Winifred Jackson in 1921.

== Legacy ==
McDaniel College hosts an annual Holloway Lecture in memory of Bishop Holloway.

== See also ==
- List of bishops of the United Methodist Church
