= Jeff Smith (chef) =

American chef and cookbook author

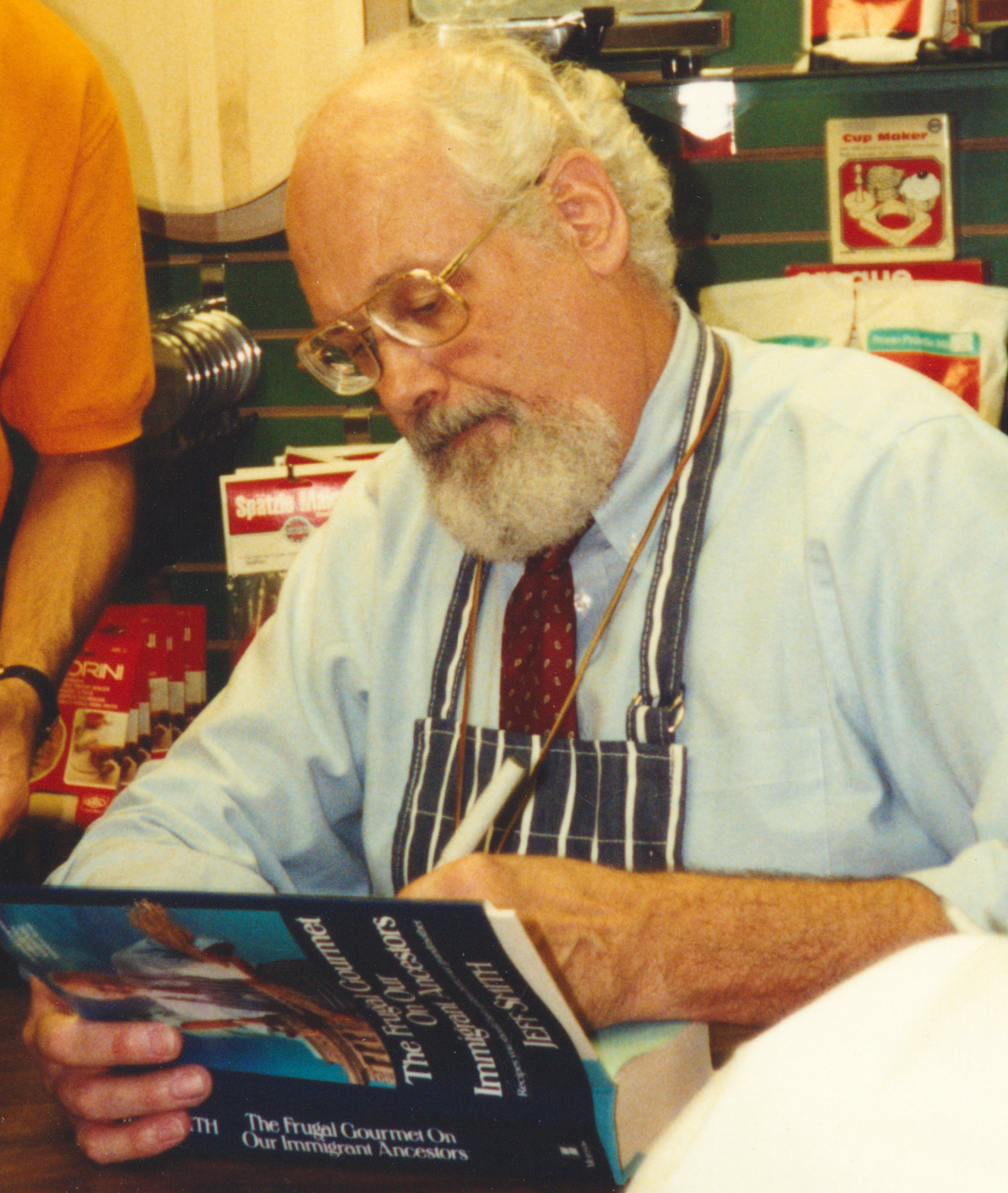
- Smith in 1990
- Born: January 22, 1939; Tacoma, Washington, US
- Died: July 7, 2004 (aged 65); Seattle, Washington, US
- Spouse: Patricia "Patty" Smith (m. 1966)
- Children: 2
- Culinary career
- Cooking style: Gourmet
- Previous restaurant
- Chaplain's Pantry (1972–1983)
- Television shows
- Cooking Fish Creatively (1973–1977); The Frugal Gourmet (1984–1997)

Jeffrey L. Smith (January 22, 1939 – July 7, 2004) was an American chef who was author of several cookbooks and host of The Frugal Gourmet, a popular cooking show. The show began in Tacoma, Washington, as Cooking Fish Creatively on local PBS station KTPS, where it aired from 1973 to 1977. It then moved to WTTW in Chicago, and finally to KQED in San Francisco, where it aired from 1984 to 1997. His career effectively ended with a series of sex abuse allegations made public in 1997.

== Biography ==
=== Early life ===
Smith was born in Tacoma, Washington, on January 22, 1939. He graduated from the University of Puget Sound (UPS) in 1962. In 1965, he graduated from Drew University in New Jersey, and he was ordained as a minister in the Methodist Church.

=== Career ===
==== Early career ====
From 1965 to 1972, Smith was a chaplain at the University of Puget Sound. At the university, he taught a course called Food as Sacrament and Celebration. In 1972, he left the university to open and run Chaplain's Pantry Restaurant and Gourmet Shop, a deli and kitchen supply store in Tacoma, where Smith and his students also offered cooking classes to the public.

==== Television ====
Smith began his television career in 1973 at KTPS in Tacoma on the show Cooking Fish Creatively, which ran from 1973 to 1977. It was then renamed The Frugal Gourmet. Smith's wife Patricia has been credited with originating the nickname "Frugal Gourmet". His popularity soared after an appearance on the national talk show, The Phil Donahue Show. In 1983, Smith moved to WTTW in Chicago, which began distributing the show nationally in 1984. In 1991, Smith moved The Frugal Gourmet to PBS station KQED in San Francisco. The show aired for 11 seasons, with a total of 261 episodes produced. The show was the most watched cooking show in the US. Its viewership in 1992 was 15 million viewers.

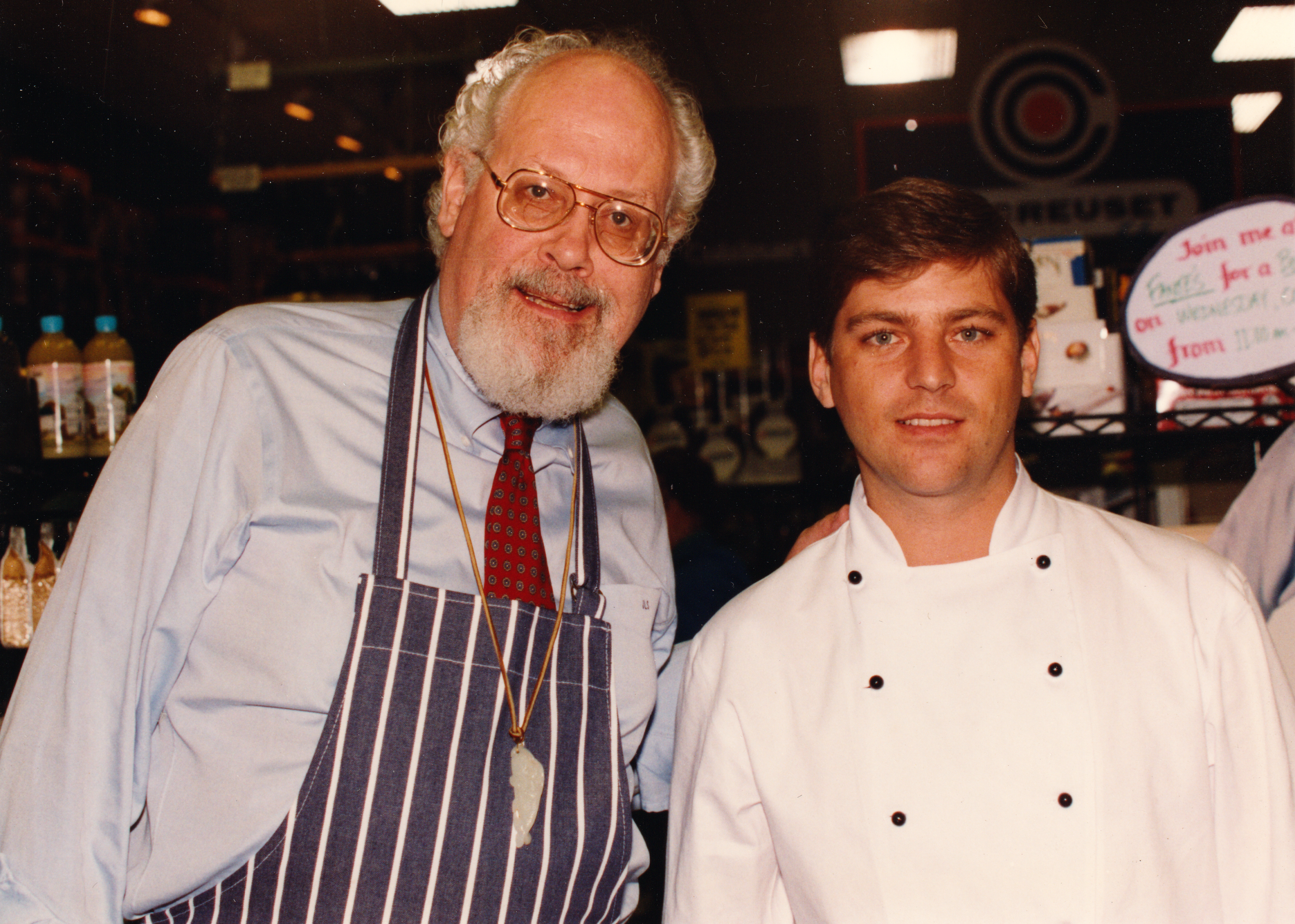
Smith with his long-time assistant and co-author Craig Wollam at Fante's Kitchen Shop (1992)

==== Author ====
Over the course of his career, Smith published numerous cookbooks, such as Recipes from the Frugal Gourmet (1977), The Frugal Gourmet (1984), The Frugal Gourmet Cooks With Wine (1986), The Frugal Gourmet Cooks American (1987), The Frugal Gourmet Cooks Three Ancient Cuisines (1989), The Frugal Gourmet on Our Immigrant Ancestors (1990), The Frugal Gourmet Celebrates Christmas (1991), The Frugal Gourmet's Culinary Handbook (1991), The Frugal Gourmet Whole Family Cookbook (1992), The Frugal Gourmet Cooks Italian (1993), and The Frugal Gourmet Keeps the Feast (1995). In 1992, his book sales were 5 million copies and at least one New York Times #1 Bestseller.

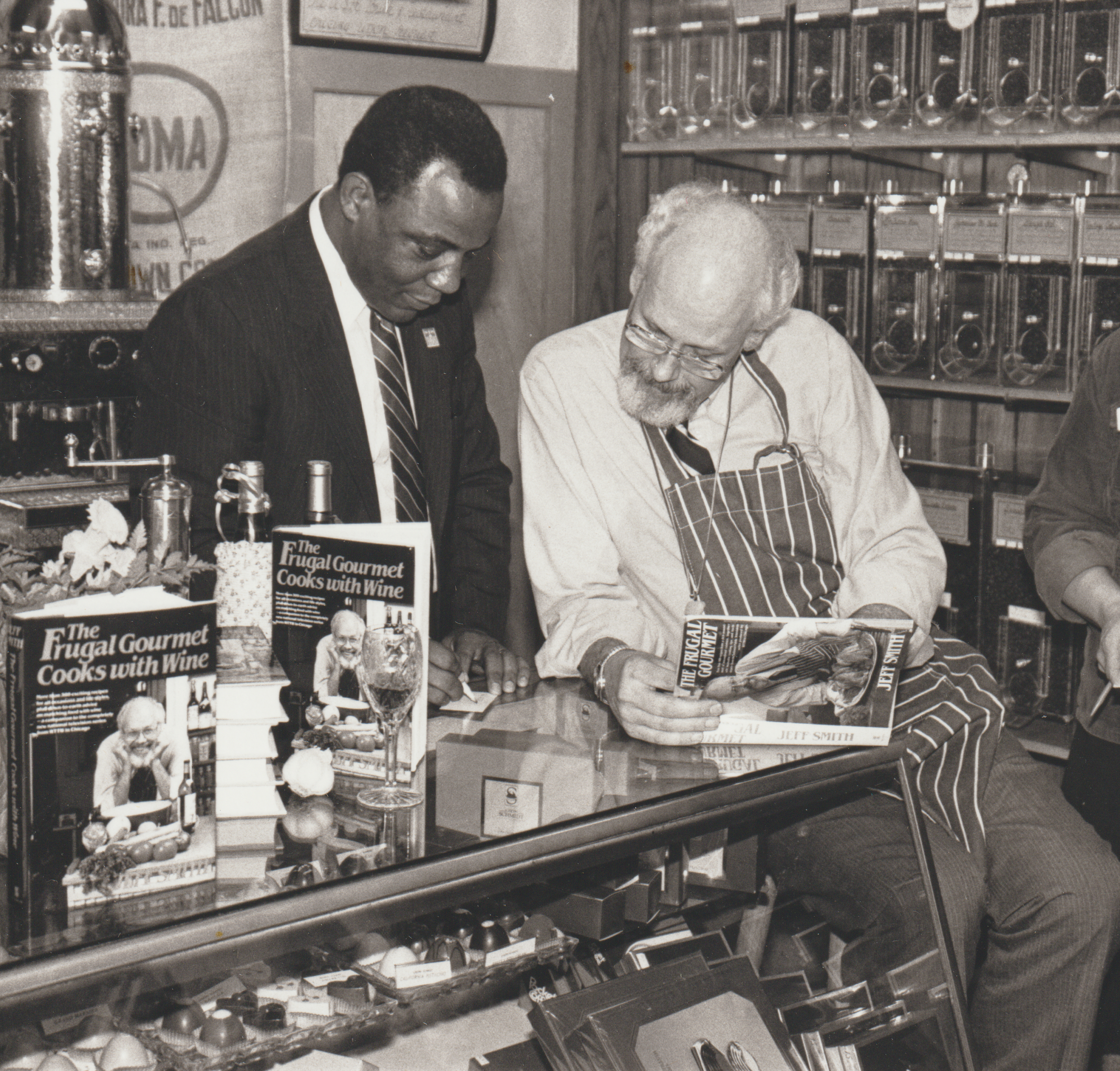
Philadelphia Mayor Wilson Goode with Smith in 1986

== Reputation ==
Smith was regarded as a "genius" by some and as a "tyrant" by others. Kathy Casey, a Seattle Times food columnist and longtime friend of Smith's, described him as a knowledgeable and generous man who "...knew more about food and culture than anybody I know in the food world." She said he donated both money and time to charitable causes and helped individuals get started in the food industry, even after his retirement.

Smith also had detractors. Irena Chalmers, a faculty member at the Culinary Institute of America and president of the International Association of Culinary Professionals, once described him as "the Frugal Gourmet, who is neither". Chicago Tribune food and wine columnist William Rice wrote, "I've tried to cook his stuff, and let's say it was hit or miss. Some things worked and others didn't." Newsweek writer Laura Shapiro criticized him as "a prime example of prominent cooks who may compromise their integrity by being paid to recommend food products and kitchen ware." She cited The Frugal Gourmet Whole Family Cookbook as "especially shocking", calling it "the cookbook as infomercial". In a 1992 Harper's Magazine article, Barbara Grizzuti Harrison ridiculed him as "a purveyor of patronizing poppycock ... conveyed with the kind of mock anger that is always a mask for real anger." Smith brushed aside such criticism: "Not many people read Harper's," he said. "That's a very small audience." He continued, "People criticize me for enjoying good food when I use the word frugal. Frugal doesn't mean cheap. It means you don't waste your money. They haven't read my books. They don't know the meaning of the word.

== Sexual abuse allegations ==
In 1997, seven men filed a civil lawsuit against Smith, charging him with sexual abuse. Six of them alleged that they were molested as teenagers in the 1970s while working at the Chaplain's Pantry in Tacoma; the seventh claimed that he was assaulted in 1992, at age 14, after Smith picked him up as a hitchhiker.

Smith denied the allegations, and no criminal charges were filed, but he and his insurers settled the cases for $5.5 million in 1998. The litigation ended his television career and his cookbook contracts were cancelled.

== Personal life and death ==
In 1966, Smith married Patricia "Patty" Smith, with whom he had two sons. Smith died in his sleep of heart disease on July 7, 2004, at age 65.

== Legacy ==
In 2026, a documentary series was released on Smith, titled I Bid You Peace: The Rise & Fall of the Frugal Gourmet, chronicling his life, career, and the sexual abuse allegations against him.

== Publications ==
- Recipes from the Frugal Gourmet (1977)
- The Frugal Gourmet (1984)
- The Frugal Gourmet Cooks with Wine (1986)
- The Frugal Gourmet Cooks American (1987)
- The Frugal Gourmet Cooks Three Ancient Cuisines: China, Greece, and Rome (1989)
- The Frugal Gourmet on Our Immigrant Ancestors: Recipes You Should Have Gotten from Your Grandmother (1990)
- The Frugal Gourmet Celebrates Christmas (1991)
- The Frugal Gourmet's Culinary Handbook: An Updated Version of an American Classic on Food and Cooking (1991)
- The Frugal Gourmet Whole Family Cookbook: Recipes and Reflections for Contemporary Living (1992)
- The Frugal Gourmet Cooks Italian: Recipes from the New and Old Worlds, Simplified for the American Kitchen (1993)
- The Frugal Gourmet Keeps the Feast: Past, Present, and Future (1995)
