= MaryAnn Baenninger =

American academic

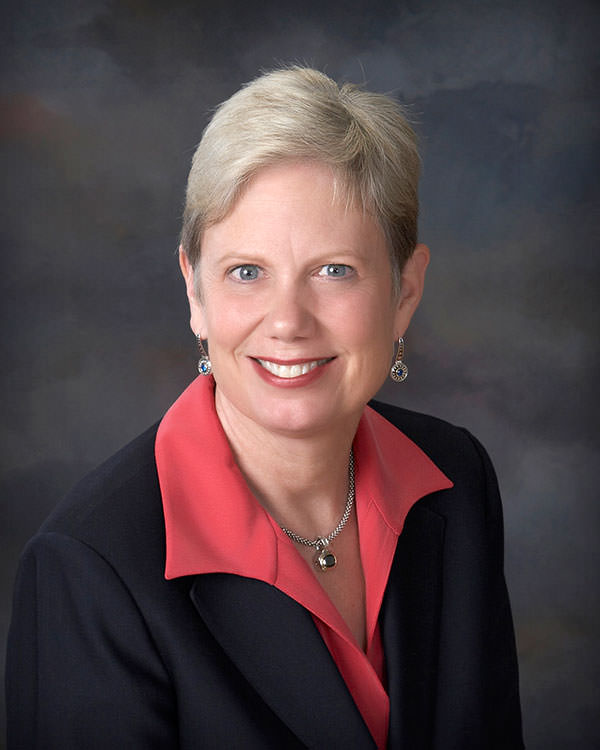

13th President of Drew University
- In office July 21, 2014 – July 31, 2020
- Preceded by: Vivian A. Bull
- Succeeded by: Thomas J. Schwarz (Interim)

Personal details
- Born: February 10, 1956 (age 70)
- Education: Temple University (B.A. & Ph.D.)
- Profession: Academic administrator

MaryAnn Baenninger is a psychology professor and the former president of Drew University, a Methodist-affiliated liberal arts college in Madison, New Jersey.

== Life ==
Baenninger received a Bachelor of Arts (B.A.) and Doctor of Philosophy (Ph.D.) in Psychology from Temple University in Philadelphia, Pennsylvania.

=== Career ===
Baenninger served as a psychology professor on the faculty of The College of New Jersey in Ewing, New Jersey, and as an executive associate director with the Middle States Commission on Higher Education in Philadelphia.

Baenninger was appointed as president of the College of Saint Benedict in Saint Joseph, Minnesota in 2004. During her tenure at the private Roman Catholic college for women, Baenninger was "credited with building out the school’s study abroad programs, attracting international students and supporting undergraduate research. She also won praise for diversifying the student body and more than doubling the school’s endowment."

=== Presient of Drew University ===
In February 2014, Drew University's board of trustees chose Baenninger as Drew's 13th president and first full-term female president. On May 18, 2020 the Drew Board of Trustees announced that by mutual decision Baenninger would step down as Drew president on July 31, 2020.

On July 14, 2020 the Drew Board of Trustees announced that Thomas J. Schwarz, president emeritus of SUNY Purchase, would succeed Baenninger on August 1, 2020 as interim president.

Baenninger serves as a commissioner on the Middle States Commission on Higher Education (MSCHE) and is the past chair and a member of the executive committee of the Council of Independent Colleges (CIC).

=== Personal life ===
Baenninger was married to the late Ronald Baenninger, a former Temple University psychology professor.

== Published writings ==
- Baenninger, MaryAnn, "Institutional Strength from CAO/CFO Partnerships", University Business Magazine, October 2009.
- Baenninger, MaryAnn, "A Golden Thread: The Liberal Arts in the 21st Century", CSB/SJU, 22 April 2005.
- Baenninger, MaryAnn, "For Women on Campuses, Access Doesn't Equal Success", The Chronicle of Higher Education, 2 October 2011.
