= Ezra Squier Tipple =

Ezra Squier Tipple (1861–1936) was the fifth president of Drew Theological Seminary from 1912 to 1929.

== Biography ==
He was born in 1861 and had a brother, Bertrand Martin Tipple. He received a Bachelor of Divinity degree from Drew Theological Seminary in 1887. Tipple died of pneumonia on October 17, 1936.
