= Drew University =

Private university in Madison, New Jersey, US

Coordinates: 40.761°N 74.427°W

- Former name: Drew Theological Seminary (1867–1928)
- Motto: δωρεὰν ἐλάβετε, δωρεὰν δότε (Greek)
- Motto in English: "Freely ye have received, freely give." (from Matthew 10:8 KJV)
- Type: Private liberal arts university
- Established: 1867; 159 years ago
- Religious affiliation: United Methodist Church
- Academic affiliations: Annapolis Group
- Endowment: $183.1 million (2019)
- President: Hilary L. Link
- Students: 2,269
- Undergraduates: 1,671
- Postgraduates: 598
- Location: Madison, New Jersey, U.S.
- Campus: Wooded; suburban
- Colors: Blue and green
- Nickname: Rangers
- Sporting affiliations: NCAA Division III, ECAC, Landmark Conference, IHSA
- Website: drew.edu

Drew University is a private liberal arts university in Madison, New Jersey, United States. Formed in 1867, the University consists of the College of Liberal Arts, the Caspersen School of Graduate Studies, and the Drew Theological School. The University is affiliated with the United Methodist Church.

== History ==
=== 19th century ===
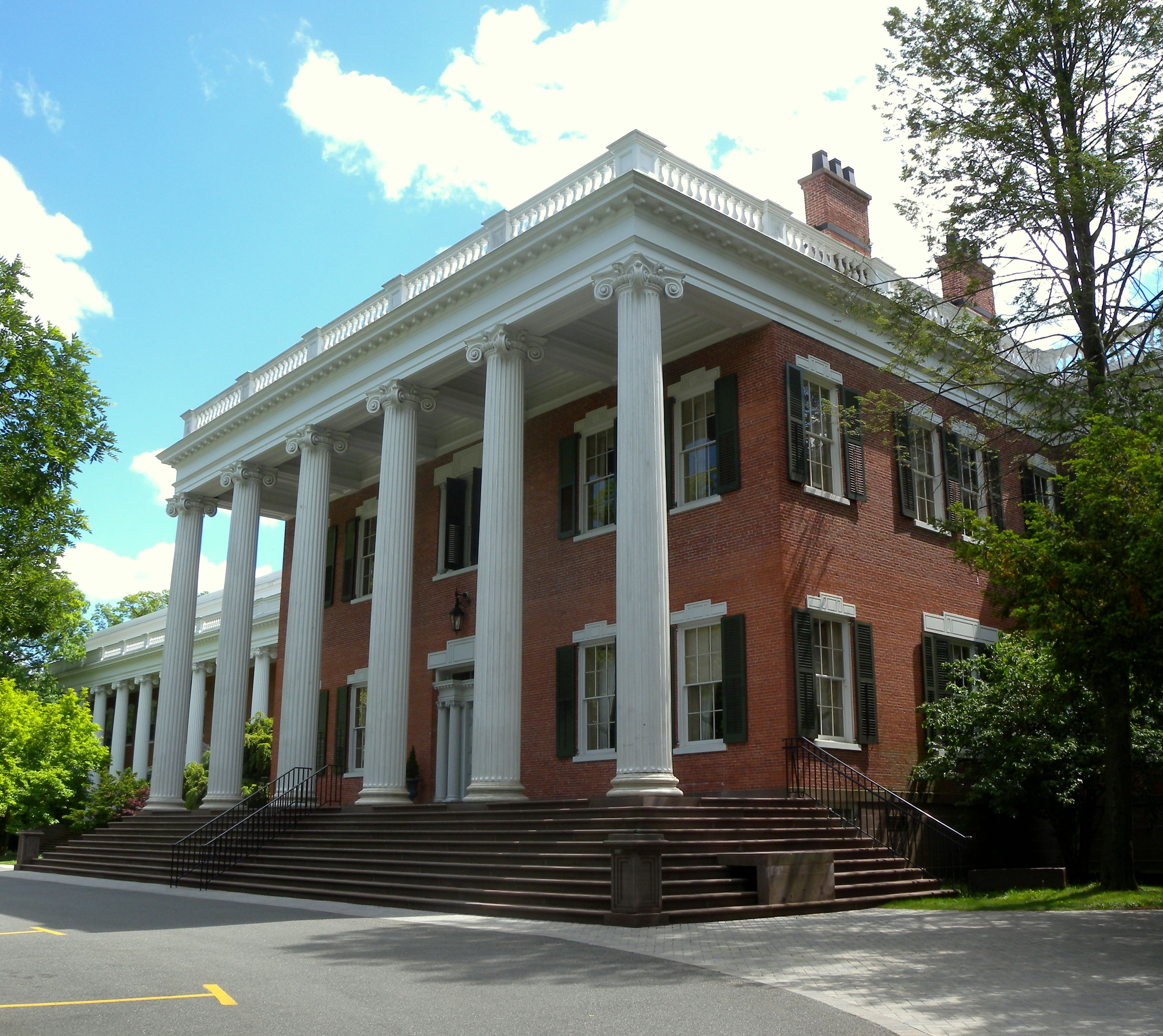
Mead Hall was purchased by Daniel Drew in 1867, who donated it to start a Methodist theological seminary.

In 1866, railroad "robber baron" Daniel Drew approached church leaders during the Methodist Centenary Celebration with an offer to build, equip, and endow a theological seminary near New York City. Drew asked that his pastor, John McClintock, be appointed the seminary's first president. Instruction began under McClintock's direction as both president and professor of practical theology after the first students were admitted in 1867. Drew is the third-oldest of 13 Methodist seminaries affiliated with the United Methodist Church.

Drew offered professional training for candidates to the ministry augmented by "an opportunity for a broad culture through the study of the humanities".

The seminary attracted a faculty that made influential contributions to Methodist theology and biblical scholarship, including James Strong, a professor of exegetical theology, who collaborated with McClintock on the ten-volume Cyclopaedia of Biblical, Theological, and Ecclesiastical Literature (1867–1881), and researched, compiled, and published Strong's Exhaustive Concordance of the Bible (1890) during his tenure at the seminary. Writings on early church theology and Christian practice were translated into Chinese for use by foreign missions.

=== 20th century ===
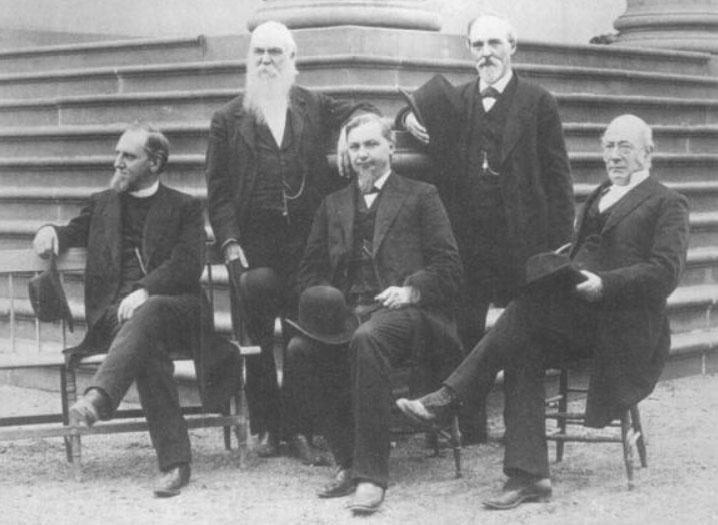
The faculty of Drew Theological Seminary, c. 1880–1890

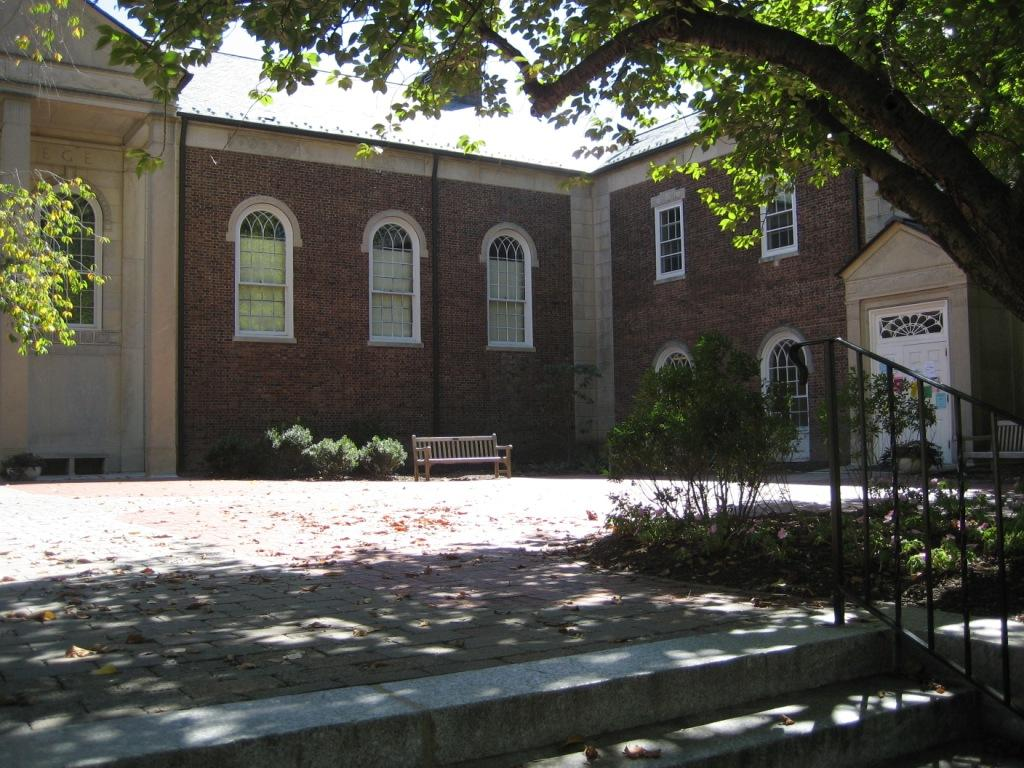
The courtyard of Brothers College, built in 1928

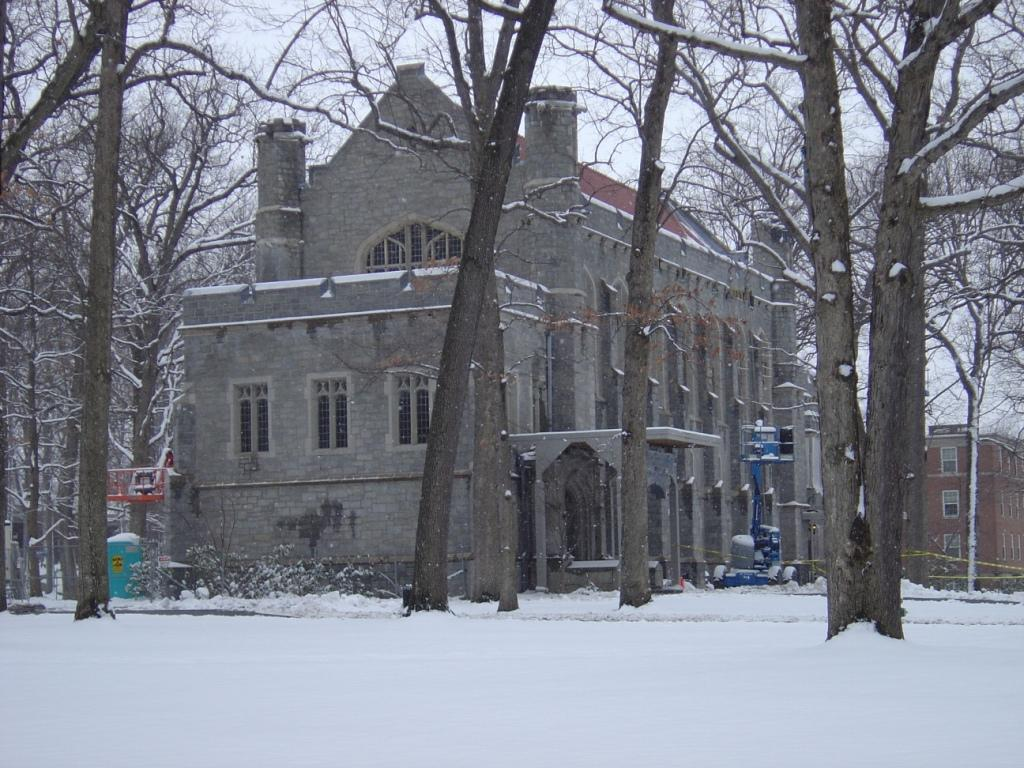
Samuel W. Bowne Hall

Throughout the 19th and early 20th centuries, Drew Theological Seminary educated and trained hundreds of Methodist ministers. It began to expand its role with the addition of a course of study for women in 1920 when it established a "College of Missions". This course was renamed the "College of Religious Education and Missions" in 1929 but was short-lived.

In 1928, Drew Theological Seminary accepted a gift of $1.5 million from brothers Arthur J. Baldwin and Leonard D. Baldwin to establish an undergraduate liberal arts college.

The Baldwins were successful attorneys who were raised on a farm in Cortland, New York. Both attended Cornell University. They established a law firm with former New Jersey governor John Griggs spanning "varied interests in lumbering, manufacturing, transportation, and other enterprises that ranged from owning the Grosvenor Hotel in New York City to Arthur's legal counseling for the rising McGraw-Hill publishing empire." The Baldwins became acquainted with the seminary's president, Ezra Squier Tipple, who "welcomed the brothers to his prominent New York City Methodist Church when they came to Manhattan." Leonard Baldwin became a trustee of the seminary in 1919. The donation originally consisted of $500,000 to build a college building, and $1,000,000 in the form of Great Atlantic & Pacific Tea Company (A&P) stock. The Baldwins exchanged the stock for a cash gift in 1928.

In their modesty and in recognition of their sibling affection, the Baldwins asked that it be named "Brothers College." The theological seminary then changed its name to "Drew University" to reflect its expanded role. Brothers College, later renamed the "College of Liberal Arts", opened in 1928 with its first class of 12 students. Brothers College incorporated the women's program and became coeducational in 1942, when school officials recognized that the military draft and war effort would reduce the all-male student body. Drew offered admission to United States Navy personnel through the V-12 Navy College Training Program. It was one of 131 U.S. colleges and universities to take part in the program, which offered students a path to a naval officer's commission.

In 1912, Drew began offering graduate-level education. It expanded its graduate education programs, focusing on religious studies and establishing the Graduate School, a third of Drew's degree-granting entities, in 1955, under the leadership of the university's seventh president, Fred Holloway. Holloway also delivered on goals set during previous administrations, overseeing the renovation and rebuilding of the campus, including the Baldwin Gymnasium and several dormitories. Four years later, it expanded the curriculum into other areas of the humanities. The Graduate School was renamed the "Caspersen School of Graduate Studies" after a pledge of $5,000,000 in 1999 by financier Finn M. W. Caspersen and his wife (and Drew alumna) Barbara Morris Caspersen.

With financial assistance from the Mellon Foundation, during the 1970s the college established a freshman seminar program that allows first-year students to participate, with faculty who also serve as their academic advisers, in intensive study of a topic of hopefully mutual interest.

In 1984, psychology professors Philip Jensen and Richard Detweiler led an effort to provide a personal computer and application software to all incoming freshman, a program called the Computer Initiative. Drew was the first liberal arts college to have such a requirement. The Computer Initiative differentiated Drew from other liberal arts colleges, and continued until 2012, by which time most entering students had their own computers or wished to select their own model.

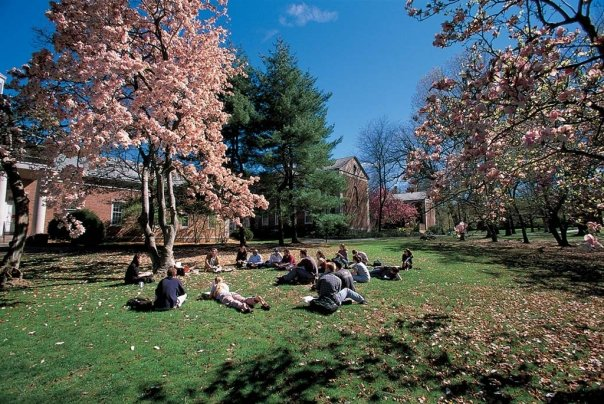
A Drew University class session held outdoors

After serving two terms as New Jersey's 48th governor, Thomas Kean was appointed Drew's tenth president in 1990. He served for 15 years before retiring in 2005.

=== 21st century ===
After Kean retired, the trustees selected Robert Weisbuch, former president of the Woodrow Wilson National Fellowship Foundation, as Drew's 11th president. He served for seven years and stepped down in June 2012. Under Weisbuch's direction, Drew became SAT-optional. From 2006 to 2013, applicants were allowed to submit a graded high school essay instead of SAT or ACT scores.

In 2013, the university reinstated the SAT (or ACT) as an admission requirement, and changed course two years later in 2015, making it optional once again.

MaryAnn Baenninger became the president of Drew University in July 2014 after serving 10 years as the president of the College of Saint Benedict. She succeeded Vivian A. Bull, a former economics professor and associate dean of the college at Drew and former president of Linfield College, who served as Drew's interim president from 2012 to 2014.

In 2015, the Nobel Prize in Physiology or Medicine was shared by William Campbell, a research fellow at Drew University, for his work developing a drug that treats parasitic diseases.

In September 2017, Drew announced that it was cutting the list price of its tuition for the 2018–19 school year by 20%, from $48,300 to $36,600, as part of an effort to make the school more appealing to prospective students who had been deterred by the sticker price, which had been one of the state's highest.

In May 2020, the university's board of trustees announced that Baenninger would step down at the conclusion of her contract on July 31, 2020. In July, the school's search committee announced the appointment of Thomas J. Schwarz as interim president, beginning on August 1. On February 8, 2023, Drew announced the appointment of its 15th president, Hilary L. Link, former president of Allegheny College.

On January 12, 2026 the university announced the sale of Drew Forest, Zuck Arboretum, and Madison House to the Borough of Madison. Additionally, other lands adjacent to the main thoroughfare running along the campus, Madison Avenue, have been reserved for development by private contractors.

In August of 2026, the university announcemed they would be opening The Drew School, an AI-based 1-8th grade school on campus in partnership with 2 HR Learning, whose software powers the Alpha School chain.

== Campus ==
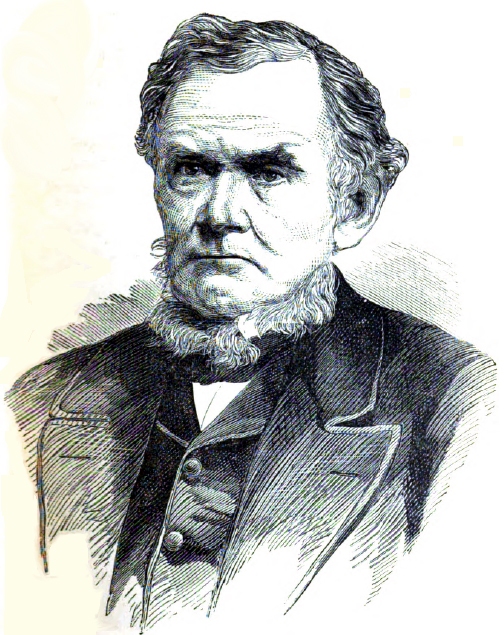
Daniel Drew, the financier and railroad tycoon whose donations established Drew Theological Seminary, later named Drew University

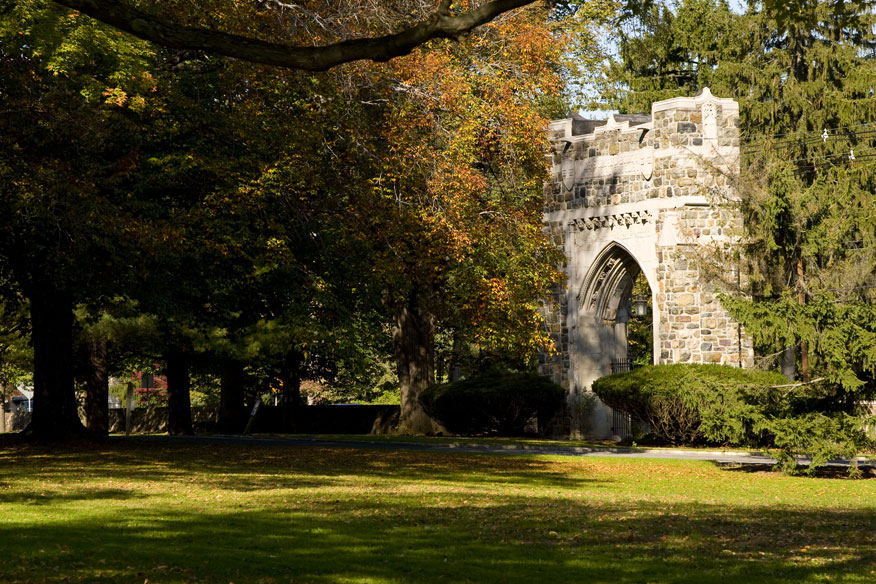
The Bowne Memorial Gateway

Drew University is in Madison, New Jersey, a borough about 25 miles (40 km) west of New York City. Known as "the Rose City" because of its rose-cultivating industry in the 19th century, Madison is an affluent commuter town in Morris County. It is connected to the state's northern section and Midtown Manhattan by NJ Transit's Morris & Essex Lines. The university hosts the Shakespeare Theatre of New Jersey, an independent professional theatre company.

The university sits on the former estate of William Gibbons, who owned the New York–New Jersey steamboat business that became famous from the Gibbons v. Ogden case, (Note: William was the son and heir of Thomas Gibbons, appellant in Gibbons v. Ogden, 22 U.S. (9 Wheat) 1, 16 L.Ed. 23 (1824).) and who pieced together a 95-acre (38 ha) estate in Madison in 1832. He named his holdings "The Forest", from which Drew got its nickname the "University in the Forest".

The following year, Gibbons commissioned the design and construction of a Greek Revival antebellum-style residence that was completed in 1836.

In 1867, financier and railroad tycoon Daniel Drew purchased Gibbons's estate from his descendants for $140,000. A devout Methodist, Drew donated the estate to the church to establish a Methodist theological seminary. The estate's mansion was renamed Mead Hall in honor of Drew's wife, Roxanna Mead.

Drew's academic buildings feature a mix of Greek Revival, Collegiate Gothic, and neoclassical architecture on a wooded campus in the middle of a bustling suburban town.

=== In popular culture ===
In films, the Drew University campus appears in So Fine (1981), Deconstructing Harry (1997), The Family Stone (2005), Spinning into Butter (2008), The Incredible Hulk (2008), and Insidious: The Red Door (2023).

In television, Drew University features prominently in Season 1, Episode 5 of The Sopranos, "College", which initially aired on February 7, 1999. In the episode, Drew's Mead Hall appears, substituting for Bates College, Colby College, and Bowdoin College. In an episode of the NBC series "Friday Night Lights" that aired on November 19, 2008, several Drew campus locations appear, including Asbury Hall and S.W. Bowne Hall.

== Academics ==
=== Undergraduate admissions ===
In 2024, Drew University accepted 72.7% of applicants, with those admitted having an average 3.1 GPA. Drew is a test-optional school and those submitting test scores had an average 1230 SAT score (32% submitting scores) or average 27 ACT score (4% submitting scores).

=== Rankings ===
In 2026, U.S. News & World Report ranked Drew University tied for 84th out of 207 National Liberal Arts Colleges and 7th in Top Performers on Social Mobility. For 2025, Washington Monthly ranked Drew 62nd among 190 U.S. liberal arts colleges based on its contribution to the public good, as measured by social mobility, research, and promoting public service.

=== Accreditation and affiliations ===
Drew University is accredited by the Middle States Commission on Higher Education. It was first accredited in 1932. Since 1938, the theological seminary at Drew has been accredited by the Association of Theological Schools in the United States and Canada. Drew's MAT program is accredited by the Council for Accreditation of Educator Preparation.

All the university's programs are approved and accredited by the General Board of Higher Education and Ministry and the University Senate of the United Methodist Church. Drew is one of 119 institutions that are members of the National Association of Schools and Colleges of The United Methodist Church (NASCUMC).

=== Undergraduate programs ===
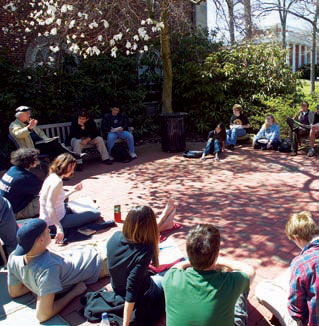
Students at Drew University in August 2008

The Princeton Review has consistently ranked Drew as having a top 20 theatre program in the United States since 2011. Its most popular undergraduate majors, based on 2021 graduates, were:

- Business Administration and Management (43)
- Psychology (37)
- Biology/Biological Sciences (36)
- Communication and Media Studies (26)
- Economics (23)
- Fine/Studio Arts (21)
- Computer Science (21)

=== Graduate programs ===
Graduate education has taken place at Drew University since 1912. Initially, graduate education was limited to theology and was conducted through the Theological School. In 1955, the Graduate School was established to take responsibility for the academic (i.e., non-ministerial) study of religion at the graduate level and allow for the development of new graduate programs. In 1999, in exchange for a private donation made by Barbara and Finn Caspersen, the school was renamed the Caspersen School of Graduate Studies.

=== Theological degree programs ===
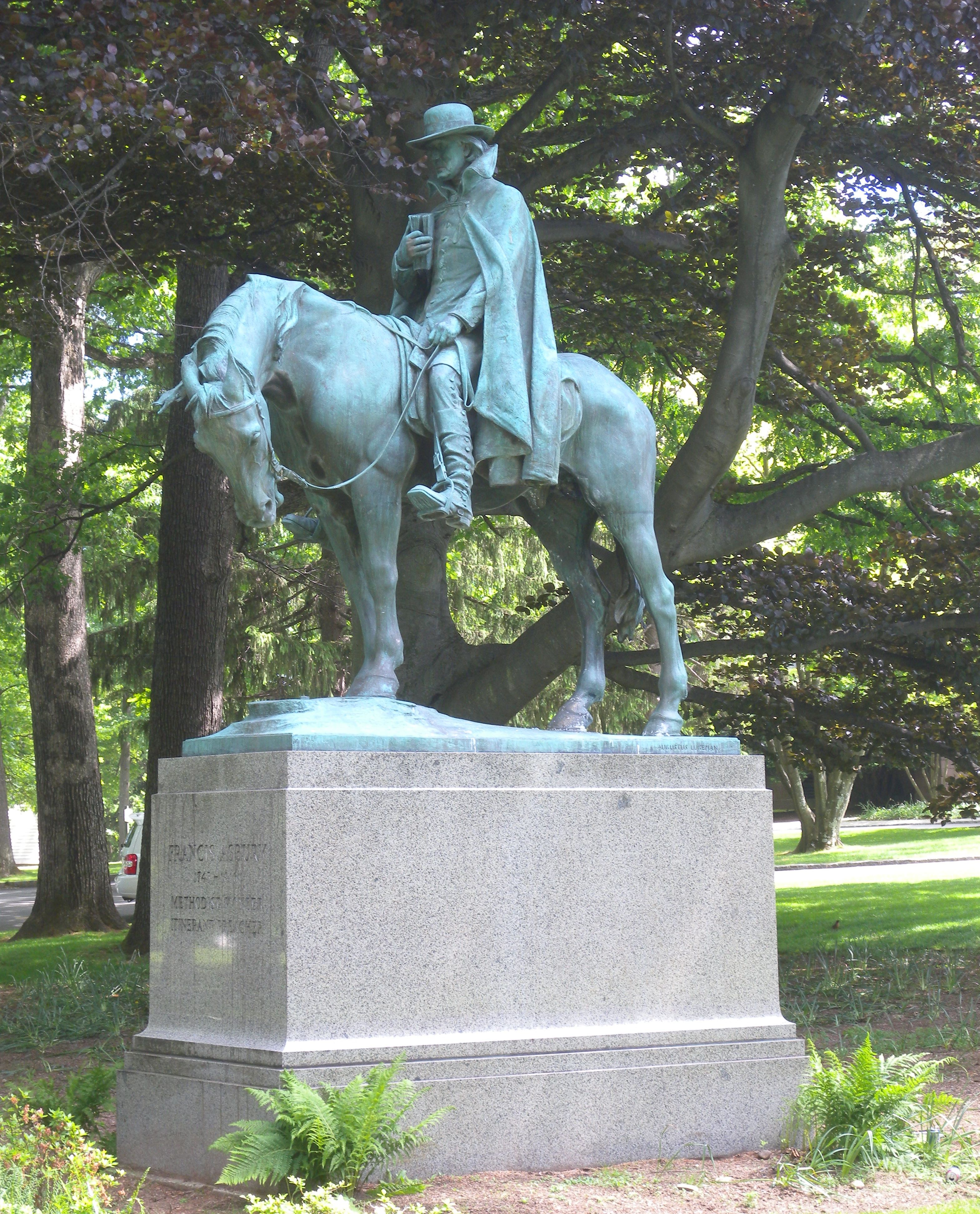
A statue of Francis Asbury, one of the first two Methodist bishops whose travels spread Methodism across the United States and launched the Second Great Awakening

Drew Theological School admitted its first students in 1867. Until the 1950s, the school was known as the Drew Theological Seminary, and most students sought a Bachelor of Divinity (B.Div.) degree, which was considered the standard for becoming a minister in an established church. Occasionally, the seminary did issue other degrees, such a Master of Arts (MA) or a Doctor of Theology (Th.D.) to students engaged in the graduate study of religion. Starting in 1920 women were admitted as students, and most notably Olive Winchester was issued a Doctor of Theology in 1925, and became the first female ordained minister in Great Britain.

=== Rose Memorial Library and Methodist Archives ===
Built in 1938 with funds donated by Lenox S. Rose, the Rose Memorial Library houses the university's library collections offering 558,000 bound volumes, more than 378,000 microforms, 10,000 periodical titles in electronic database subscriptions, and about 2,700 periodical subscriptions in paper form. The facility also includes a media resource center and learning center. The library has been designated a selective depository for U.S. government publications in accordance with the Federal Depository Library Program. Drew also maintains collections of official documents from the United Nations and the state of New Jersey. There are over 400,000 documents in the collection.

Drew University houses the United Methodist Archives and History Center administered by the United Methodist Commission on Archives and History. This collection is among the most comprehensive collections of Methodist books, documents and artifacts in the world offering insight into eighteenth- and nineteenth-century English and American religious and cultural history.

Special Collections at Drew University cover a wide range of materials from the 11th century to the present. Topics include religious materials such as hymnbooks, prayer books, and Bibles, as well as non-religious materials such as witchcraft, literature, graphic novels, and science fiction magazines. Most notably, the collection holds a first edition of the King James Bible.

The library's special collections include a collection of books, manuscripts, artifacts and papers of Nebraska-born author Willa Cather (1873–1947). This collection, which is regarded as the best collection of Cather's papers assembled in the United States, was given to the university by several donors, including Frederick B. Adams, former director of the Pierpont Morgan Library; Earl and Achsah Brewster, longtime friends of Cather; violinist Yehudi Menuhin; and by Finn and Barbara Caspersen.

== Athletics ==
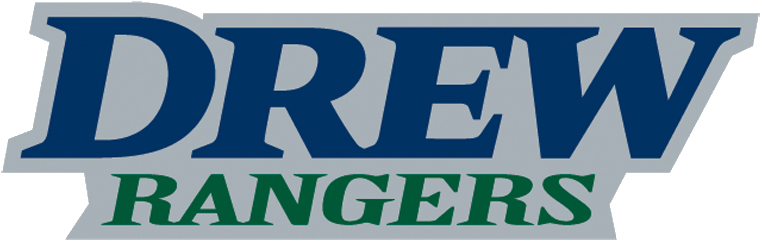
Drew Rangers wordmark

Originally known as "The Circuit Riders" in honor of their Methodist origins, Drew's sports teams are known as the Rangers and compete in NCAA Division III. The Rangers field 20 teams (11 female, 9 male) in 12 varsity sports. Drew is a member of the Landmark Conference for men's and women's basketball, cross country, golf, lacrosse, soccer, swimming and diving, tennis, baseball, field hockey, and softball. The Rangers compete as an independent in men's and women's fencing, which compete in the Mid-Atlantic Collegiate Fencing Association (MACFA), the National Intercollegiate Women's Fencing Association (NIWFA) and the Eastern Women's Fencing Conference (EWFC), and co-ed equestrian, which competes in the Intercollegiate Horse Show Association (IHSA). Drew offers many club teams including ultimate frisbee and Drew's women's and men's rugby teams, which are part of the collegiate division of the Empire Geographical Union. Drew has several intramural sports programs.

Sport	Men or Women
Baseball	Men
Basketball	Both
Cross Country	Both
Equestrian	Women
Fencing	Both
Field Hockey	Women
Golf	Both
Lacrosse	Both
Soccer	Both
Softball	Women
Track and Field	Both
Tennis	Both
Volleyball (2022)	Both

== Notable people ==
In the university's 146-year history, Drew's faculty and alumni have taken leading roles in the ministry and missions of the United Methodist Church and other Christian denominations, in spiritual instruction, in academia, in public service, and in the professional world. Drew's faculty, starting with John McClintock and James Strong—especially with his magnum opus, Strong's Concordance—to recent faculty members including philosopher Robert S. Corrington, the founder of "ecstatic naturalism"; ethics professor Thomas C. Oden, the founder of paleo-orthodoxy, and Leonard Sweet, a leader in the emerging church movement, have continued to impact Christian theology and spiritual scholarship. Other faculty have included lexicographer Robert L. Chapman, editor of the fourth and fifth editions of Roget's Thesaurus; Ira Progoff, a psychotherapist, developed the Intensive Journal Method, and researcher of depth psychology; and Irish history scholar Christine Kinealy. William Campbell, research fellow in Drew's RISE institute, was awarded the 2015 Nobel Prize in Physiology or Medicine.

According to the UMC, Drew's seminary now has more than 3,500 alumni and alumnae "in 45 states and 18 foreign countries, including 21 bishops of The United Methodist Church." Among these alumni: Henry G. Appenzeller (BD 1885) was the first Methodist missionary to Korea and fostered a relationship between Korea, the church, and Drew that endures to this day, Peter Deunov (1892), Bulgarian philosopher and spiritual teacher, and Olive Winchester (Th.D. 1925), a Church of the Nazarene theologian, was the first female ordained minister in Great Britain. Frederick Brown Harris (1912) was twice the Chaplain of the United States Senate.

Alumni include historian and journalist John T. Cunningham (BA 1938); Craig Stanford (BA 1978), a biology and anthropology professor and director of the Jane Goodall Research Center at the University of Southern California; and Jeff Smith (M.Div. 1965), minister, cookbook author, host of The Frugal Gourmet a television program that aired from 1973 to 1997. Several Drew alumni have had careers in public service, including Nathaniel Raymond (BA 1999), human rights advocate involved in investigations into the Dasht-i-Leili massacre; Holly Bakke (BA 1973), an attorney who served as New Jersey Commissioner of Banking and Insurance (2002–2005); Peter Verniero (BA 1981), a former New Jersey Attorney General and New Jersey Supreme Court justice; and Thomas J. Aquilino (BA 1962), a federal judge on the United States Court of International Trade.

== See also ==
- Lectionary 301
- List of botanical gardens in the United States
- List of colleges and universities in New Jersey
