= List of American Whig–Cliosophic Society members =

The Cliosophic Society, 1889

The American Whig–Cliosophic Society, is a political, literary, and debating society at Princeton University. It is the oldest debate union in the United States. Following is a list of some of the notable members of the American Whig–Cliosophic Society

== Academia ==
Name	Affiliation	Notability	References
Jeremiah Day	Clio (honorary), inducted 1817	President of Yale University	
Samuel Eusebius McCorkle	Clio, class of 1772	Presbyterian preacher, teacher, and the interceptor and progenitor of the University of North Carolina at Chapel Hill,	
Eliphalet Nott	Clio (honorary), inducted in 1816	President of Union College	
Joseph S. Nye, Jr.	Whig–Cliosophic, class of 1958	Dean of the John F. Kennedy School of Government at Harvard University, Assistant Secretary of Defense for International Security Affairs, chair of the National Intelligence Council	
John Rawls	Whig–Cliosophic, class of 1943	professor of philosophy at Harvard University	
Tapping Reeve	Clio (founder), Class of 1763	Founder of the first law school in the United States	
Samuel Stanhope Smith	Whig (founder), class of 1769	President of Princeton University	

== Law ==
Name	Affiliation	Notability	References
Samuel Alito	Whig–Cliosophic, Class of 1972	Supreme Court of the United States associate justice	
Hugh Henry Brackenridge	Whig (founder), Class of 1771	Supreme Court of Pennsylvania justice; coauthored the first American novel	
William Bradford	Whig (founder), Class of 1772	United States Attorney General; argued the first recorded case before the Supreme Court of the United States	
Oliver Ellsworth	Clio (founder), Class of 1766	Chief Justice of the United States, Founding Father, drafter of the Constitution of the United States, drafter of the Judiciary Act of 1789	
Henry Brockholst Livingston	Whig, Class of 1774	Supreme Court of the United States associate justice	
William Paterson	Clio (founder), Class of 1763	Supreme Court of the United States associate justice, Governor of New Jersey, Founding Father, and signer of the Constitution of the United States	
William Wirt	Clio (honorary), inducted 1819	United States Attorney General	

== Literature and journalism ==
Name	Affiliation	Notability	References
F. Scott Fitzgerald	Whig, Class of 1917	Author	
Philip Freneau	Whig (founder), Class of 1771	Co-authored the first American novel; the Poet of the American Revolution	
Ramesh Ponnuru	Whig–Cliosophic, Class of 1995	Senior editor for the National Review	
Booth Tarkington	Whig–Cliosophic, Class of 1893	Novelist and winner of the Pulitzer Prize for Fiction	
Mark Twain	Clio (honorary), inducted 1901	author and humorist	
Stan Lee	Clio (honorary)	comic book writer and editor	

== Politics ==
Name	Affiliation	Notability	References
John Beatty	Whig (founder), class of 1769	Speaker of the New Jersey General Assembly	
James Buchanan	Whig (honorary), inducted 1820	President of the United States, United States Senate, and United States Secretary of State	
Aaron Burr	Clio (founder), Class of 1772	Vice-President of the United States, Founding Father, United States Senate, and Attorney General of New York	
Ted Cruz	Clio, Class of 1992	United States Senate	
George M. Dallas	Clio, Class of 1810	Vice-President of the United States, United States Senate	
Mitch Daniels	Whig–Cliosophic, Class of 1971	Governor of Indiana	
Allen Welsh Dulles	Whig, Class of 1914	Director of the Council on Foreign Relations, Director of Central Intelligence, and member of the Warren Commission	
John Foster Dulles	Whig, Class of 1908	United States Secretary of State	
Edward Everett	Clio (honorary), inducted 1836	Governor of Massachusetts, United States Secretary of State, United States House of Representatives, United States Senate, and U.S. Minister to Great Britain	
John Henry	Whig (founder), class of 1769	Governor of Maryland and United States Senate	
Andrew Jackson	Whig (honorary), inducted 1838	President of the United States	
Thomas Kean	Clio, Class of 1957	Governor of New Jersey, Speaker of the New Jersey General Assembly, and chair of the 9/11 Commission	
Light-Horse Harry Lee	Whig (originally Clio), Class of 1773	Governor of Virginia	
James Madison	Whig (founder), Class of 1771	President of the United States, Father of the Constitution of the United States, co-Father of its United States Bill of Rights, Founding Father, and co-author of The Federalist Papers	
Luther Martin	Clio (founder), Class of 1766	Founding Father and delegate to the Constitutional Convention	
James Monroe	Clio (honorary), inducted 1817	President of the United States, Founding Father, United States Secretary of State, and United States Secretary of War	
Ralph Nader	unknown, Class of 1955	Political activist involved in consumer protection, environmentalism, and government reform causes; presidential candidate	
Aaron Ogden	Clio, Class of 1773	Governor of New Jersey and United States Senate	
William Paterson	Clio (founder), Class of 1763	Governor of New Jersey, Supreme Court of the United States associate justice, Founding Father, and signer of the Constitution of the United States	
Claiborne Pell	Whig, class of 1940	United States Senate	
Paul S. Sarbanes	Whig–Cliosophic, Class of 1954	United States Senate	
Adlai Stevenson II	Whig, Class of 1922	Governor of Illinois and U.S. Ambassador to the United Nations	
Norman M. Thomas	Whig, Class of 1905	Six-time presidential candidate for the Socialist Party of America	
Woodrow Wilson	Whig, Class of 1879 Speaker (president)	President of the United States, Governor of New Jersey, and president of Princeton University	
Charles W. Yost	Whig, Class of 1928	U.S Ambassador to Laos, U.S. Ambassador to Syria, U.S. Ambassador to Morocco, and U.S. Ambassador to the United Nations	

== See also ==
- American Whig–Cliosophic Society
