= Drumthwacket =

Historic house in New Jersey

- U.S. National Register of Historic Places
- New Jersey Register of Historic Places
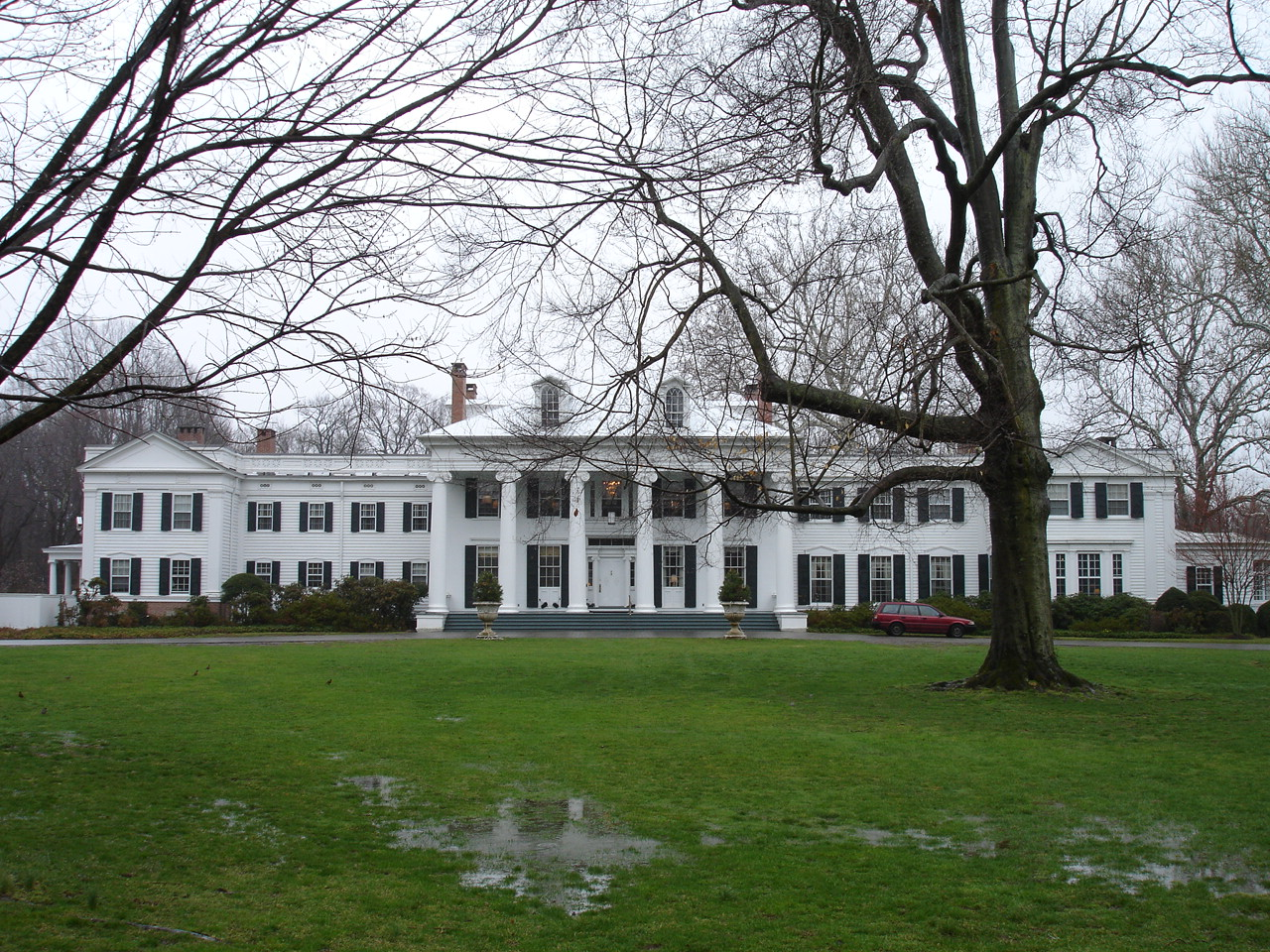

- Location within Mercer County, New Jersey Location within New Jersey Location within the United States
- Interactive map showing the location of Drumthwacket
- Location: 354 Stockton Street; Princeton, New Jersey 08540
- Coordinates: 40°20′21″N 74°40′29″W
- Built: 1835
- Architectural style: Greek Revival; Colonial Georgian
- NRHP reference No.: 75001142
- NJRHP No.: 1744

Significant dates
- Added to NRHP: June 10, 1975
- Designated NJRHP: May 8, 1975

Drumthwacket (/ˈdrʌmˌθwækɪt/ DRUM-thwak-it) is the official residence of the governor of the U.S. state of New Jersey at 354 Stockton Street in Princeton, New Jersey, near the state capital of Trenton.

The mansion was built in 1835 and expanded in 1893 and 1900. It was sold, along with its surrounding land, to the state in 1966. Drumthwacket was added to the National Register of Historic Places on June 10, 1975 for its significance in agriculture, architecture, commerce, landscape architecture, and politics. It was designated the governor's mansion in 1982.

The estate is administered by the New Jersey Department of Environmental Protection. It serves as the executive residence and is also a historic house museum.

== History ==
Drumthwacket sits on land that was once owned by William Penn, the Quaker proprietor of the Province of Pennsylvania and founder of Philadelphia. In 1695, William Olden bought the land and built a small white homestead which he named Olden House.

In 1799, Charles Smith Olden was born there. Olden gained wealth working at a mercantile firm in Philadelphia and later New Orleans before returning to Princeton. It wasn't until 1835, that construction was begun on the Drumthwacket house. The name probably comes from Sir Walter Scott's 1819 novel A Legend of Montrose, whose comic character Dugald Dalgetty is laird of Drumthwacket. Modern sources say Drumthwacket derives from two Scottish Gaelic words meaning "wooded hill". Olden began his involvement in politics as a gentleman farmer and businessman, as treasurer and Trustee of the College of New Jersey, as a state Senator, and as governor in 1860, the first to live at Drumthwacket. The original structure consisted of a center hall with two rooms on each side, including the 2 1/2-story center section and large portico with six Ionic columns.

In 1893, financier, industrialist, and Princeton University benefactor Moses Taylor Pyne purchased Drumthwacket from Olden's widow. Pyne was responsible for major expansions of the home, turning it into a magnificent estate, "surpassing anything previously built in Princeton". Pyne added two wings on each side of the house in 1893 and 1900, both designed by Raleigh C. Gildersleeve and including a paneled library. Pyne also added park-like landscaping, greenhouses, bridle paths, a dairy farm, and formal Italian gardens.

Pyne died in 1921, and his granddaughter Agnes Pyne sold the property to Abram Nathaniel Spanel in 1941. Spanel was an industrialist and inventor who had immigrated from Russia as a child. He founded the International Latex Corporation, which became the International Playtex Corporation. Many of Spanel's staff lived at Drumthwacket, and many of his patented inventions were conceived in the Music Room.

In 1966, the Spanels sold the estate to New Jersey with the intent that it be used as the governor's official residence, to replace Morven, the old governor's mansion. However, it took 15 years for the estate to be used as an official residence, with the New Jersey Historical Society raising enough funds in 1981.

In 1982, the Drumthwacket Foundation, a non-profit organization responsible for preserving, restoring, and curating the house and its grounds, was established by New Jersey First Lady Deborah Kean. In addition to establishing the Drumthwacket Foundation, Kean also oversaw the conversion of the mansion into the state executive residence. Kean renovated much of the public and ceremonial rooms in the mansion. Before the renovation, much of Drumthwacket was furnished with older, donated furniture, much of which was unsuited for the home's new ceremonial role. The First Lady replaced those furnishings with higher quality, antique furniture and decor needed for the formal residence. Despite her work, Governor Thomas Kean and Mrs. Deborah Kean chose to live in their own home in Livingston, New Jersey, rather than Drumthwacket.

Governor Jim Florio, who was in office from 1990 to 1994, and First Lady Lucinda Florio were the first gubernatorial couple to live at Drumthwacket. Mrs. Lucinda Florio also oversaw major renovations and played a key role in its conversion into a modern governor's residence. The First Lady focused much of her work on Drumthwacket's private living quarters, which had been largely untouched by her predecessor.

Florio and the Drumthwacket Foundation replaced the mansion's antiquated heating system, installed new plumbing and drinking water systems, and repaired uneven hardwood floors. Closets and storage spaces, which were absent from bedrooms in homes from the era, were added. Florio also acquired curtains and other window treatments, which were missing from many of Drumthwacket's windows.

Additionally in 1990, Florio restored the Italianate gardens on the 11-acre grounds surrounding Drumthwacket using private donations. The gardens were originally created in 1905 by the mansion's previous owner, Moses Taylor Pyne, but had fallen into disrepair by the 1990s. In 1990, First Lady Lucinda Florio hosted a small wedding reception for her father at the house..

In the Spring of 2026, newly elected Gov. Mikie Sherrill announced she was going to make Drumthwacket her official residence.

== Use by recent governors ==
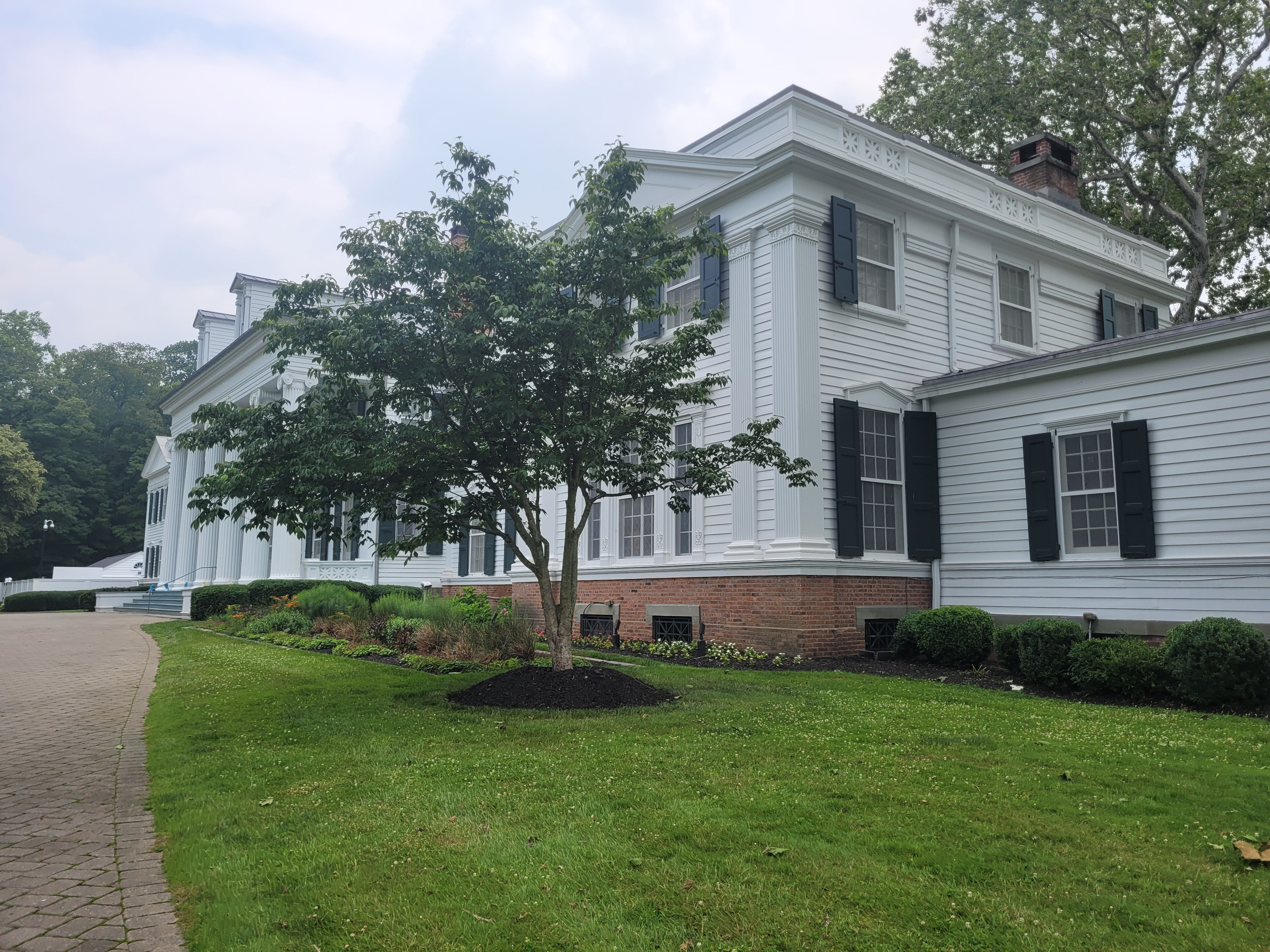
The front of Drumthwacket

- Thomas Kean (1982–1990) lived in his private home in Livingston.
- James Florio (1990–1994) lived full-time in the mansion.
- Christine Todd Whitman (1994–2001) lived part-time in the mansion.
- Donald DiFrancesco (2001–2002) lived part-time in the mansion.
- John O. Bennett (2002) lived in the mansion for his 3½ days as Acting Governor.
- James McGreevey (2002–2004) lived full-time in the mansion.
- Richard Codey (2004–2006) lived part-time in the mansion.
- Jon Corzine (2006–2010) lived part-time in the mansion. Drumthwacket became his full-time residence while he was recovering from injuries sustained in a severe automobile accident.
- Chris Christie (2010–2018) only used the mansion for Sunday dinners and official functions, while living in his private home in Mendham.
- Phil Murphy (2018–2026) used the mansion for official functions and meetings, while living in his private home in Middletown.
- Mikie Sherrill (2026–present) lives full-time in the mansion.

== Building details and tours ==
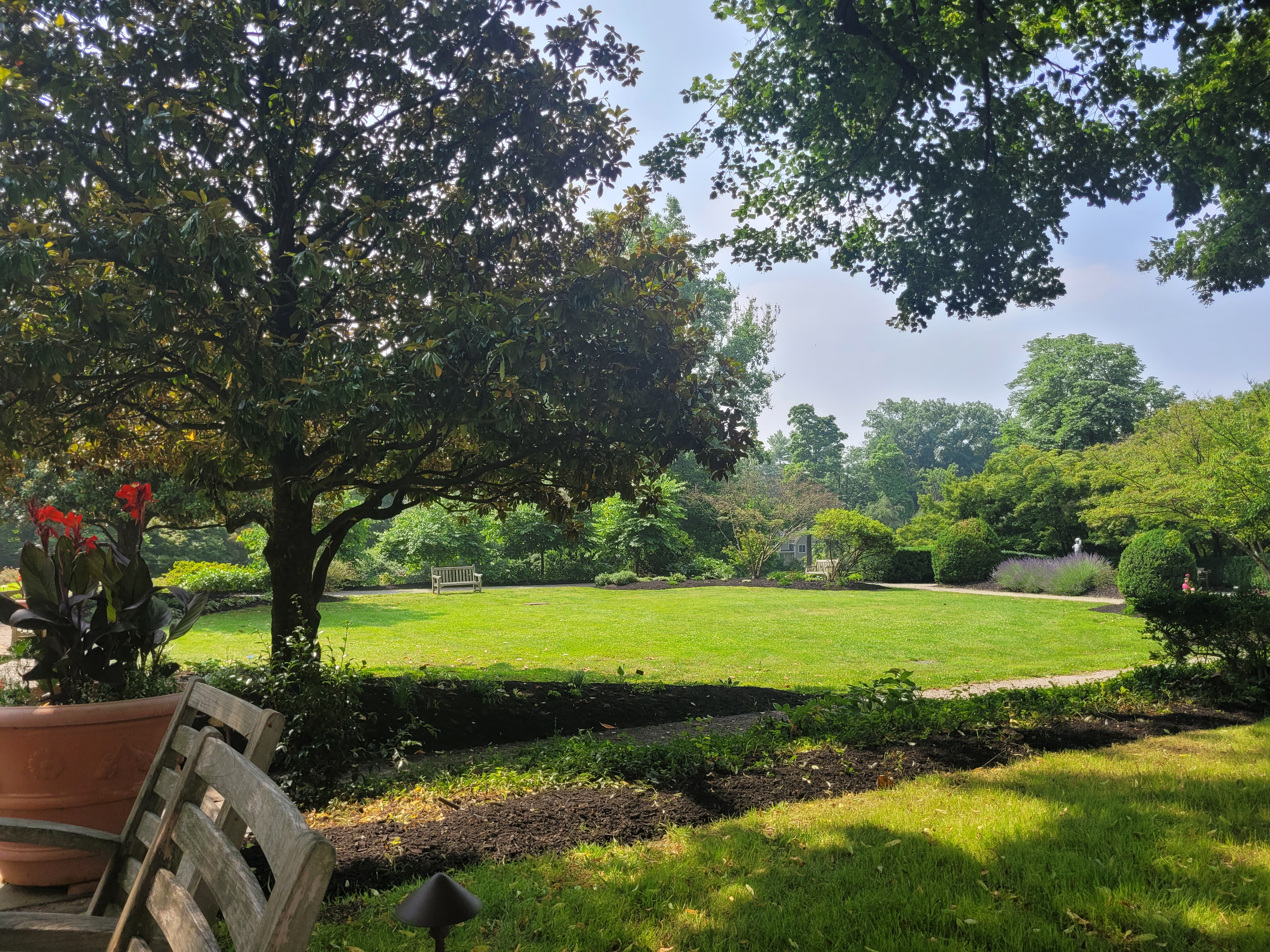
The back garden of Drumthwacket

There are 12 private rooms upstairs used by the first family and six public rooms on the main floor that are the site of many official functions. An annual Garden Club holiday display is a tradition at the property.

Drumthwacket is open for guided tours on most Wednesdays, except for August, the day before Thanksgiving, and several other dates. The tour includes the six public rooms used by the governor for meetings and receptions, as well as the solarium, center hall, dining room, parlor, music room, library, and governor's study. Guided tours are conducted by volunteer docents. Visitors can walk through the gardens and visit the Olden House, the restored farmhouse on the property that houses a gift shop and the Drumthwacket Foundation.

== See also ==
- Governor’s Ocean Residence - Official ocean front NJ Governor's residence at Island Beach State Park, NJ
