= Thomas Kean =

Governor of New Jersey from 1982 to 1990

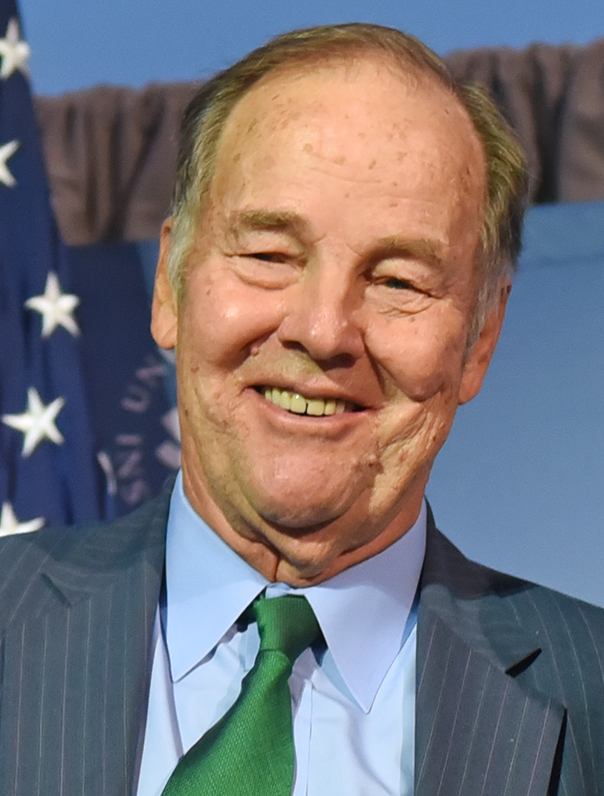
- Kean in 2018

President of the Carnegie Corporation of New York
- Acting
- In office April 15, 2021 – January 2023 Serving with Janet L. Robinson
- Preceded by: Vartan Gregorian
- Succeeded by: Louise Richardson

Chair of the 9/11 Commission
- In office December 15, 2002 – August 21, 2004
- President: George W. Bush
- Deputy: Lee Hamilton
- Preceded by: Henry Kissinger
- Succeeded by: Position abolished

10th President of Drew University
- In office 1990–2005
- Preceded by: Paul Hardin III
- Succeeded by: Robert Weisbuch

48th Governor of New Jersey
- In office January 19, 1982 – January 16, 1990
- Preceded by: Brendan Byrne
- Succeeded by: James Florio

Speaker of the New Jersey General Assembly
- In office 1972–1973
- Preceded by: Barry T. Parker
- Succeeded by: S. Howard Woodson

Member of the New Jersey General Assembly
- In office January 9, 1968 – January 10, 1978 Serving with Philip Kaltenbacher (1967–1974), Jane Burgio (1974–1977)
- Preceded by: Proportional representation
- Succeeded by: Frederic Remington
- Constituency: 11-F district (1968–1972); 11-E district (1972–1974); 25th district (1974–1978)

Personal details
- Born: Thomas Howard Kean; April 21, 1935 (age 91) New York City, New York, U.S.
- Party: Republican
- Spouse: Deborah Bye (m. 1967; died 2020)
- Children: 3, including Thomas Jr.
- Education: Princeton University (BA); Columbia University (MA)

Thomas Howard Kean Sr. (/keɪn/ KAYN; born April 21, 1935) is an American statesman and academic administrator who served as the 48th governor of New Jersey from 1982 to 1990. A member of the Republican Party, he served in the New Jersey General Assembly and was chair of the 9/11 Commission from 2002 to 2004.

Kean is a member of the Kean political family. His father, Robert Kean, was a member of the U.S. House of Representatives, and his grandfather, Hamilton Fish Kean, served in the U.S. Senate. After graduating from Princeton University, Kean worked as a history teacher and obtained a master's degree from Teachers College at Columbia University. He served in the New Jersey General Assembly from 1968 to 1978 and held the role of speaker of the Assembly from 1972 to 1973. Kean was elected governor of New Jersey in 1981 and was re-elected in 1985. A moderate Republican, Kean is regarded as a popular governor who promoted New Jersey tourism.

Following his two terms as governor, Kean served as president of Drew University from 1990 until 2005. After the September 11 attacks, Kean was appointed by President George W. Bush as chairman of the National Commission on Terrorist Attacks Upon the United States, widely known as the 9/11 Commission. On July 22, 2004, Kean and the commission released their findings in the 9/11 Commission Report.

Kean is the father of U.S. representative Thomas Kean Jr., who has represented New Jersey's 7th congressional district since 2023.

== Early life and education ==
Kean was born in New York City to a long line of Dutch Americans and New Jersey politicians. His mother was Elizabeth Stuyvesant Howard and his father, Robert Kean, was a U.S. representative from 1939 until 1959. Kean's grandfather Hamilton Fish Kean and great-uncle John Kean both served as U.S. senators from New Jersey. His second great-uncle was Hamilton Fish, a U.S. senator, governor of New York, and U.S. secretary of state. Kean is also descended from William Livingston, who was a delegate to the Continental Congress, was the first governor of New Jersey, and is considered a founding father of New Jersey.

Kean first attended The Potomac School in McLean, Virginia. When he reached fourth grade, he entered St. Albans School, a college preparatory school in Washington, D.C. In 1946, at the age of eleven, Kean was enrolled at St. Mark's School, an Episcopalian private school in Southborough, Massachusetts that was the alma mater of his father and his two older brothers.

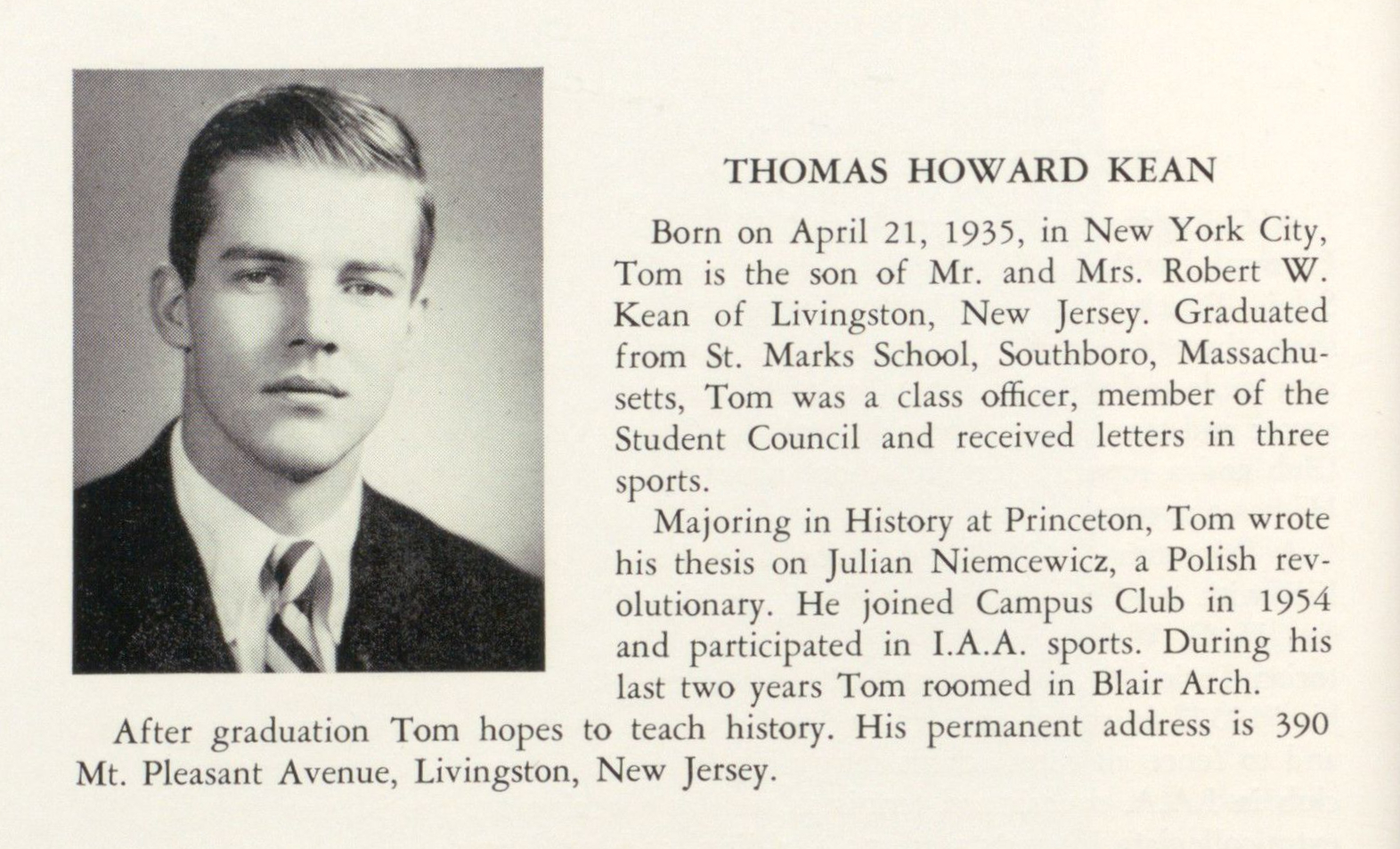
Kean in the Princeton University yearbook, 1957

After graduating from St. Mark's, Kean attended Princeton University. At Princeton, he completed a senior thesis on Julian Ursyn Niemcewicz, a key architect of the Polish–Lithuanian Commonwealth's constitution, entitled Niemcewicz (The Biography of a Polish Patriot, 1756-1842, Including His Impressions of America, 1797-1807). While at Princeton, Kean participated in the American Whig–Cliosophic Society, a political, literary, and debating society with a lengthy list of distinguished members. He graduated from Princeton with a B.A. in history in 1957. After working on his father's unsuccessful U.S. senatorial campaign in 1958 and returning to St. Mark's School as a history teacher for three years, Kean attended Teachers College at Columbia University in New York City, where he earned his M.A. in history.

== New Jersey General Assembly ==
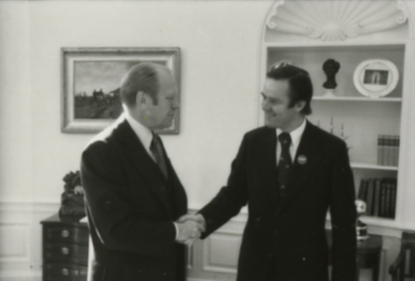
Kean with President Gerald Ford in December 1976

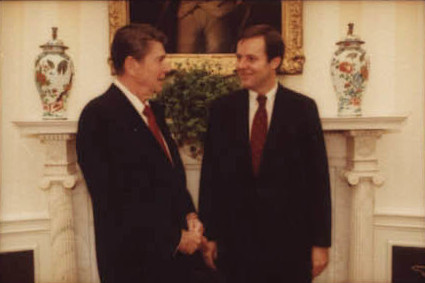
Kean with President Ronald Reagan in June 1981

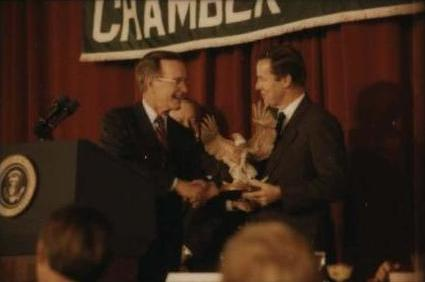
Kean with President George H. W. Bush in February 1989

In 1967, running as a moderate Republican, Kean was elected to the New Jersey General Assembly. He ran with Philip D. Kaltenbacher, a Short Hills Republican who had served as an aide to Assemblyman Irwin I. Kimmelman from 1964 to 1966; Kimmelman later served as Attorney General in Kean's administration as New Jersey governor. In the Republican primary, Kean and Kaltenbacher defeated Donald Fitz Maurice, Vivian Tompkins Lange, the sister of former U.S. Attorney William F. Tompkins, and Joseph Shanahan to win seats in the New Jersey Assembly.

At the start of the Assembly session in 1972, the New Jersey Assembly's then Democratic leadership sought to name S. Howard Woodson of Trenton as Speaker until Assemblyman David Friedland made a deal as one of four Democrats who voted to give the minority Republicans control of the General Assembly, and Kean was elected as Assembly Speaker. Woodson would have been the Assembly's first African American Speaker, and charges of racism were leveled against Friedland by fellow Democrats. In the following Assembly in 1974, Democrats united behind Woodson for Speaker, and Kean became the Assembly's minority leader. In 1973, Kean served briefly as acting New Jersey governor. In 1974, Kean ran for Congress in New Jersey's 5th congressional district but lost the Republican primary to Millicent Fenwick by 0.32%.

During the 1976 presidential campaign, Kean served as Gerald Ford's campaign manager for the state of New Jersey.

== Governor of New Jersey ==
=== 1977 election ===
In 1977, Kean ran unsuccessfully for the Republican nomination for governor of New Jersey. Although he spent most of his career as a political moderate, in this race Kean ran to the right of New Jersey Senate Minority Leader Raymond Bateman. Kean was unable to obtain the endorsement of many county Republican chairmen, or from then U.S. President Ford despite having served as Ford's campaign director for the state of New Jersey the previous year. Bateman defeated Kean and won the nomination, though Bateman went on to lose the general election to Brendan Byrne.

After the election, Governor Byrne appointed Kean as a commissioner on the board of the New Jersey Highway Authority. Kean also worked as a political commentator on New Jersey public television.

=== 1981 election ===
Four years later, in 1981, Kean again ran for governor. In his campaign, Kean pledged to foster job creation, clean up toxic waste sites, reduce crime, and preserve home rule. In his 1981 campaign, Kean secured the endorsement of former U.S. President Gerald Ford, who had not endorsed him in his 1977 gubernatorial campaign.

In the 1981 general election, Kean defeated Democratic Representative Jim Florio in the closest election in New Jersey gubernatorial election history, winning by 1,797 votes. The election was controversial due to the involvement of the Republican National Committee, who appointed a Ballot Security Task Force that was alleged to have intimidated voters. One of Kean's strategists in his 1981 campaign was Roger Stone, a self-proclaimed "GOP hitman."

=== 1985 re-election ===
In striking contrast to his slim 1981 victory, Kean won re-election in 1985 with the largest margin of victory ever recorded in New Jersey gubernatorial history, defeating Peter Shapiro, then Essex County Executive, 70%–29%. Kean won every municipality in the state except Audubon Park and Chesilhurst in Camden County and Roosevelt in Monmouth County.

=== Tenure (1982-1990) ===
As governor, Kean served on the President's Education Policy Advisory Committee and chaired the Education Commission of the States and the National Governors Association's Task Force on Teaching.

Kean began receiving national recognition following the launch of a multi-million dollar promotional campaign for New Jersey tourism, in television commercials promoting New Jersey as a tourist destination, that aired nationally during throughout his eight years as governor. In the ads, in which Kean was sometimes joined by various celebrities with New Jersey roots, including Brooke Shields and Bill Cosby, he recited the state's tourism motto: "New Jersey and You: Perfect Together". In 1998, the campaign was revived by then New Jersey Governor Christine Todd Whitman, capping a long-term, multibillion-dollar effort to promote the state and especially its Jersey Shore beach resorts as attractive vacation destinations.

Kean introduced a Holocaust curriculum in the New Jersey Public Schools. In 1982 he established The New Jersey Holocaust Council.

In 1988, Kean delivered the keynote speech at the 1988 Republican National Convention in New Orleans. Also in 1988, Kean authored a book entitled The Politics of Inclusion.

As governor, Kean played a central role in founding and funding the New Jersey Performing Arts Center in Newark, one of the nation's largest performing arts centers, that received roughly $200 million in state funding. Kean believed that the cultural center had the power to revitalize Newark and strengthen the state as a whole. Kean remained involved in advocacy for the arts years after his time as governor, criticizing arts funding cuts in 2007.

Kean practiced bipartisanship and outreach beyond traditional political constituencies. He worked extensively with traditional Democratic constituencies, especially on urban policies. He also divested New Jersey's public retirement funds from South Africa during apartheid, embraced the implementation of the statewide holiday in honor of civil rights leader Martin Luther King Jr., and supported legislation establishing New Jersey's Educational Opportunity Fund.

In January 1990, Kean was succeeded as governor by James Florio. A governor of New Jersey may not serve more than two consecutive terms.

=== Cabinet and administration ===
The Kean Cabinet
Office	Name	Term
Governor	Thomas Kean	January 19, 1982 – January 16, 1990
Secretary of Agriculture	Arthur R. Brown Jr.	July 1, 1982 – January 15, 2002
Attorney General	Irwin I. Kimmelman	January 19, 1982 – January 21, 1986
W. Cary Edwards	January 21, 1986 – January 19, 1989
Donald R. Besole	January 19, 1989 – February 14, 1989 (acting)
Peter N. Perretti Jr.	February 14, 1989 – January 16, 1990
Commissioner of Banking	Michael M. Horn	February 8, 1982 – March 20, 1984
Dominick A. Mazzagetti	March 20, 1984 – July 11, 1984 (acting)
Mary L. Parell	July 11, 1984 – January 16, 1990
Chair/Chief Executive Officer of the Civil Service Commission	Eugene J. McCaffrey	March 23, 1982 – September 25, 1986
Commissioner of Commerce and Economic Development	Borden R. Putman	April 1, 1982 – January 16, 1990
Commissioner of Community Affairs	John P. Renna	February 10, 1982 – November 29, 1985
Gerome R. White Jr.	November 30, 1985 – February 18, 1986 (acting)
Leonard S. Coleman Jr.	February 18, 1986 – July 6, 1988
Anthony M. Villane Jr.	July 7, 1988 – October 26, 1988 (acting)
Anthony M. Villane Jr.	October 26, 1988 – January 16, 1990
Commissioner of Corrections	William H. Fauver	June 15, 1978 – December 31, 1997
Adjutant General	Major General Francis R. Gerard	February 10, 1982 – April 9, 1990
Commissioner of Education	Gustav H. Rue	April 1, 1982 – July 7, 1982 (acting)
Saul Cooperman	July 7, 1982 – June 30, 1990
Commissioner of Environmental Protection	Robert E. Hughey	March 1, 1982 – January 30, 1986
Richard T. Dewling	February 4, 1986 – September 8, 1988
Christopher J. Daggett	September 8, 1988 – March 14, 1989 (acting)
Christopher J. Daggett	March 14, 1989 – December 31, 1989
Helen C. Fenske	January 1, 1990 – January 18, 1990 (acting)
Commissioner of Energy	Leonard S. Coleman Jr.	February 10, 1982 – February 18, 1986
Charles A. Richman	February 18, 1986 – April 4, 1988 (acting)
Commissioner of Health	Shirley A. Mayor	March 5, 1982 – October 4, 1982
Alan N. Koplin	October 4, 1982 – February 24, 1983 (acting)
J. Richard Goldstein	February 24, 1983 – August 1, 1986
Molly Joel Coye	August 6, 1986 – December 15, 1989
David L. Knowlton	December 15, 1989 – January 16, 1990 (acting)
Chancellor of Higher Education	T. Edward Hollinder	August 9, 1977 – June 30, 1990
Commissioner of Human Services	George J. Albanese	March 8, 1982 – June 30, 1985
G. Geofferys Perselay	July 1, 1985 – July 1, 1986 (acting)
Drew E. Altman	July 1, 1986 – August 18, 1989
Margaret Howard	August 19, 1989 – September 7, 1989 (acting)
William Waldman	September 8, 1989 – March 26, 1990 (acting)
Commissioner of Insurance	John G. Foley	January 25, 1982 – February 10, 1982 (acting)
Joseph F. Murphy	February 10, 1982 – April 16, 1984
Kenneth D. Merin	April 16, 1984 – October 9, 1984 (acting)
Kenneth D. Merin	October 9, 1984 – January 10, 1985
Jasper J. Jackson	January 10, 1985 – March 11, 1985 (acting)
Hazel Frank Gluck	March 11, 1985 – May 10, 1986
Kenneth D. Merin	May 10, 1986 – January 16, 1990
Commissioner of Labor and Workforce; Development	Roger Bodman	January 25, 1982 – February 5, 1982 (acting)
Roger Bodman	February 5, 1982 – July 1, 1984
William G. Van Note, Jr.	July 2, 1984 – October 1, 1984
Charles Serraino	October 1, 1984 – January 16, 1990
Personnel Commissioner	Eugene J. McCaffey	September 25, 1986 – June 9, 1989
Charles A. Nanry	June 12, 1989 – January 18, 1990 (acting)
Public Advocate	Joseph H. Rodriguez	February 11, 1982 – May 21, 1985
Amy R. Piro	May 22, 1985 – July 31, 1985 (acting)
Alfred A. Slocum	August 1, 1985 – March 24, 1986 (acting)
Alfred A. Slocum	March 24, 1986 – January 16, 1990
Secretary of State	Jane Burgio	January 19, 1982 – January 16, 1990
Commissioner of Transportation	John P. Sheridan	May 19, 1982 – May 4, 1985
Roger A. Bodman	May 10, 1985 – May 26, 1986
Hazel Frank Gluck	May 27, 1986 – July 7, 1989
Robert A. Innocenzi	July 7, 1989 – March 26, 1990 (acting)
State Treasurer	Kenneth R. Biederman	January 19, 1982 – February 25, 1982 (acting)
Kenneth R. Beiderman	February 25, 1982 – March 16, 1984
Michael M. Horn	March 20, 1984 – January 21, 1986
Feather O’ Conner	March 7, 1986 – January 8, 1990

=== Gubernatorial legacy ===
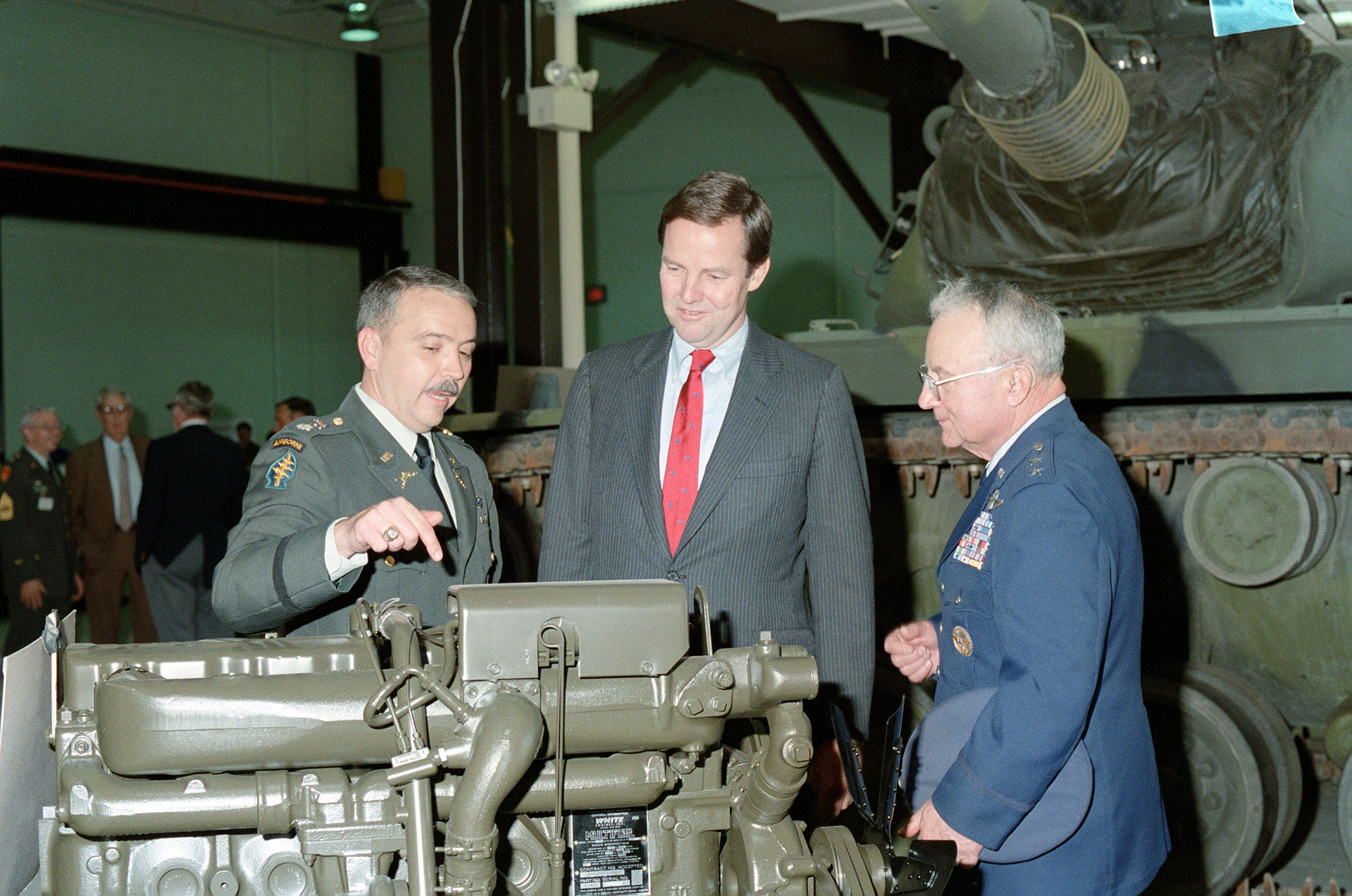
Kean visiting Fort Dix as New Jersey governor in November 1987

Kean left office in January 1990 as one of the most popular political figures in New Jersey political history. A number of leading New Jersey figures of the 1990s and 2000s began their political careers in Kean's administration, including Douglas Forrester, Bob Franks, and Chris Daggett.

In the aftermath of Kean's tenure as a two-term New Jersey governor, the Eagleton Institute of Politics at Rutgers University–New Brunswick's Center on the American Governor in New Brunswick, established the Thomas H. Kean Archive.

== President of Drew University ==
In 1990, following the end of his second gubernatorial term, Kean was named President of Drew University, a liberal arts university in Madison, New Jersey. During Kean's presidency, applications to Drew increased by more than 40 percent; the endowment nearly tripled; and more than $60 million was committed to construction of new buildings and renovation of older buildings. Kean would frequently eat lunch unannounced with students in the dining hall and was a regular spectator at Drew sporting events. Kean served as Drew's president until 2005, and also taught a highly selective political science seminar at the university.

== National policy leadership ==
In 1990, Kean for the first time began expressing views on foreign policy and national security matters that generally mirrored those of the Republican Party. In a December 15, 1991 speech to The Heritage Foundation in Washington, D.C., Kean endorsed free trade initiatives then under way by the George H. W. Bush administration. Kean also advocated continued U.S. aid to anti-communist resistance forces in Afghanistan, Angola, and to those engaged in supporting democratic change in the former Soviet Union. "To those supporting the Afghan resistance," Kean told the Heritage Foundation audience in 1991, "I say, carry on."

Kean was appointed to the boards of several important foreign policy bodies, including the U.S. government-funded National Endowment for Democracy (NED); a Presidential advisory commission on a post-Castro Cuba, which was chaired by former U.S. Presidential Republican candidate Steve Forbes; and President Bill Clinton's One America Initiative. He also served as an advisory board member for the Partnership for a Secure America. Kean served as co-chair of the National Security Preparedness Group (NSPG) at the Bipartisan Policy Center.

== Other work ==
=== Corporate board memberships ===
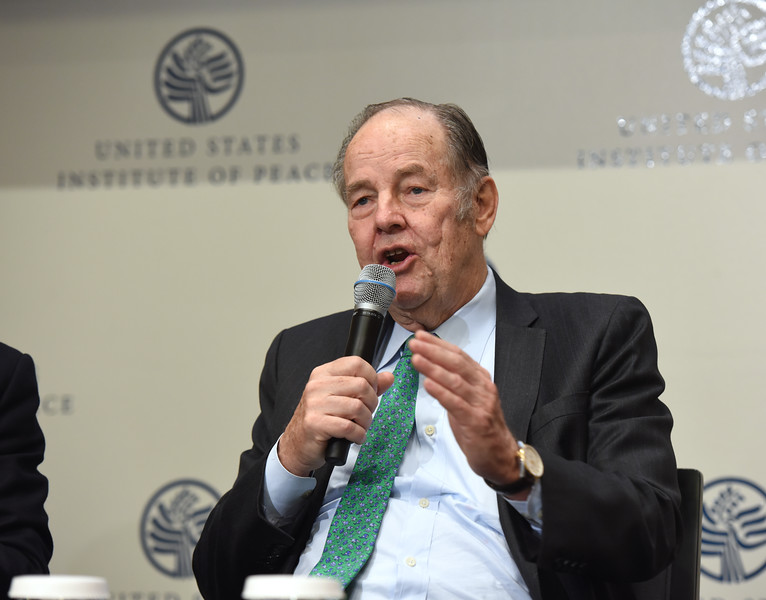
Kean speaking at the United States Institute of Peace in April 2019

Kean has served as chairman of The Robert Wood Johnson Foundation, the nation's largest health philanthropy; the National Campaign to Prevent Teen and Unplanned Pregnancy; the Carnegie Corporation of New York; Educate America; the National Environmental Education and Training Foundation; MENTOR: The National Mentoring Partnership; and the Newark Alliance. He has also served as a board member for several publicly traded companies, including Aramark, UnitedHealth Group, Hess Corporation, The Pepsi Bottling Group, CIT Group, and Franklin Templeton Investments.

In 2006, the U.S. Securities and Exchange Commission began investigating the conduct of United Health Group's management and directors, and the Internal Revenue Service and prosecutors in the U.S. Attorney's Office for the Southern District of New York subpoenaed documents from the company. The investigations came to light following publication of a series of probing articles in The Wall Street Journal in May 2006, which reported on the apparent backdating of hundreds of millions of dollars' worth of stock options by UnitedHealth Group's management. The backdating allegedly occurred with the knowledge and approval of the directors, including Kean, who sat on the company's compensation committee during three crucial years, according to The Wall Street Journal. Major shareholders filed lawsuits, accusing Kean and the other directors of failing in their fiduciary duty.

=== Columnist ===
From 1995 until 2018, Kean was a weekly columnist for The Star-Ledger, a Newark-based newspaper and the most widely circulated newspaper in the state. Co-authored with former New Jersey Governor Brendan Byrne, Kean's immediate predecessor as New Jersey governor, the column, titled "Kean-Byrne Dialogue", addressed issues of the day and was published weekly by The Star-Ledger.

=== Alpha Phi Omega and Quad Partners ===
Kean is also an advisor to, and has been inducted into, Alpha Phi Omega, a national service fraternity, and is a partner in Quad Partners, a private equity firm that invests in the education industry.

== Chair of 9/11 Commission ==
Following the September 11 terrorist attacks on the United States by al-Qaeda, political pressure grew for an independent commission to independently investigate why the attacks were not prevented by U.S. national security organizations, including the Central Intelligence Agency, Department of Defense, National Security Agency, and others, and to provide recommendations for preventing future terrorist attacks. The commission is widely considered the most important independent U.S. government commission since the Warren Commission, which was charged with investigating the assassination of John F. Kennedy in 1963, and perhaps the most important U.S. government commission in American history given its mammoth responsibility for investigating the causes of the first foreign attack on the U.S. mainland since the War of 1812, which represented the largest terrorist attack in world history, and recommending steps to defend the U.S. from future attacks. Kean's appointment to head the commission, and later the work and final report of the commission, drew substantial global attention.

=== Appointment and criticism ===
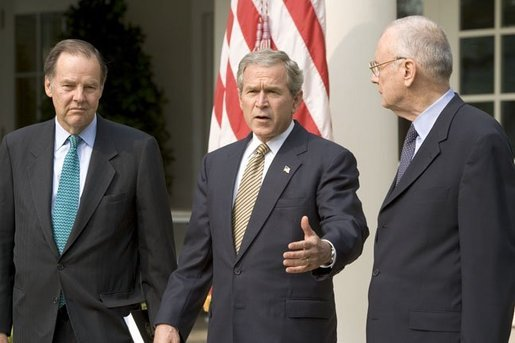
Kean with then-U.S. President George W. Bush and Lee Hamilton in the White House Rose Garden in July 2004

Bush initially selected Richard Nixon's former Secretary of State Henry Kissinger to head the 9/11 Commission. But Kissinger faced opposition due to his potential conflicts of interest with his global business consultancy, and withdrew from consideration for the position on December 13, 2002. Noting Kean's post-gubernatorial foreign policy involvement and his reputation as a consensus-oriented political leader, Bush nominated Kean as Kissinger's replacement in leading the important and politically sensitive commission.

Just as some had criticized Kissinger's nomination, Kean's leadership of the commission also drew some criticism. Some alleged that Kean did not have the depth of foreign policy and national security expertise needed to manage an investigation so integral to the future of American national security. Supporters of Kean in the Bush administration and elsewhere, however, countered that Kean's work since 1990 as a board member of the National Endowment for Democracy, the post-Castro Cuba Commission, and his foreign policy and national security commentary and analysis following his governorship established adequate national security and foreign policy credentials for him to assume such a critically important assignment.

=== Chairmanship and final report ===
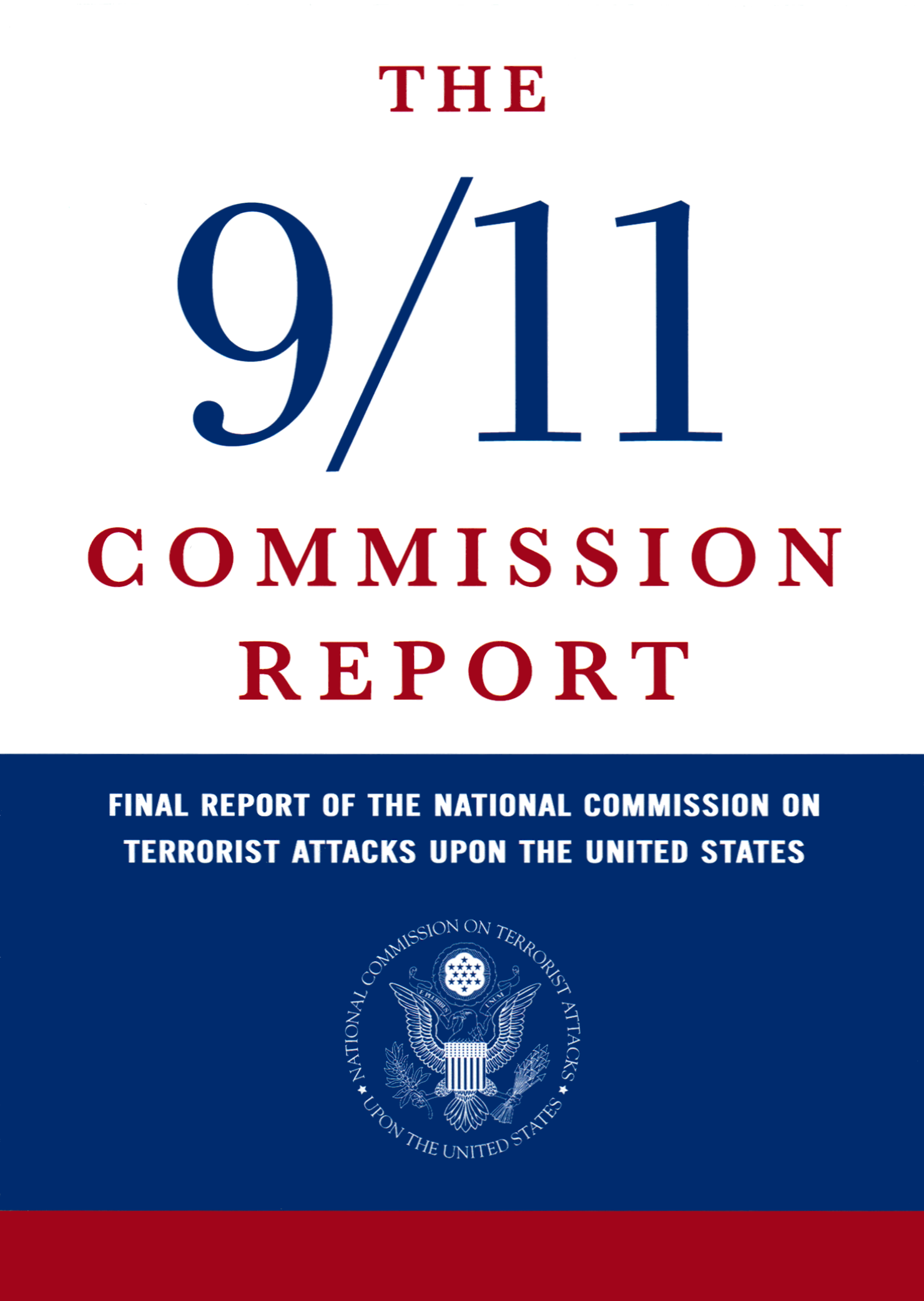
The cover of the 9/11 Commission Report, issued on July 22, 2004

In December 2003, as the 9/11 Commission neared completion of its investigation, Kean said that the September 11 attacks could have been prevented, saying, "As you read the report, you're going to have a pretty clear idea what wasn't done and what should have been done. This was not something that had to happen." On April 4, 2004, in an interview with Meet the Press, Kean again stated that the September 11 attacks could have been prevented, saying that the federal government should have acted sooner to dismantle al-Qaeda and responded more quickly to the terrorist threat it represented. "When we actually saw bin Laden on the ground, using the Predator or other means, did we have...actionable intelligence? Should we have sent a cruise missile into a site where he was at that point? I think those early opportunities are clear. We had him. We saw him. I think maybe we could have done something about it."

On July 22, 2004, the Commission issued its final report, the 9/11 Commission Report, a 585-page report that concluded that the CIA and the FBI ill-served President Bush and the American people in failing to predict or prevent the September 11 attacks, which the report concluded were preventable.

=== Later work relating to 9/11 attacks ===
On August 15, 2006, Kean and Commission Vice Chair Lee H. Hamilton released a book, Without Precedent: The Inside Story of the 9/11 Commission, published by Alfred A. Knopf. In the book, Kean and Hamilton write that the 9/11 Commission was so frustrated with repeated misstatements by The Pentagon and Federal Aviation Administration that it considered an investigation into possible deception by these government bodies concerning their response to the attacks.

Kean served as a paid consultant and spokesman for the ABC miniseries The Path to 9/11, which aired nationally in primetime in two segments, on September 10 and 11, 2006. The second part of the miniseries also aired without commercial interruption with the exception of a 20-minute break at 9 pm ET, when President Bush addressed the nation on the fifth anniversary of the September 11 attacks. While not technically considered a documentary by ABC, the series drew criticism prior to its airing for misrepresenting facts leading up the September 11 attacks. Bill Clinton, Madeleine Albright, many former high-ranking Clinton administration officials, and other scholars, publicly questioned the accuracy of the miniseries and asked that it not be aired. Albright called the miniseries' portrayal of her "false and defamatory." Former U.S. ambassador to Yemen Barbara Bodine also strongly criticized her own portrayal, complaining in the Los Angeles Times about the "mythmakers" who created it and calling the project "false."

On July 4, 2007, al-Qaeda publicly released a video of Ayman al-Zawahri, its deputy chief, urging all Muslims to unite in a holy war against the United States in Iraq and elsewhere. The 95-minute video also prominently featured video excerpts of Kean citing al-Qaeda as one of the most formidable security threats that the U.S. had ever confronted, presumably cited with the intention of bolstering the morale of al-Qaeda supporters. Comments by Kean cited on the video include a reference to the fact that al-Qaeda remained as strong in 2007 as it was before the September 11, 2001, attacks. The video also appeared to validate that al-Qaeda was closely monitoring U.S. political developments, especially including the work of the commission. It also suggested that al-Qaeda intended to focus not just on engaging the West in Iraq, but also in other countries. "As for the second half of the long-term plan," al-Zawahri says on the video, "it consists of hurrying to the fields of Jihad like Afghanistan, Iraq, and Somalia for Jihadi preparation and training".

The commission reassembled in Washington, D.C., on July 22, 2014, for the tenth anniversary of the issuance of its report. It assessed how well the government was performing given in addressing terrorist threats and to meeting the commission's recommendations for preventing a future attack.

== Caucus memberships ==
- Rare Disease Caucus

== Awards and recognition ==
Kean holds over 30 honorary degrees and numerous awards from environmental and educational organizations, including:

- The Four Freedoms Award
- NAACP's "Man of the Year" award
- The Senator John Heinz Award for Public Service
- The Global Interdependence Center's Frederick Heldring Global Leadership Award
- The Voice of September 11 Building Bridges Award
- The National Wildlife Federation's "Conservation Achievement Award"
- The Christopher and Dana Reeve Foundation's "Visionary Leadership Award"
- The American Institute for Public Service's Jefferson Award for Public Service
- The Arthur W. Page Center's "Larry Foster Award for Integrity in Public Communication"

In 2009, New York Waterways named the ferry Governor Thomas Kean in Kean's honor. On January 15, 2009, the ferry saved two dozen individuals when US Airways Flight 1549 made an emergency landing on the Hudson River.

In 2013, Kean was inducted into the New Jersey Hall of Fame.

== Personal life ==
Kean met his wife, Deborah Bye, at a party in Manhattan. They began dating in October 1966. Bye and Kean married at the Old Drawyers Church in Odessa, Delaware on June 3, 1967. The couple had three children: daughter Alexandra, and twin sons Tom Jr. and Reed.

Kean moved to Livingston, New Jersey in 1967 during his first campaign for office. As of 2015, Kean lived in Bedminster, New Jersey.

Deborah Kean died on April 24, 2020 at the age of 76. The Keans had been married for 53 years.

Political offices
Preceded by Barry Parker	Speaker of the New Jersey Assembly; 1972–1973	Succeeded by Howard Woodson
Preceded by Brendan Byrne	Governor of New Jersey; 1982–1990	Succeeded by Jim Florio
Party political offices
Preceded by Ray Bateman	Republican nominee for Governor of New Jersey; 1981, 1985	Succeeded by Jim Courter
Preceded by John H. Sununu	Chair of the Republican Governors Association; 1986–1987	Succeeded by Michael Castle
Preceded by Katherine D. Ortega	Keynote Speaker of the Republican National Convention; 1988	Succeeded by Phil Gramm
Academic offices
Preceded by Paul Hardin	President of Drew University; 1990–2005	Succeeded by Robert Weisbuch
Government offices
Preceded by Henry Kissinger	Chair of the 9/11 Commission; 2002–2004	Position abolished
U.S. order of precedence (ceremonial)
Preceded by Martha McSally as Former U.S. Senator	Order of precedence of the United States; Within New Jersey	Succeeded by Christine Todd Whitman as Former Governor
Preceded by Tom Wolf as Former Governor	Order of precedence of the United States; Outside New Jersey	Succeeded by Christine Todd Whitman as Former Governor
