= Deborah Kean =

American children's advocate (1943–2020)

First Lady of New Jersey
- In role January 19, 1982 – January 16, 1990
- Governor: Thomas Kean
- Preceded by: Jean Byrne
- Succeeded by: Lucinda Florio

Personal details
- Born: Deborah Elizabeth Bye; May 15, 1943 Wilmington, Delaware, U.S.
- Died: April 24, 2020 (aged 76) Bedminster, New Jersey, U.S.
- Party: Republican
- Spouse: Thomas Kean (m. 1967)
- Children: Thomas Jr.; Reed; Alexanda
- Education: Bennett College

Deborah Elizabeth "Debby" Kean (May 15, 1943 – April 24, 2020) was an American children's advocate. She served as the First Lady of New Jersey from 1982 to 1990 during the tenure of her husband, former Governor Thomas Kean.

Kean notably oversaw the conversion of Drumthwacket, a historic mansion in Princeton, New Jersey, into the official residence of the governor of New Jersey beginning in 1982. The first lady also established the Drumthwacket Foundation, a non-profit responsible for the restoration and upkeep of Drumthwacket and its grounds.

== Biography ==
Kean was born Deborah Elizabeth Bye on May 15, 1943, in Wilmington, Delaware. She was the only child of Robert Bye, a corporate executive, and Elizabeth (née Griffenberg) Bye. Kean attended Tower Hill School, a private college preparatory school in Wilmington. She graduated from Bennett College, a now defunct women's college located in Millbrook, New York. Bye met her future husband, a businessman named Thomas Kean, at a party in Manhattan, New York City, and began dating in October 1966. Bye and Kean married on June 3, 1967, in a ceremony at the Old Drawyers Church in Odessa, Delaware. They had three children: Thomas Jr., Reed, and Alexanda. The family moved to Livingston, New Jersey, in 1967 during her husband's first campaign for the New Jersey General Assembly.

Debby Kean served as First Lady of New Jersey from 1982 to 1990 during Governor Tom Kean's tenure in office. She chose to remain outside of active state politics, choosing instead to focus on children's issues, the arts, and historic preservation. In 1985, Kean took part in an interview and profile for the Trenton Times, provided that she not be asked about political issues. However, she held benefits specifically for Republican female candidates.

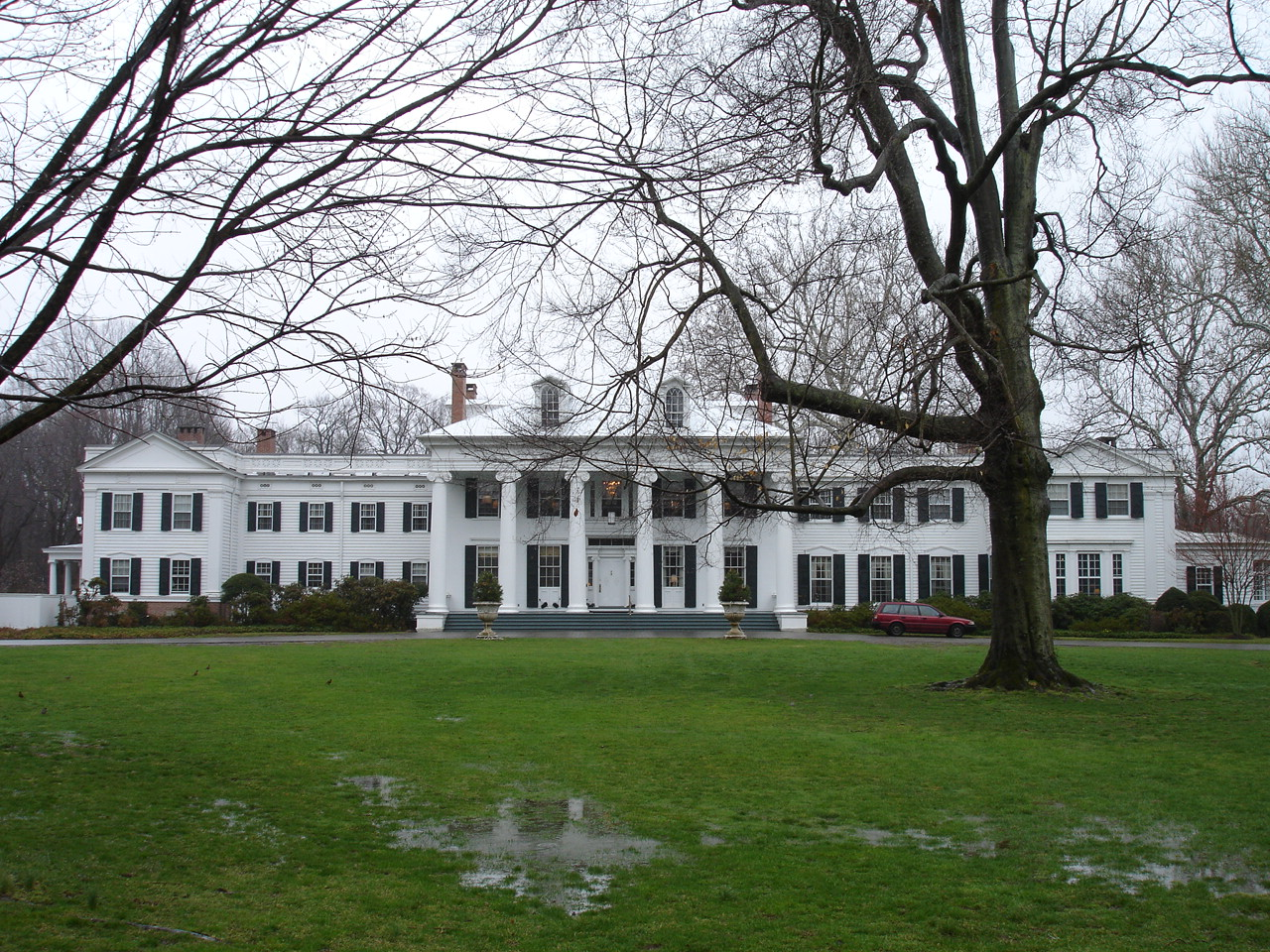
Debby Kean oversaw the conversion of Drumthwacket into the New Jersey governors' residence.

New Jersey did not have an official Governors' residence when Governor Kean took office in 1982. The state's previous governors' mansion, Morven, had been donated to the New Jersey Historical Society as its new headquarters.

The nearby Drumthwacket mansion in Princeton had been sold to the state of New Jersey in 1966, under the agreement that it eventually replace Morven as the governors' mansion. Shortly after Governor Kean took office, First Lady Debby Kean began overseeing the conversion of Drumthwacket into the New Jersey's new official residence. In 1982, the first lady established the Drumthwacket Foundation, a non-profit responsible for the upkeep of the mansion and its grounds. She solicited the funds needed to complete the repairs and renovations on the mansion. At the time, Drumthwacket was furnished with existing furniture that had been donated, much of which was older or unsuited for the home's new ceremonial role. Debby Kean replaced those furnishings with high quality, antique furniture and decor needed for the formal residence.

Kean also focused on children's and parenting issues during her tenure. She realized that many New Jersey state employees were struggling to obtain child care while they were working. She sought to establish new daycare facilities for the children of state, public employees and actively lobbied lawmakers for the funding. Several new childcare centers were opened across the state. She remains the namesake for the state's largest daycare center, the Deborah B. Kean Childcare Center in Trenton, which still operates, as of 2020. Additionally, the first lady served as the honorary chairperson of Governor Kean's commission on developmental disabilities. Kean also sponsored New Jersey's performing and visual arts programs.

Debby Kean died at her home in Bedminster, New Jersey, on April 24, 2020, at the age of 76. She was survived by her husband of 52 years, former Governor Thomas Kean, their three children, and seven grandchildren.
