= Kenneth Merin =

American politician

Commissioner of the New Jersey Department of Insurance
- In office May 10, 1986 – January 16, 1990
- Governor: Thomas Kean
- Preceded by: Hazel Frank Gluck
- Succeeded by: Jasper J. Jackson
- In office October 9, 1984 – January 10, 1985; Acting: April 16, 1984 – October 9, 1984
- Governor: Thomas Kean
- Preceded by: Joseph F. Murphy
- Succeeded by: Jasper J. Jackson

Personal details
- Born: 1947 (age 78–79)
- Party: Republican
- Education: George Washington University (BA, LLM); Seton Hall University (JD)

Military service
- Allegiance: United States
- Branch/service: United States Army
- Years of service: 1969–1972
- Battles/wars: Vietnam War

Kenneth D. Merin (born 1947) is an American Republican Party politician and lawyer who served two stints as the New Jersey Commissioner of Insurance.

== Early life ==
He is a 1969 graduate of George Washington University. From 1969 to 1972, Merin served in the U.S. Army, where he was a decorated infantry officer during the Vietnam War. He received his J.D. degree from Seton Hall University School of Law in 1975. In 1980, he received a LL.M. from the George Washington University Law School. From 1975 to 1980, Merin was a legislative attorney for the Congressional Research Service, the public policy research arm of the United States Congress.

== Kean Administration ==
In 1981, Merin joined the campaign of Thomas Kean for Governor of New Jersey as the Director of Research. After Kean was elected Governor, Merin joined his administration as the Deputy Chief Counsel to the Governor. He also served on the Board of Directors of New Jersey Transit.

Following the resignation of Joseph F. Murphy as state Insurance Commissioner in March 1984, Kean appointed Merin to serve as Acting Commissioner. He was later nominated to serve as Commissioner and won confirmation by the New Jersey State Senate.

A resident of Lawrence Township, Mercer County, New Jersey, Merin was appointed by Kean on January 12, 1985, to serve as Director of Policy and Planning in the Governor's office. He replaced Gary Stein, who had been appointed by Kean to the New Jersey Supreme Court.

On February 9, 1986, Kean announced that Merin would return to the cabinet as Insurance Commissioner. He held that post until the end of the Kean administration in 1990.

== Private Sector ==
After leaving state government, Merin headed the Insurance Coverage practice at Purcell Ries Shannon Mulcahy & O'Neill, a New Jersey law firm. He served as a Director of DSL.net, a nationwide provider of broadband communications services. He also served as president and CEO of the Charles Hayden Foundation.
