= John Whitman (businessman) =

First gentleman of New Jersey from 1994 to 2001

First Gentleman of New Jersey
- In role January 18, 1994 – January 31, 2001
- Governor: Christine Todd Whitman
- Preceded by: Lucinda Florio
- Succeeded by: Diane DiFrancesco

Personal details
- Born: John Russell Whitman; June 8, 1944 Albany, New York, U.S.
- Died: July 2, 2015 (aged 71) Morristown, New Jersey, U.S.
- Spouse: Christine Todd (m. 1974)
- Relations: Charles S. Whitman (grandfather)
- Education: Yale University; Harvard Business School (MBA)
- Occupation: businessman

John Russell Whitman (June 8, 1944 – July 2, 2015) was an American businessman and investment banker who was first gentleman of New Jersey from 1994 to 2001, as the husband of Governor Christine Todd Whitman. Whitman worked in the fields of banking and financial services.

== Early life and education ==
Whitman was born in Albany, New York in 1944. His grandfather, Charles S. Whitman, was the 41st Governor of New York (from 1915 to 1919), and his father, Charles Seymour Whitman Jr., was a New York civil court judge. He had a brother (Charles S. Whitman, III) and a sister (Janet Whitman).

Whitman earned a bachelor's degree from Yale University, graduating in 1966. He then was a first lieutenant in the US Army during the Vietnam War. He received an MBA from Harvard Business School in 1971.

== Career ==
Whitman began his banking career with Citicorp in 1972, eventually rising to vice president in charge of the Corporate Finance Department of Citicorp International Bank Ltd. in London.

Whitman was chairman and CEO of Prudential-Bache Interfunding from 1987 to 1990. He also was the managing partner of Sycamore Ventures, an international venture capital fund incorporated in the Cayman Islands.

During his wife's term as Governor of New Jersey, Whitman held no official role in her administration. He was appointed by his wife as co-chairman of the New Jersey World Cup Host Committee in 1994. He also mediated the 1995 negotiations between the New Jersey Devils and the New Jersey Sports and Exposition Authority that kept the Devils from moving to Nashville, Tennessee. In 1997, Whitman was appointed by his wife to head the fund raising committee to restore the dome of the New Jersey State House.

== Personal life ==
Whitman had met his future wife before they went on their first date, which occurred in 1973 at President Richard M. Nixon's inaugural ball. Whitman married the former Christine "Christie" Todd in 1974. They resided on a farm in the Oldwick section of Tewksbury Township, New Jersey. They had a son, Taylor, and a daughter, Kate, and six grandchildren.

On June 19, 2015, Whitman fell, resulting in a catastrophic brain injury. He died in a hospital at Morristown, New Jersey, on July 2, 2015, at the age of 71.

Preceded by Lucinda Florio	First Gentleman of New Jersey; 1994–2001	Succeeded by Diane DiFrancesco
