= Jean Byrne =

American teacher (1926–2015)

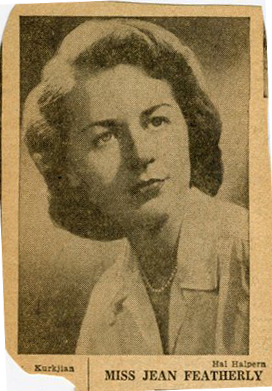
- Byrne in the early 1950s

First Lady of New Jersey
- In role January 15, 1974 – January 19, 1982
- Governor: Brendan Byrne
- Preceded by: Elizabeth Cahill
- Succeeded by: Deborah Kean

Personal details
- Born: Jean Featherly; October 17, 1926; Newark, New Jersey, U.S.
- Died: August 9, 2015 (aged 88); Princeton, New Jersey, U.S.
- Political party: Democratic
- Spouse: Brendan T. Byrne (m. 1953; div. 1993)
- Children: 7
- Education: Bucknell University (BA); New York University (MA)
- Occupation: Educator

Jean Byrne (October 17, 1926 – August 9, 2015) was an American educator who was the first lady of New Jersey from 1974 to 1982 during the tenure of her former husband, two-term Governor Brendan Byrne.

== Early life and education ==
Byrne was born Jean Featherly in Newark, New Jersey, to Jane Crysler Featherly and George Featherly. She was raised in nearby West Orange. She received her bachelor's degree from Bucknell University and her master's degree from New York University.

== Career ==
She taught second grade at an elementary school in West Orange, New Jersey. However, she was forced to leave her teaching position once she became pregnant with her first child, who was born in 1954. She referred to that era of mandatory withdrawal from public life during pregnancy as the "dark ages" during a 2013 interview with Rutgers University.

Brendan Byrne was twice elected Governor of New Jersey, serving from 1974 to 1982. As the state's First Lady, Byrne largely focused on issues related to healthcare and education. One of Byrne's main causes was advocating for research on Down syndrome, with which one of her daughters was affected. The role of First Lady also afforded Byrne the opportunity to host a number of dignitaries at Morven, the former New Jersey governors' residence in Princeton, including Queen Elizabeth II, Prince Philip, Duke of Edinburgh, and Grace Kelly. Jean and Brendan Byrne divorced in 1993.

== Personal life ==
She had married Brendan Byrne in 1953, with whom she had seven children: Brendan (born 1954), Susan (born 1956), Nancy (born 1957), Timothy (born 1961), Mary Anne (born 1963), Barbara (born 1967), and William (born 1969).

A resident of Princeton and an avid gardener, died from complications of babesiosis, a tick-borne illness affecting red blood cells, on August 9, 2015, at the age of 88. She was survived by six of her seven children.
