= Robert Weisbuch =

American academic administrator and professor

11th President of Drew University
- In office 2005–2012
- Preceded by: Thomas Kean
- Succeeded by: MaryAnn Baenninger

Personal details
- Education: Wesleyan University (BA); Yale University (Ph.D.)

Robert Weisbuch is an American academic administrator and professor. He served as the eleventh President of Drew University from 2005 to 2012.

== Biography ==
Weisbuch received a B.A. from Wesleyan University and a Ph.D. from Yale University. He spent 25 years at the University of Michigan, where he served as chair of the Department of English, associate vice president for research, associate dean for faculty programs, and interim dean of the Horace H. Rackham School of Graduate Studies. He then served as President of the Woodrow Wilson National Fellowship Foundation for seven years. In 2005, he became the eleventh President of Drew University

On May 2, 2012, Weisbuch announced plans to leave his position as of June 30, 2012 to devote more time to writing and scholarship. He is a member of EDUCAUSE.

== Bibliography ==
- Emily Dickinson's Poetry (1975)
- Atlantic Double-Cross: American Literature and British Influence in the Age of Emerson (1989)

Numerous essays on liberal arts and academia in Chronicle of Higher Education and elsewhere
