= Lucinda Florio =

American teacher (1947–2022)

First Lady of New Jersey
- In role January 16, 1990 – January 18, 1994
- Governor: Jim Florio
- Preceded by: Deborah Kean
- Succeeded by: John Whitman

Personal details
- Born: Lucinda Coleman; 1947 Lafayette, Indiana, U.S.
- Died: November 16, 2022 (aged 75) New Jersey, U.S.
- Party: Democratic
- Spouses: ? Rowe (div. 1980); James Florio (m. 1988; died 2022)
- Education: Glassboro State College (1975)

Lucinda Coleman Florio (1947 – November 16, 2022) was an American teacher and advocate for education and literacy, who, as the wife of then-New Jersey governor Jim Florio, served as the first lady of New Jersey from 1990 to 1994.

During her tenure, Florio established the state Office of the First Lady and completed major renovations on the new governor's residence, Drumthwacket.

== Biography ==
=== Early life and career ===
Florio was born Lucinda Coleman in Lafayette, Indiana, in 1947. The second of six siblings, her mother, Jane Coleman, was a restaurant worker and homemaker, while her father, Thomas Coleman, was an engineer who worked two jobs in shipbuilding and repairing boilers. The family relocated to Philadelphia, Pennsylvania, where they lived for four years, before settling in nearby Gloucester City, New Jersey, when Coleman was seven years old. Lucinda Coleman wanted to become a teacher, but since her working-class family never discussed college, she never expected to pursue higher education. She attended Gloucester City High School and transferred to the Seventh-day Adventist Garden State Academy in Sussex County, New Jersey, in her junior year. Though she was a student with excellent grades, Florio dropped out of high school during her senior year before graduation to marry her first husband. She and her then-husband had a son, Mark Rowe, a year after she left high school.

Coleman earned her high school equivalency at night and set a goal to graduate from college within the next 10 years. She first enrolled in Gloucester County College, a local community college, when her son was five years old, before ultimately earning her bachelor's degree in education from Glassboro State College, now known as Rowan University, in 1975, just six years later. In 1979, she was hired as a third grade teacher at John Glenn Elementary School in the Pine Hill Schools, a public school district in Pine Hill, New Jersey, where she taught for eleven years. Her first marriage had ended in divorce in 1980 after a five-year separation.

=== First Lady of New Jersey ===
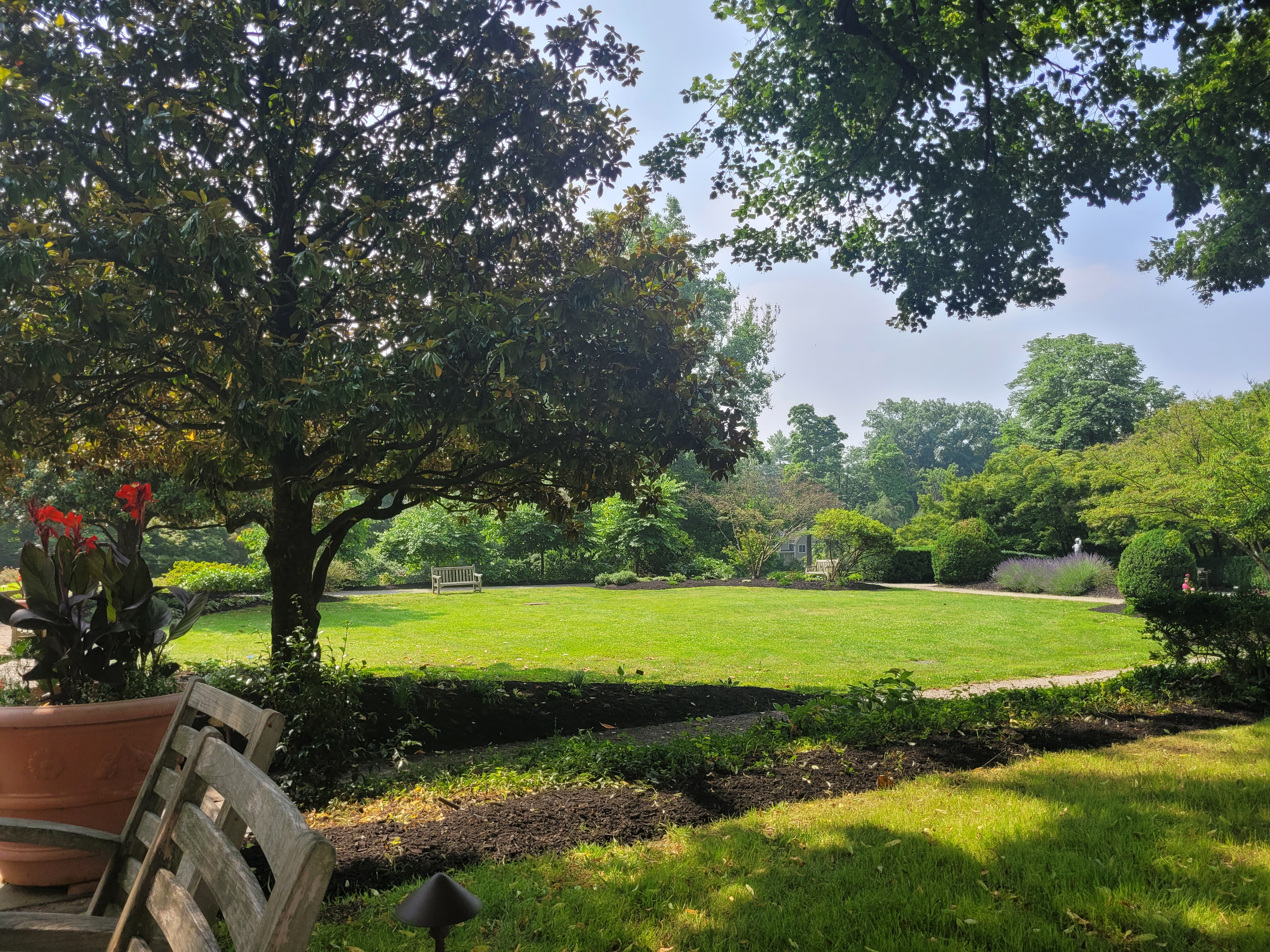
A view of the gardens at Drumthwacket, which were restored by Florio.

In 1984, Lucinda Coleman met her future second husband, James "Jim" Florio, while both were living in the same apartment complex in Pine Hill, New Jersey. Jim Florio, who divorced his first wife in 1985, was serving in the United States House of Representatives from New Jersey's 1st congressional district at the time. Coleman and Florio had similar life experiences in common. Both grew up in blue collar households and dropped out of high school when they were 17 years old, earning their bachelor's degrees years later. Each had children from their first marriages and had not planned to remarry. Lucinda and James Florio married on February 14, 1988, the second and final marriage for both.

Soon after their wedding, Jim Florio launched his third gubernatorial run for Governor of New Jersey, this time winning the 1989 election in a landslide. Lucinda Florio actively campaigned on behalf of her husband during the race and was credited by observers with softening his image with voters before and after the election. Ruth Mandel, director of the Eagleton Institute of Politics at Rutgers University, compared Florio's role to that of First Lady of the United States Barbara Bush in an interview with The New York Times, "Lucinda rounds out the Governor's character the way Barbara Bush rounds out George's character. She lends a human dimension people can relate to. It makes him one of them."

Florio left her teaching career to focus on her new role as the state's first lady. In 1990, the New York Times wrote that Florio was "becoming the most active First Lady New Jersey has seen in recent memory", in contrast with the relatively private roles of several of her predecessors. Florio established the new state Office of the First Lady, following the advice of other state first ladies whom she met through the National Governors Association. Under Florio, the new office and its staff coordinated her programs and appearances throughout the state. Through it, Florio focused on priority issues, including education, literacy, children's rights, and women's rights.

The Florios were the first gubernatorial couple to live at Drumthwacket, the governor's mansion in Princeton, New Jersey, which had been acquired in 1966. Florio's predecessor, First Lady Deborah Kean, had overseen the mansion's conversion into the governor's residence, completed major renovations, and established the Drumthwacket Foundation, a non-profit responsible for the restoration and upkeep of Drumthwacket and its grounds. Lucinda Florio also played a major role in the renovation of the mansion into the modern residence of New Jersey's governors and their families. She focused much of her efforts on the living quarters, which had largely been untouched by Kean, who had not lived in the house. Florio and the Drumthwacket Foundation replaced the mansion's antiquated heating system, installed new plumbing and drinking water systems, and repaired uneven hardwood floors. She also added additional closets and storage spaces, which most rooms lacked, and acquired new curtains and draperies, which were missing from many of the windows. Beginning in 1990, Florio also restored the Italianate gardens on the 11-acre (4.5 ha) grounds surrounding Drumthwacket using private donations. The gardens were originally created in 1905 by the mansion's previous owner, Moses Taylor Pyne, but had fallen into disrepair by the 1990s.

Lucinda Florio remained extremely popular with voters and leaders of the Democratic Party throughout her time as first lady, even after her husband's poll numbers fell following a tax increase.

=== Later life ===
Lucinda Florio remained active in education and charitable work after her husband left public office. She carved out her own public role as an advocate for early childhood education, women's rights, and literacy programs. She served as a trustee and education committee member at the Liberty Science Center in Jersey City. Florio also worked with the United Way of Middlesex County to evaluate their child care programs and co-chaired a $2.5 million capital campaign for the YMCA of Metuchen, which ranks as the largest child care provider in the region. Lucinda and Jim Florio lived in Metuchen, New Jersey, before moving to Moorestown in South Jersey during their later years.

Former Governor Jim Florio died on September 25, 2022. Lucinda Florio died on November 16, 2022, at the age of 75, just 52 days after the death of her husband. Governor Phil Murphy ordered flags to fly at half-staff on November 17, 2022, in Florio's honor. She is buried beside Jim Florio in Arlington National Cemetery in Arlington, Virginia.

Preceded by Deborah Kean	First Lady of New Jersey; January 1990 – January 2004	Succeeded by John Whitman
