= Father Bombo's Pilgrimage to Mecca =

Father Bombo's Pilgrimage to Mecca (alternatively titled Father Bombo's Pilgrimage to Mecca in Arabia in variant fragments of the text that survive) is an Orientalist prose satire and picaresque mock-epic coauthored by Philip Freneau and Hugh Henry Brackenridge while both men were juniors at the College of New Jersey (later Princeton University).

Penned in the autumn of 1770 but not published in its entirety until 1975, Father Bombo is regarded by some to be the first American novel, competing alongside a number of other possible candidates. Father Bombo is a contender "by virtue of its early date, its undeniably native origin and materials," the future literary contributions of Freneau and Brackenridge, and the significant political careers of their College of New Jersey classmates, who included James Madison and Aaron Burr. Madison, in fact, co-founded the American Whig Society with Freneau and Brackenridge in 1769 and was a literary collaborator.

The novel survives as one of the literary productions of the 'Paper War,' an exchange of satire that took place between the college's rival literary clubs, The American Whig Society and the Cliosophic Society. (The two organizations would later merge to form the American Whig-Cliosophic Society in the 20th century.) A roman à clef, Father Bombo recounts a number of thinly fictionalized events from the Paper War and caricatures Cliosophic Society members, who serve as the novel's absurd characters, including Bombo.

== Synopsis ==
As punishment for plagiarizing the classical Syrian satirist Lucian, Father Reynardine Bombo is commanded by an apparition of the "famous prophet Mahomet" to "take a long and tedious Journey to Mecca" on foot. To atone, Bombo must also convert to "Mahometanism," become a zealous devotee, and don a "Turkish habit and particularly that of a Pilgrim." His forced religious conversion does not prevent Bombo from frequently indulging in alcohol and pork during his pilgrimage.

Headed for the harbor of New York, Bombo sets off from his New Jersey "castle" (the fictional stand-in for the college's Nassau Hall) clothed in a turban and a "Turkish vest". Seeking quarter in inns, houses of ill fame, and at his father's castle on Long Island, Bombo initiates a series of angry disputes when the characters he encounters fail to show the respect and deference that is his due as a pilgrim. These episodes often devolve into gross-out humor and violent slapstick pratfalls, of which Bombo is the usual victim despite his great size and pugnaciousness.

While sailing across the Atlantic, Bombo is tied to the ship's yard-arm for propositioning the captain's wife and instigating a mutiny, abducted by French then Irish privateers, and finally set adrift in a barrel. Washing ashore on the Irish coast, Bombo tries his hand at teaching and panhandling.

Bombo's trek across the Middle East and arrival in Mecca hastily are featured in the book's final chapter. In Mecca, Bombo visits the mosque that purportedly contains the tomb of Mahomet, wherein he deposits dictionaries "in one of the most sacred closets of the place" in order to complete his penance and "pacify the Ghost of Lucian." Bombo returns safely to his castle in New Jersey, a refined and responsible scholar, and he eventually retires to a country estate in the vicinity.

== Rediscovery and sources ==
Father Bombo was thought lost after the original manuscript was destroyed in an 1802 fire in the college's Nassau Hall. A number of other archival materials preserved from the Paper War were also destroyed.

Prior to its rediscovery, only portions of the novel's third and final book were known to have been preserved in the notebook manuscript of Whig Society member William Bradford, a literary collaborator of Freneau and Brackenridge who would later become U.S. Attorney General.

The novel was recovered in its in entirety in 1957 in Kentucky, surviving in the manuscript notebook of Whig Society member John Blair Smith. This transcription was later donated to the Princeton University Library.

Written in a coterie style, Freneau and Brackenridge roughly alternate authorship between chapters. Chapters written by Freneau are initialed "JΓ," and chapters by Brackenridge are initialed "IL." These characters appear to form the inverted image of each other.

The satire of the Whig Society regularly ridiculed members of the Cliosophic Society by accusing them of being Tory Loyalists, reflecting what was likely a key political preoccupation of the day. Freneau and Brackenridge would go on to coauthor the openly nationalistic ode "The Rising Glory of America," which Brackenridge read at commencement in 1771.

Echoing Bombo's initial crime of plagiarizing Lucian, a number of moments in the text of Father Bombo's Pilgrimage to Mecca capture the traditional, yet often challenged, centrality of classical studies in American academia at the time. Several chapter epigraphs flub passages borrowed from ancient Greek and Roman authors. To raise money, Bombo attempts to sell an edition of the works of Xenophon, which he has personally corrected. This apparent disillusionment and growing disregard for classicism might reflect a transition in curricula that was then taking place at the College of New Jersey. Instituted by the college's president, John Witherspoon, emphasis was being shifted away from preparing students for religious ministry, which called for classical language training, and being realigned towards the incorporation of a more liberal range of practical subjects that would better prepare students for secular careers and public service.

Father Bombo also reflects an Orientalist preoccupation with Middle Eastern culture and language that was prevalent in that era not only among American academic institutions, but among American society at large. A unique feature of Father Bombo, however, is that the novel Orientalizes the entire American landscape: Bombo travels from castle to castle, inns are referred to as "Caravansera," a passing traveler is a "Janizary," and Anglophone names are Arabized. Because of its associations with despotism, accusations of Orientalized tyranny were usually reserved for elites or those thought to be abusing positions of power.
