= Old Drawyers Church =

Historic church in Delaware, US

- U.S. National Register of Historic Places
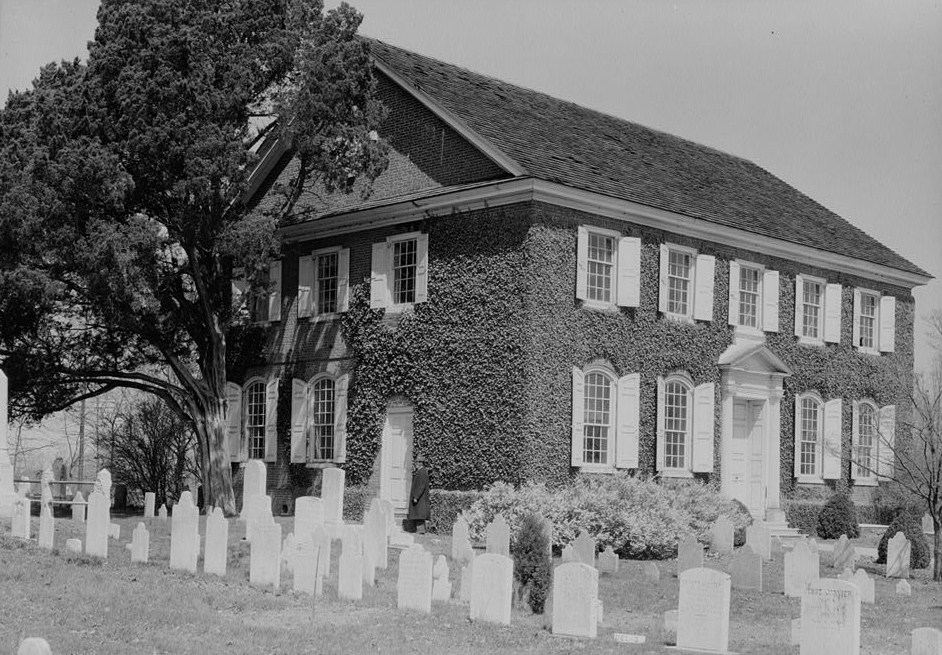
- Old Drawyers Church in 1936

- Location within Delaware Location within the United States
- Location: 2839 DuPont Parkway in St. Georges Hundred, near Odessa, Delaware
- Coordinates: 39.467669°N 75.654221°W
- Area: 5 acres (2.0 ha)
- Built: 1769-1773
- Architect: Duncan Beard, Robert May
- Architectural style: Georgian
- NRHP reference No.: 73000533
- Added to NRHP: February 6, 1973

Old Drawyers Church is a historic Presbyterian church on U.S. 13 near Odessa in New Castle County, Delaware, United States. The congregation was founded by Dutch and Swedish immigrants, though by the time the church was built the congregation was largely made up of Scottish immigrants.

It was built between 1769 and 1773, and is a two-story, five-bay brick building in the Georgian style. It features an elaborate Georgian doorway and gable roof. The interior features an ornate soundingboard, suspended over the open pulpit.

It was listed on the National Register of Historic Places in 1973.
