= CWG =

CWG may refer to:

- Campaign for World Government, international organization advocating for the establishment of a democratic federal world government
- Campaign Workers Guild, American trade union
- Commonwealth Games, sports event involving countries that generally were in the British Empire
- Conversations with God, a series of books by Neale Donald Walsch
- Croatian World Games, multi-sport international sports event
- Cawang LRT station, a light rail station in Jakarta, Indonesia
- CWG (repurposing company), New York State-based, recycles cell phones
- CWG Plc (formerly Computer Warehouse Group), a Nigerian information and communications technology company
