= 2026 New Jersey's 11th congressional district special election =

- April 16, 2026

New Jersey's 11th congressional district
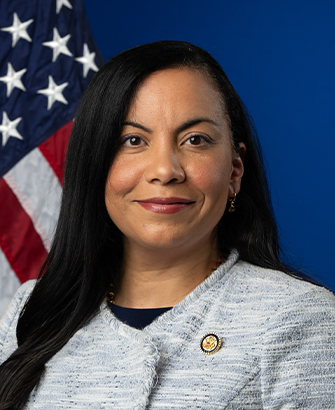

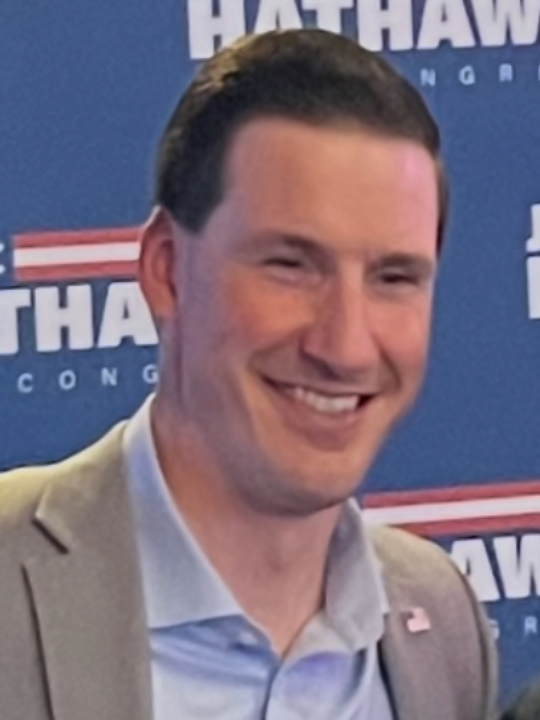
Nominee	Analilia Mejia	Joe Hathaway
Party	Democratic	Republican
Popular vote	81,825	53,520
Percentage	60.18%	39.36%
- Meija: 40–50% 50–60% 60–70% 70–80% 80–90% >90% Hathaway: 40–50% 50–60% 60–70% 70–80% Tie: 40–50%
U.S. representative before election
Mikie Sherrill
Democratic
Elected U.S. representative
Analilia Mejia
Democratic

The 2026 New Jersey's 11th congressional district special election was held on April 16, 2026, to fill the vacant seat in New Jersey's 11th congressional district. The winner will serve in the United States House of Representatives for the remainder of the 119th United States Congress.

The seat became vacant on November 20, 2025, when Mikie Sherrill resigned to become the governor of New Jersey. Outgoing governor Phil Murphy announced the special election scheduled for April 16, 2026. Early voting took place from April 6 to April 14. Voters had the option to cast their votes by mail.

Primary elections were held on February 5, 2026. Analilia Mejia, co-executive director of the Center for Popular Democracy, won the Democratic nomination. Randolph councilman and former mayor Joe Hathaway won the Republican nomination uncontested. Mejia would then go on to win the special election; her win was the best Democratic performance since 1982, the last time a Democrat won the district before 2018.

== Democratic primary ==
=== Campaign ===
Spending by AIPAC against former U.S. Representative Tom Malinowski became a major issue in the primary. Although Malinowski identified as a pro-Israel Democrat, the group funded negative advertising after he declined to unconditionally support foreign military aid. The ads may have inadvertently boosted eventual nominee Analilia Mejia, who has accused Israel of committing genocide in Gaza. Following his defeat, Malinowski sharply criticized AIPAC, calling its campaign "dishonest" and pledging to oppose any AIPAC-backed challenger to Mejia in the June primary for the full term.

Mejia has called for abolishing Immigration and Customs Enforcement (ICE) and has advocated resistance to what she describes as "rising authoritarianism".

The Associated Press and The New York Times called the race for Mejia on February 12, 2026, defeating Malinowski and former Lieutenant Governor Tahesha Way.

=== Candidates ===
==== Nominee ====
- Analilia Mejia, co-executive director of the Center for Popular Democracy

==== Eliminated in primary ====
- John Bartlett, Passaic County commissioner and candidate for this district in 2018
- Zach Beecher, venture capitalist
- J-L Cauvin, attorney and comedian
- Cammie Croft, nonprofit executive and former White House deputy new media director
- Brendan Gill, at-large Essex County commissioner, husband of state assemblymember Alixon Collazos-Gill, and candidate for New Jersey's 27th assembly district in 2023
- Jeff Grayzel, deputy mayor of Morris Township and nominee for New Jersey's 25th senate district in 2021
- Tom Malinowski, former chair of the Hunterdon County Democratic Party (2024–2025) and former U.S. representative from the 7th district (2019–2023)
- Justin Strickland, Chatham Borough councilmember
- Tahesha Way, former lieutenant governor (2023–2026) and secretary of state of New Jersey (2018–2026)
- Anna Lee Williams, corporate social responsibility manager

==== Withdrawn ====
- Marc Chaaban, former congressional staffer (remained on ballot, endorsed Mejia)
- Dean Dafis, Maplewood Township committeeman and former mayor (remained on ballot, endorsed Gill)

==== Disqualified ====
- Donald Cresitello, former mayor of Morristown (1977–1981, 2006–2010) and candidate for U.S. Senate in 1982 and 2008

==== Did not file ====
- Kennedy Pivnick, former legal intern at the Federal Energy Regulatory Commission

==== Declined ====
- Matthew Platkin, attorney general of New Jersey (2022–2026)

=== Endorsements ===
John Bartlett

Local officials

- James Damiano, mayor of Little Falls (2017–present)

Labor unions

- Port Authority Police Benevolent Association

Party branches

- Little Falls Democratic Committee
- Passaic County Democratic Committee (co-endorsement with Way)
Zach Beecher

U.S. senators

- Bob Kerrey, Nebraska (1989–2001)

Individuals

- Paul Eaton, former deputy chief of staff for the U.S. Army Training and Doctrine Command

Labor unions

- National Association of Government Employees

Organizations

- Taking the Hill
- VoteVets
- With Honor Fund
Brendan Gill

Executive branch officials

- Jeh Johnson, former U.S. secretary of homeland security (2013–2017)
- Megan Coyne, former White House Deputy Director of Platforms (2022–2025)

U.S. representatives

- Steve Rothman, former NJ-09 (1997–2013)

Statewide officials

- Phil Murphy, governor of New Jersey (2018–2026)

State legislators

- Renee Burgess, state senator from the 28th district (2022–present)
- Alixon Collazos-Gill, state assemblymember from the 27th district (2024–present) (candidate's wife)
- Thomas Giblin, former state assemblymember from the 34th district (2006–2024)
- John McKeon, state senator from the 27th district (2024–present)
- Carmen Morales, state assemblymember from the 34th district (2024–present)
- Jessica Ramirez, former state assemblymember from the 32nd district (2024–2026)
- Teresa Ruiz, majority leader of the New Jersey Senate (2022–present) from the 29th district (2008–present)
- Shavonda Sumter, former state assemblymember from the 35th district (2012–2026)
- Britnee Timberlake, state senator from the 34th district (2024–present)
- Michael Venezia, state assemblymember from the 34th district (2024–present)
- William D. Payne, former state assemblymember from the 29th district (1998–2008)
- Jackie Yustein, former state assemblymember from the 28th district (2023–2024)

Local officials

- Joseph DiVincenzo Jr., Essex County Executive (2003–present)
- Jim Johnson, former Corporation Counsel of New York City (2019–2021)
- Thomas Sullivan, Bergen County Commissioner (2015–present)
- Dean Dafis, Maplewood Township committeeman and former candidate for this seat
- 5 Essex County Commissioners
- 13 mayors

Party officials

- LeRoy Jones, chair of the New Jersey Democratic State Committee (2021–present) and chair of the Essex County Democratic Committee
- 12 Democratic municipal chairs (Note: Belleville, Bloomfield, Cedar Grove, East Orange, Fairfield, Glen Ridge, Millburn, Nutley, Roseland, South Orange, West Caldwell, West Orange)

Individuals

- Evie Colbert, president of Montclair Film and wife of Stephen Colbert
- Harold Daggett, president of the International Longshoremen's Association (2011–present)

Party branches

- Essex County Democratic Committee

Labor unions

- Amalgamated Transit Union New Jersey State Council
- American Federation of Government Employees Local 913
- Brotherhood of Locomotive Engineers and Trainmen New Jersey State Legislative Board
- Communications Workers of America Local 1031
- Essex-West Hudson Labor Council
- Hotel and Gaming Trades Council
- International Association of Sheet Metal, Air, Rail and Transportation Workers Local 25
- International Brotherhood of Electrical Workers Locals 164 and 1158
- International Brotherhood of Teamsters
- Teamsters Joint Council 73
- International Federation of Professional and Technical Engineers Local 196
- International Longshoremen's Association
- Retail, Wholesale and Department Store Union Local 108
- United Food and Commercial Workers
Tom Malinowski

Executive branch officials

- Dan Shapiro, former U.S. ambassador to Israel (2011–2017)

U.S. senators

- Andy Kim, New Jersey (2024–present)

U.S. representatives

- Jason Crow, CO-06 (2019–present)
- Jamie Raskin, MD-08 (2017–present)

Local officials

- Sheena Collum, mayor of South Orange, New Jersey (2015–present)
- Carolyn Dempsey, mayor of Chatham Borough (2024–present)

Individuals

- Julie Roginsky, founder of Lift Our Voices

Party branches

- Morris County Democratic Committee

Labor unions

- International Association of Sheet Metal, Air, Rail and Transportation Workers Transportation Division

Organizations

- J Street
Analilia Mejia

U.S. senators

- Bernie Sanders, Vermont (2007–present) (Independent)
- Elizabeth Warren, Massachusetts (2013–present)

U.S. representatives

- Greg Casar, TX-35 (2023–present)
- Adriano Espaillat, NY-13 (2017–present)
- Maxwell Frost, FL-10 (2023–present)
- Chuy García, IL-04 (2019–present)
- Pramila Jayapal, WA-07 (2017–present)
- Ro Khanna, CA-17 (2017–present)
- Alexandria Ocasio-Cortez, NY-14 (2019–present)
- Ayanna Pressley, MA-07 (2019–present)
- Delia Ramirez, IL-03 (2023–present)

Statewide officials

- Keith Ellison, attorney general of Minnesota (2019–present)

State legislators

- Loretta Weinberg, former majority leader of the New Jersey Senate (2012–2022) from the 37th district (2005–2022)

Local officials

- Ras Baraka, mayor of Newark (2014–present)
- Brad Lander, former New York City Comptroller (2022–2025)
- Antonio Reynoso, Brooklyn Borough President (2022–present)

Individuals

- Marc Chaaban, former congressional staffer and former candidate for this seat

Political parties

- Working Families Party

Labor unions

- 1199SEIU United Healthcare Workers East
- Communications Workers of America District 1 and Local 1037
- Rutgers AAUP–AFT
- Rutgers Adjunct Faculty Union
- SEIU 32BJ
- SEIU New Jersey State Council

Organizations

- College Democrats of New Jersey
- Congressional Progressive Caucus PAC
- Latino Victory
- Make the Road Action New Jersey
- National Korean American Service & Education Consortium Action Fund New Jersey
- NJ Citizen Action
- Our Revolution
- Popular Democracy in Action (candidate's employer)
- Progressive Change Campaign Committee
- Progressive Victory
- Showing Up for Racial Justice
- Track AIPAC
Tahesha Way

U.S. representatives

- Gregory Meeks, NY-05 (1998–present)

Statewide officials

- Sarah Copeland Hanzas, Secretary of State of Vermont (2023–present)
- Kyle Evans Gay, lieutenant governor of Delaware (2025–present)
- Regena Thomas, former Secretary of State of New Jersey (2002–2006)
- Stephanie Thomas, Secretary of the State of Connecticut (2023–present)

State legislators

- Linda S. Carter, state assemblywoman from the 22nd district (2018–present)
- Cleopatra Tucker, state assemblywoman from the 28th district (2008–present)

Individuals

- Leslie Maxie, former track and field athlete

Party branches

- Passaic County Democratic Committee (co-endorsement with Bartlett)

Organizations

- Congressional Black Caucus PAC
- Democratic Lieutenant Governors Association
- Democratic Majority for Israel PAC
Declined to endorse

Statewide officials

- Mikie Sherrill, governor of New Jersey (2026–present) and former Representative from this district (2019–2025)

=== County conventions ===
County convention results

Essex County Democratic convention
Party	Candidate	Votes	%
Democratic	Brendan Gill	132	51.5%
Democratic	No Endorsement (Abstained)	90	35.2%
Democratic	Tom Malinowski	17	6.6%
Democratic	John Bartlett	6	2.3%
Democratic	Dean Dafis	4	1.6%
Democratic	Analilia Mejia	3	1.2%
Democratic	Tahesha Way	3	1.2%
Democratic	Marc Chaaban	1	0.4%
Democratic	Zach Beecher	0	0.0%
Democratic	J-L Cauvin	0	0.0%
Democratic	Cammie Croft	0	0.0%
Democratic	Justin Strickland	0	0.0%
Democratic	Anna Lee Williams	0	0.0%
Total votes		256	100.0%

Morris County Democratic convention
Candidate	First ballot		Second ballot		Third ballot		Fourth ballot		Fifth ballot		Sixth ballot		Seventh ballot		Eighth ballot		Ninth ballot	
Candidate	Votes	%	Votes	%	Votes	%	Votes	%	Votes	%	Votes	%	Votes	%	Votes	%	Votes	%
Tom Malinowski	188	40.8%	189	41.0%	192	41.8%	195	42.5%	199	43.4%	205	44.7%	217	47.4%	220	49.1%	235	52.7%
Brendan Gill	110	23.9%	110	23.9%	110	24.0%	110	24.0%	110	24.0%	111	24.2%	117	25.6%	117	26.1%	131	29.4%
Analilia Mejia	36	7.8%	36	7.8%	36	7.8%	36	7.8%	44	9.6%	47	10.2%	48	10.5%	62	13.8%	80	17.9%
Tahesha Way	28	6.1%	28	6.1%	28	6.1%	29	6.3%	31	6.8%	36	7.8%	41	9.0%	49	10.9%	Eliminated	
Justin Strickland	31	6.7%	31	6.7%	31	6.8%	31	6.8%	32	7.0%	34	7.4%	35	7.6%	Eliminated			
John Bartlett	22	4.8%	23	5.0%	24	5.2%	25	5.5%	25	5.5%	26	5.7%	Eliminated					
Zach Beecher	13	2.8%	15	3.3%	15	3.3%	17	3.7%	18	3.9%	Eliminated							
Anna Lee Williams	8	1.7%	8	1.7%	8	1.7%	8	1.7%	Eliminated									
Cammie Croft	7	1.5%	8	1.7%	8	1.7%	8	1.7%	Eliminated									
Dean Dafis	7	1.5%	7	1.5%	7	1.5%	Eliminated											
Jeff Grayzel	6	1.3%	6	1.3%	Eliminated													
J-L Cauvin	5	1.1%	Eliminated															
Total ballots (Note: 2 delegates abstained)	461 ballots				459 ballots								458 ballots		448 ballots		446 ballots	

Democratic county party endorsements Gill Malinowski Co-endorsement of Bartlett and Way

=== Fundraising ===
Campaign finance reports as of January 16, 2026
Candidate	Raised	Spent	Cash on hand
John Bartlett (D)	$465,705 (Note: $100,000 of this total was self-funded by Bartlett)	$394,510	$260,855
Zach Beecher (D)	$504,638	$293,417	$211,221
J-L Cauvin (D)	$100,000	$30,896	$69,103
Cammie Croft (D)	$372,317	$239,229	$133,088
Brendan Gill (D)	$808,103 (Note: $150,000 of this total was self-funded by Gill)	$460,108	$347,995
Jeff Grayzel (D)	$428,173	$351,604	$76,569
Tom Malinowski (D)	$1,161,127	$756,929	$404,197
Analilia Mejia (D)	$420,218	$62,097	$358,120
Justin Strickland (D)	$70,012	$67,836	$2,175
Tahesha Way (D)	$404,541	$319,178	$85,363
Anna Lee Williams (D)	$26,422	$18,249	$8,172
Source: Federal Election Commission

=== Polling ===
Poll source	Date(s) administered	Sample size (Note: Key: A – all adults RV – registered voters LV – likely voters V – unclear)	Margin of error	Brendan Gill	Tom Malinowski	Analilia Mejia	Tahesha Way	Other	Undecided
GQR Research (D) (Note: Poll sponsored by Malinowski's campaign)	November 19–23, 2025	400 (LV)	± 5.4%	12%	28%	5%	5%	19% (Note: "Other" with 14%; Bartlett and Grayzel with 2%; Beecher with 1%)	31%

=== Results ===
Democratic primary results
Party	Candidate	Votes	%
Democratic	Analilia Mejia	19,789	29.33
Democratic	Tom Malinowski	18,603	27.57
Democratic	Tahesha Way	11,737	17.40
Democratic	Brendan Gill	9,556	14.16
Democratic	John Bartlett	1,825	2.71
Democratic	Justin Strickland	1,391	2.06
Democratic	Jeff Grayzel	1,311	1.94
Democratic	Zach Beecher	1,310	1.94
Democratic	Cammie Croft	719	1.07
Democratic	Anna Lee Williams	528	0.78
Democratic	J-L Cauvin	293	0.43
Democratic	Dean Dafis (withdrawn)	280	0.42
Democratic	Marc Chaaban (withdrawn)	123	0.18
Total votes		67,465	100.00

Results by county: Mejia: 20–30%; 30–40%; Malinowski: 30–40%

Results by municipality: Mejia: 20–30%; 30–40%; 40–50%; Malinowski: 20–30%; 30–40%; 40–50%; 50–60%; 60–70%; Way: 20–30%; 30–40%; Gill: 20–30%; 30–40%

== Republican primary ==
=== Candidates ===
==== Nominee ====
- Joe Hathaway, Randolph Township Council member and former mayor

=== Endorsements ===
Joe Hathaway

U.S. representatives

- Thomas Kean Jr., NJ-07 (2023–present)

State legislators

- Brian Bergen, state assemblymember from the 26th district (2020–present)
- Al Barlas, state assemblymember from the 40th district (2024–present)
- Christopher DePhillips, state assemblymember from the 40th district (2018–present)
- Aura Dunn, state assemblymember from the 25th district (2019–present)
- Mike Inganamort, state assemblymember from the 24th district (2024–present)
- Dawn Fantasia, state assemblymember from the 24th district (2024–present)
- Anthony Bucco, minority leader of the New Jersey Senate (2023–present) from the 25th district (2019–present)
- Joseph Pennacchio, minority whip of the New Jersey Senate (2017–present) from the 26th district (2008–present)
- Kristin Corrado, state senator from the 40th district (2017–present)

Local officials

- Jim Gannon, sheriff of Morris County (2017–present) and nominee for lieutenant governor in 2025

=== Fundraising ===
Campaign finance reports as of January 16, 2026
Candidate	Raised	Spent	Cash on hand
Joe Hathaway (R)	$260,813	$98,933	$161,879
Source: Federal Election Commission

=== Results ===
Republican primary results
Party	Candidate	Votes	%
Republican	Joe Hathaway	14,616	100.00
Total votes		14,616	100.00

== Third parties and independents ==
=== Candidates ===
==== Declared ====
- Alan Bond (Hope For Tomorrow! (Note: Not an actual political party. In New Jersey, independent candidates are allowed to choose a ballot label)), former money manager

== General election ==
=== Predictions ===
Source	Ranking	As of
Sabato's Crystal Ball	Safe D	December 14, 2025

=== Post-primary endorsements ===
Analilia Mejia (D)

U.S. senators

- Cory Booker, New Jersey (2013–present)
- Andy Kim, New Jersey (2024–present)

U.S. representatives

- Tom Malinowski, former NJ-07 (2019–2023) and former candidate for this seat
- Rob Menendez, NJ-08 (2023–present)
- LaMonica McIver, NJ-10 (2024–present)
- Bonnie Watson Coleman, NJ-12 (2015–present)
- Donald Norcross, NJ-01 (2014–present)
- Herb Conaway, NJ-03 (2025–present)
- Frank Pallone, NJ-06 (1988–present)
- Nellie Pou, NJ-09 (2025–present)
- Jamie Raskin, MD-08 (2017–present)
- Linda Sánchez, CA-38 (2003–present)

Statewide officials

- Mikie Sherrill, governor of New Jersey (2026–present) and former NJ-11 (2019–2025)

Local officials

- Brendan Gill, Essex County commissioner and former candidate for this seat
- Mayors of 10 New Jersey municipalities

Party officials

- LeRoy Jones, chair of the New Jersey Democratic Party (2021–present)
- Ken Martin, chair of the Democratic National Committee (2025–present)

Party branches

- Essex County Democratic Committee
- Morris County Democratic Committee
- Passaic County Democratic Committee

Labor unions

- Amalgamated Transit Union New Jersey State Council
- American Federation of State, County and Municipal Employees Council 63
- Eastern Atlantic States Regional Council of Carpenters
- International Association of Machinists and Aerospace Workers New Jersey Council
- National Nurses United
- New Jersey AFL-CIO
- New Jersey Education Association
- Retail, Wholesale and Department Store Union
- Teamsters Joint Council 73

Organizations

- BOLD PAC
- Center for Biological Diversity
- Climate Hawks Vote
- Council on American–Islamic Relations Action Fund
- Dear White Staffers
- EMILYs List
- End Citizens United
- Food & Water Action
- Garden State Equality Action Fund
- GrayPac
- Hudson Moms Demand Action
- J Street PAC
- New York Communities for Change
- Patriotic Millionaires
- Peace Action
- Planned Parenthood Action Fund
- Progressive Democrats of America
- UnidosUS Action Fund
Joe Hathaway (R)

Statewide officials

- Chris Christie, former governor of New Jersey (2010–2018)

Party officials

- Christine Hanlon, chairwoman of the New Jersey Republican Party (2026–present)

Party branches

- Morris County Republican Organization
- Passaic County Republican Party

Newspapers

- The New York Post

=== Debates and forums ===
No.	Date	Host	Moderator	Link	Democratic	Republican
Key: P Participant A Absent N Non-invitee I Invitee W Withdrawn						
Key: P Participant A Absent N Non-invitee I Invitee W Withdrawn					Mejia	Hathaway
1	April 1, 2026	New Jersey Globe; The Rebovich Institute for New Jersey Politics at Rider University	Joey Fox	YouTube; C-SPAN	P	P

=== Polling ===
Poll source	Date(s) administered	Sample size	Margin of error	Analilia Mejia (D)	Joe Hathaway (R)	Undecided
GBAO (D) (Note: Poll sponsored by Mejia's campaign)	March 8–10, 2026	500 (LV)	± 4.4%	53%	36%	11%

=== Results ===
2026 New Jersey's 11th congressional district special election
Party	Candidate	Votes	%
Democratic	Analilia Mejia	81,825	60.18
Republican	Joe Hathaway	53,520	39.36
Hope For Tomorrow!	Alan Bond	625	0.46
Total votes		135,970	100.00
Democratic hold			

==== By county ====
County	Analilia Mejia Democratic		Joe Hathaway Republican		Alan Bond Independent		Margin		Total votes cast
County	#	%	#	%	#	%	#	%	Total votes cast
Essex (part)	35,496	71.41%	13,936	28.04%	275	0.55%	21,560	43.37%	49,707
Morris (part)	40,547	54.29%	33,843	45.31%	295	0.39%	6,704	8.98%	74,685
Passaic (part)	5,782	49.94%	5,741	49.59%	55	0.48%	41	0.35%	11,578
Totals	81,825	60.18%	53,520	39.36%	625	0.46%	28,305	20.82%	135,970

== See also ==
- 2026 United States House of Representatives elections
- List of special elections to the United States House of Representatives
- List of United States representatives from New Jersey
- 119th United States Congress

== Notes ==
Partisan clients
