= CIT Vericash =

- Type: Private
- Industry: Fintech
- Founded: 2011
- Founder: Ashraf Zaki
- Headquarters: Toronto, Ontario, Canada
- Area served: Africa, Middle East
- Key people: Ashraf Zaki (Executive Chairman)
- Products: Digital banking, mobile wallet, payment systems, agency banking
- Parent: CIT Global
- Website: www.citvericash.com

CIT VERICASH is a fintech platform and a division of CIT Global, an international eCommerce and mCommerce company based in Toronto, Canada. The company specializes in providing a configurable digital financial services platform to banks, Mobile Money Operators (MMOs), financial institutions, Telecoms, and fintech companies, with a focus on emerging markets across Africa.

== History ==
CIT Global was founded in Toronto in 1993 by Ashraf Zaki. In 2011, the group established the CIT VERICASH fintech enablement division with a mandate to develop and deploy digital financial services infrastructure for institutional clients. In July 2015, the mobile banking application built in partnership with the Vericash platform for United Bank for Africa was first released.

In June 2015 the chief executive of the Nigerian systems integrator Computer Warehouse Group (CWG), Austin Okere, told the company's annual general meeting that its "Mobile Financial Services partnership with CIT Vericash is set to power the mobile financial services of one of the largest banks in Nigeria", with Africa-wide deployment planned. The resulting mobile banking application for United Bank for Africa (UBA), marketed as U-Mobile, carries a 2015 CIT VERICASH copyright notice.

In January 2016, the Nigerian IT company CWG Plc launched the "CWG Vericash Hub", a mobile financial services platform hosted in CWG's Lagos data centre and built on the Vericash software. It also supported U-Mobile, a mobile banking product of United Bank for Africa. As of 2026, the company reported an operational presence in more than 25 markets across the continent.

In 2024 the Kenyan systems integrator Bluechip Technologies appointed a business-development director to lead its CIT VERICASH business in East Africa. In 2024, CIT VERICASH partnered with Bluechip Technologies, a regional systems integrator, to support the rollout of digital banking, mobile wallet, and payment solutions across East Africa.

In 2025, CIT VERICASH and CWG Plc marked ten years of collaboration with United Bank for Africa (UBA), supporting the development and expansion of the bank’s mobile banking platform across African markets.

=== Awards ===
In 2024, CIT VERICASH received the Excellence in Digital Banking Platforms award from Finnovex and the Best Digital Banking Solutions Provider award from the Africa FinTech Forum.

In 2025, it received the Best Digital Transformation Platform and Fintech Strategic Partner of the Year awards from the Africa FinTech Forum, as well as the Best Financial Services Platform Africa 2025 award from Global Financial Market Review.

In 2026, it received the Best Digital Financial Services Platform award from Global Business Outlook.

== Overview ==
CIT VERICASH develops and operates the VERICASH Fintech Enablement Platform, described as a centralized, configurable system designed to support the creation, deployment, and management of digital banking services. The platform is structured as a low-code and no-code environment designed to reduce time-to-market for financial institutions launching digital products. The platform is designed for use across multiple channels, including mobile applications, web interfaces, USSD services, and agent banking networks. Regional operational offices are located in Lagos, Nigeria and Nairobi, Kenya, with an Africa Centre of Excellence headquartered in the Nasr City Free Zone, Cairo, Egypt.

The company also supports international cross-border financial service corridors.

== See also ==
- Digital banking
- Financial inclusion
