= Analilia Mejia =

American activist and politician (born 1977)

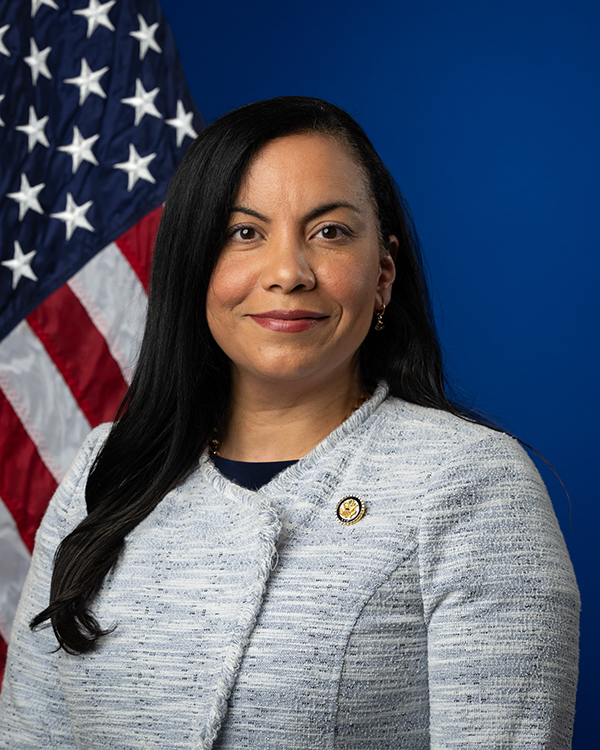
- Official portrait, 2026

Member of the U.S. House of Representatives from New Jersey's 11th district
- Incumbent
- Assumed office April 20, 2026
- Preceded by: Mikie Sherrill

Personal details
- Born: August 19, 1977 (age 49) Elizabeth, New Jersey, U.S.
- Party: Democratic
- Other political affiliations: Working Families
- Spouse: Robert Rogers (m. 2010)
- Children: 2
- Education: Rutgers University, New Brunswick (BA, MPP, MA)
- Occupation: Activist; labor unionist; community organizer; politician
- Website: House website Campaign website

Analilia Mejia (Note: English: /ˌænəˈlɪliə mɛˈhiːə/ AN-ə-LIL-ee-ə meh-HEE-ə; Spanish: Analilia Mejía [anaˈlilja meˈxi.a].) (born August 19, 1977) is an American politician and activist serving as the U.S. representative for New Jersey's 11th congressional district since April 2026. The co-director of the nonprofit progressive advocacy group Center for Popular Democracy, she was the national political director for Bernie Sanders's 2020 presidential campaign and served in the United States Department of Labor during the Biden administration. Mejia was the Democratic nominee in the 2026 special election for New Jersey's 11th congressional district, running for Mikie Sherrill's seat, defeating Republican nominee Joe Hathaway, a Randolph councilmember. She faced Hathaway again in the November 2026 elections and won.

== Early life and education ==
Mejia was born and raised in Elizabeth, New Jersey, to a mother from Colombia and a father from the Dominican Republic. Her father worked in a sewing machine factory and her mother in a garment factory; her mother was initially undocumented. During Mejia's childhood, the family experienced poverty before her mother obtained a union-affiliated factory job in New York, which Mejia later said improved the family's economic security.

Mejia earned an undergraduate degree in comparative literature in 2000, a Master of Public Policy from the Edward J. Bloustein School of Planning and Public Policy in 2002, and a master's in labor relations and education from the School of Management and Labor Relations in 2003, all at Rutgers University–New Brunswick.

== Career ==
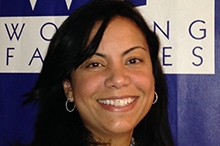
Mejia in 2009

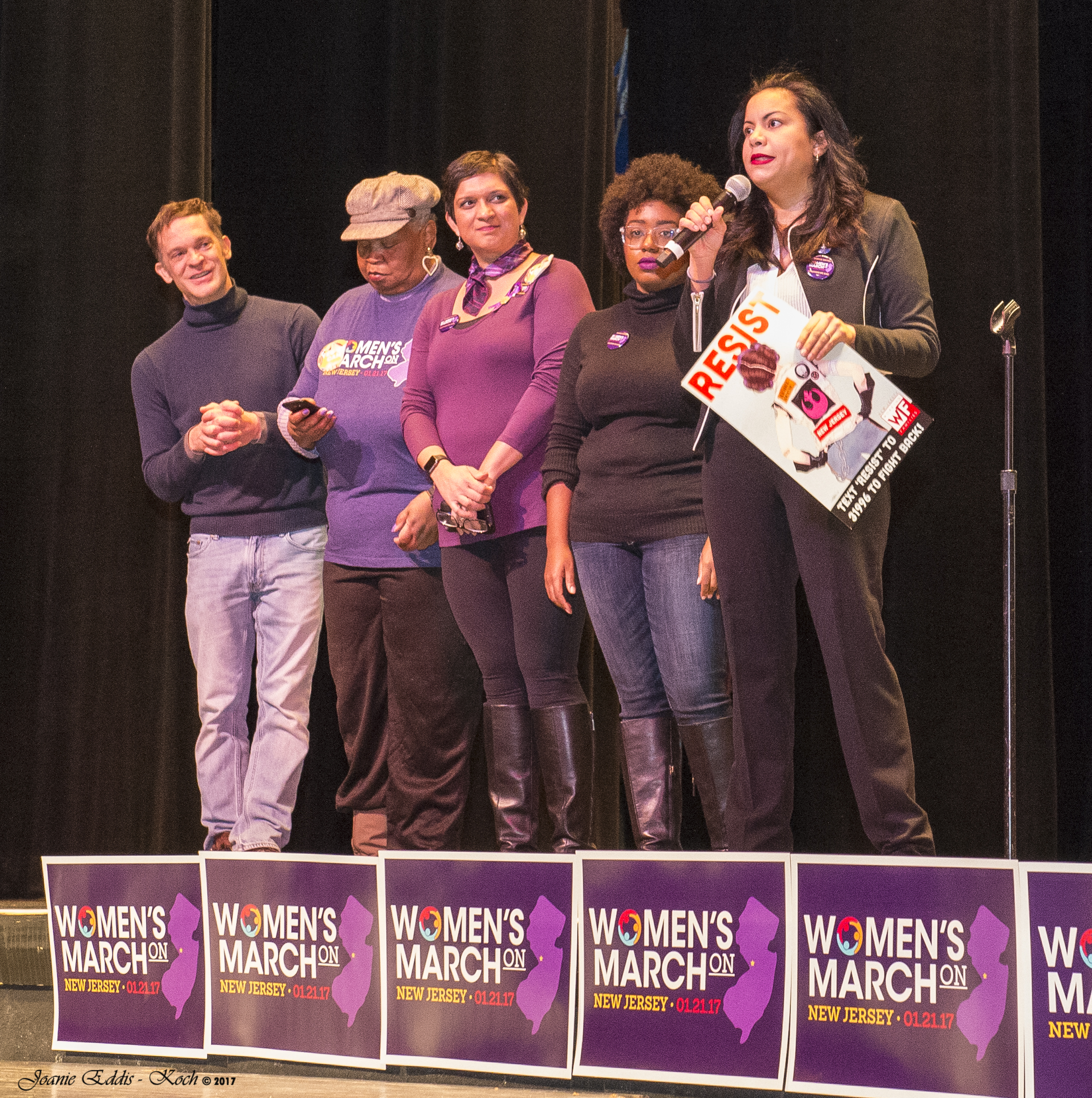
Mejia (right) speaking during the Women's March on New Jersey in 2017

Mejia worked as an organizer with the United Food and Commercial Workers, served as political director of SEIU Local 32BJ, Hotel Employees and Restaurant Employees Union, and as assistant political director at UNITE HERE in Chicago.

In the 2012 United States Senate election in New Jersey, Mejia was the Latino/Labor Vote Director for incumbent Bob Menendez's campaign. Starting in 2014, she was executive director of the New Jersey Working Families Alliance, an affiliate of the Working Families Party. In the 2016 Democratic presidential primary, Mejia was a delegate for Sanders. In 2019, she left the New Jersey Working Families Alliance to serve as national political director for Sanders's 2020 presidential campaign.

Mejia was appointed deputy director of the United States Women's Bureau at the U.S. Department of Labor during the Joe Biden administration. She is currently co-executive director of the Center for Popular Democracy.

=== U.S. House of Representatives ===
==== Elections ====
===== 2026 special =====
On November 25, 2025, Mejia announced her candidacy for the special election in New Jersey's 11th congressional district after Mikie Sherrill, the incumbent, was elected governor of New Jersey. She and 10 other candidates, including former U.S. representative Tom Malinowski and former lieutenant governor Tahesha Way, ran in the Democratic primary. Mejia ran as a progressive, with endorsements from U.S. Senators Bernie Sanders and Elizabeth Warren and U.S. Representative Alexandria Ocasio-Cortez. During the primary, she spoke at a rally in Wayne, New Jersey, as part of Sanders's Fighting Oligarchy tour.

On election night, February 5, 2026, Decision Desk HQ and the New Jersey Globe called the election for Malinowski, who was leading in the counted votes, but both retracted their calls after Mejia surpassed Malinowski later that night. On February 10, Malinowski conceded, though no major news outlet had yet called the race. Later that day, CNN called the race for Mejia. The Associated Press declared Mejia the winner on February 12.

In the general election on April 16, Mejia defeated the Republican nominee, Randolph councilman Joe Hathaway, by 20 percentage points. She was sworn in on April 20. She was appointed to the House Committee on Homeland Security and House Committee on Small Business.

== Political positions ==
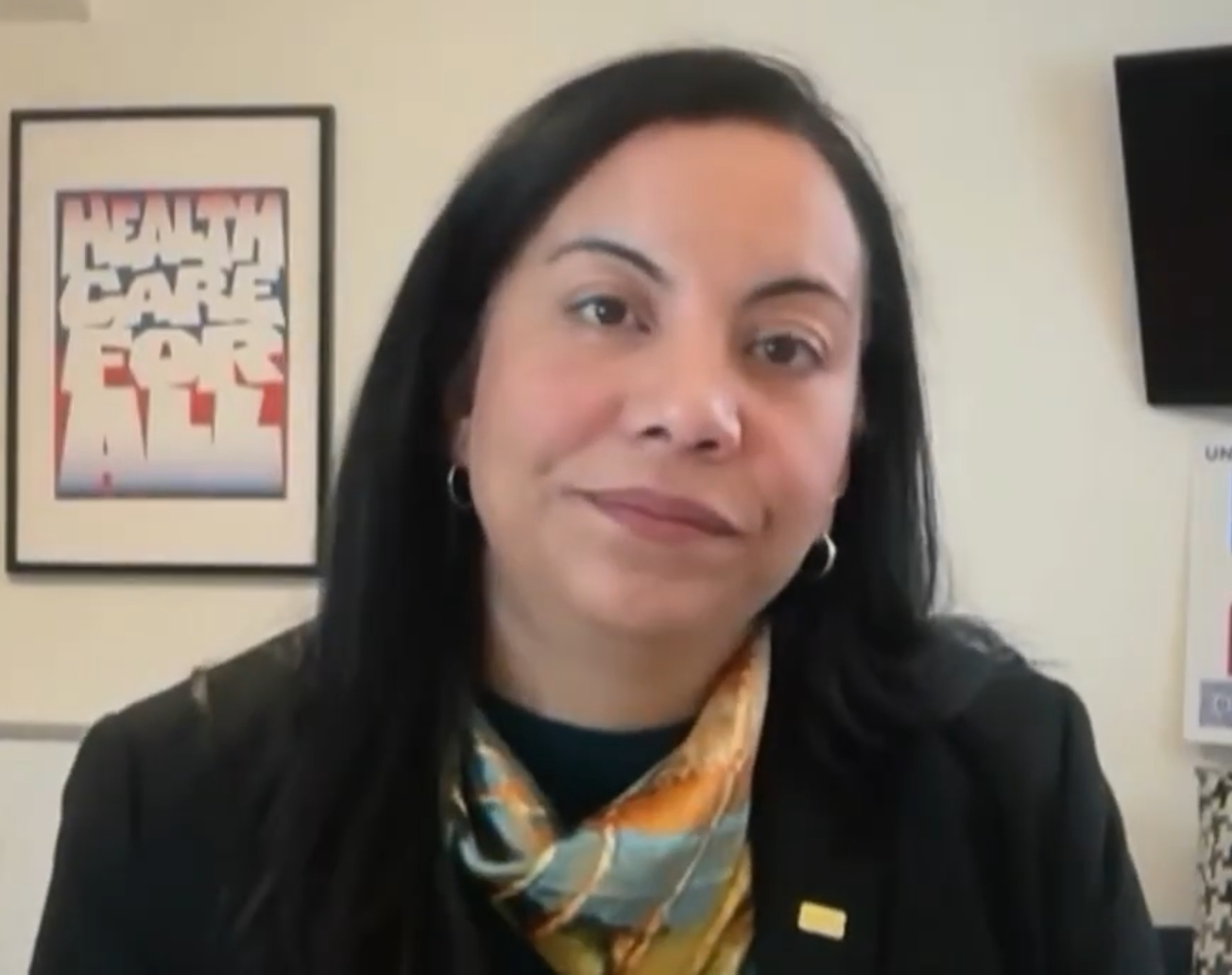
Mejia interviewed by Democracy Now! in February 2026

Mejia supports Medicare for All, tuition-free public college, student loan forgiveness, the PRO Act, strengthening unions and expanding labor protections, a nationwide $25 minimum wage, affordable housing, tenant protections, and regulation of AI data centers and Big Tech companies.

During the 2026 special-primary campaign, Mejia said that voters responded to her message on affordability and United States Immigration and Customs Enforcement (ICE). She has called for the abolition of ICE and resistance to what she has called "rising authoritarianism". She has said she believes Israel is committing genocide in Gaza.

== Personal life ==
Mejia married Robert E. Rogers Jr. on June 26, 2010, in Newark, New Jersey. As of April 2026, the couple, their two sons, and her parents have lived in Glen Ridge, New Jersey for at least seven years. Mejia is Lutheran and a member of St. Stephan's ELCA Church.

== Electoral history ==
2026 New Jersey's 11th congressional district special election, Democratic primary results
Party	Candidate	Votes	%
Democratic	Analilia Mejia	19,789	29.33
Democratic	Tom Malinowski	18,603	27.57
Democratic	Tahesha Way	11,737	17.40
Democratic	Brendan Gill	9,556	14.16
Democratic	John Bartlett	1,825	2.71
Democratic	Justin Strickland	1,391	2.06
Democratic	Jeff Grayzel	1,311	1.94
Democratic	Zach Beecher	1,310	1.94
Democratic	Cammie Croft	719	1.07
Democratic	Anna Lee Williams	528	0.78
Democratic	J-L Cauvin	293	0.43
Democratic	Dean Dafis (withdrawn)	280	0.42
Democratic	Marc Chaaban (withdrawn)	123	0.18
Total votes		67,465	100.00

2026 New Jersey's 11th congressional district special election, General election results
Party	Candidate	Votes	%
Democratic	Analilia Mejia	81,494	60.14
Republican	Joe Hathaway	53,385	39.40
Hope For Tomorrow! (Note: Not a political party, independent candidates are allowed to choose a ballot label in New Jersey.)	Alan Bond	624	0.46
Total votes		135,503	100.0
Democratic hold			

2026 New Jersey's 11th congressional district Democratic primary
Party	Candidate	Votes	%
Democratic	Analilia Mejia (incumbent)	52,908	81.7
Democratic	Donald Cresitello	4,443	6.9
Democratic	Justin Strickland	3,929	6.1
Democratic	Joseph Lewis	3,507	5.4
Total votes		64,787	100.0

== Notes ==
U.S. House of Representatives
Preceded by Mikie Sherrill	Member of the U.S. House of Representatives from New Jersey's 11th congressional district 2026–present	Incumbent
U.S. order of precedence (ceremonial)
Preceded by Clay Fuller	United States representatives by seniority 430th	Succeeded by James Gallagher
