= Congressional Workers Union =

American labor union

- Abbreviation: CWU
- Formation: 2022
- Type: Trade union
- Headquarters: Washington, DC, US
- Location: United States
- Website: congressionalworkersunion.org

The Congressional Workers Union (CWU) is an American labor union that represents Congressional staffers in both individual US Representatives' and Senators' offices as well as committee staff.

== Background ==
A 2020 study found that one in eight staffers were not making a living wage; others said they were relying on food stamps or working second jobs. A 2022 survey conducted by the Congressional Progressive Staff Association had 86 percent of non-management staff and 80 percent of management staff say they felt there was a "toxic work environment in Congress" and 91 percent of respondents said they wanted "more protections to give [them] a voice at work”.

Other issues with working conditions, including bullying and racism, were publicized by an anonymous Instagram account named Dear White Staffers.

The Congressional Accountability Act of 1995 was supposed to extend labor rights to Congressional staff, but Congress never authorized the regulations that would have implemented legal protections for organizing.

== Formation ==
In the weeks following the January 6 United States Capitol attack, multiple staffers had a call to discuss formally creating a union, with one person participating from a bathroom stall in the Rayburn House Office Building.

In February 2022, Speaker Nancy Pelosi said she supported Congressional staff having the right to organize, which led to CWU organizers going public with their efforts. The CWU began discussing with Representative Andy Levin to introduced a resolution protecting House staffers' right to organize by implementing the regulations from the Congressional Accountability Act, which he did a week later.

The House Administration Committee held a hearing on the resolution in March, the full House passed it 217–202 in May. It went into effect on July 18, 2022; the CWU announced eight House offices had filed petitions for a union the same day.

== US House ==
The following offices voted to form a union:

- Sean Casten (Illinois)
- Chuy García (Illinois)
- Val Hoyle (Oregon)
- Ro Khanna (California)
- Andy Levin (Michigan)
- Ted Lieu (California)
- Alexandria Ocasio-Cortez (New York)
- Mark Pocan (Wisconsin)
- Ilhan Omar (Minnesota)
- Melanie Stansbury (New Mexico)
- Mark Takano (California)
- Dina Titus (Nevada)

Former offices:

- Cori Bush (Missouri)

All thirteen house offices who have voted to form a Union are offices of representatives of the Democratic Party.

The staff on the Committee on Education and the Workforce also filed a petition to unionize. Levin's staff was the first to organize and negotiate a contract in October 2022, but it was only in effect for two months since he lost his re-election bid.

== US Senate ==
The resolution passed in the House does not protect Senate staffers from retaliation for organizing, so the CWU sent a letter to Senate leaders in February 2023, asking them to pass the same regulations from the Congressional Accountability Act. Senator Sherrod Brown introduced such a resolution in June.

In March 2023, Senator Ed Markey voluntarily recognized a union formed by his staff.

== See also ==
- Campaign Workers Guild
