= Congressional staff =

Employees of a Congress or its members

Congressional staff are employees of a legislative congress who support legislators in their duties. They handle a variety of tasks, which may include policy research, constituent services, communications, and administrative support. Staffers may work with individual members of a congress, or they may be associated with committees or ancillary departments that provide support for a congress.

== United States ==
=== History ===
Before the American Civil War, members of the United States Congress did not have staff assistance or even offices, and "most members worked at their desks on the floor."

In 1891, Congress had a total of 146 staff members: 37 Senate personal staff, 39 Senate committee staff, and 62 House committee staff (37 of whom only worked during congressional sessions). The House first approved personal staff for Representatives in 1893. By the beginning of the 20th century, congressional staff had become a well-accepted feature of congressional operations.

In 1943, House committees employed 114 staff members, while Senate committees employed 190 staff members. The size of individual members' personal staffs were still relatively small, with the average senator having six staffers and representatives limited to having five staffers. In the Legislative Reorganization Act of 1946, which reformed Congress and greatly reduced the number of congressional committees, Congress expressly authorized permanent, professional committee staff for the first time. The act provided for a much-needed increase in committee staff, allowing for up to four professional and six clerical staff members for each standing committee, except for the appropriations committees (which had no limitation on the number of staff members). The 1946 act also reorganized the Library of Congress and created the Legislative Reference Service (which later became the Congressional Research Service) as a distinct entity. The size of both personal and committee staff increased considerably after the passage of the Legislative Reorganization Act. Following the significant increase in 1947, there was gradual growth in the number of both kinds of staff for about twenty years. Increased staff specialization also occurred during this period of slow growth (i.e., staffers began to be divided into press, legislative, and casework roles).

In the 1970s, there was again a sharp jump in the number of staff. This was a response "in part to increased workloads and in part to confrontation with the executive branch on various issues, including the president's impoundment of funds and the Watergate crisis." The political scientist Morris P. Fiorina, in his book Congress: Keystone of the Washington Establishment, found that the number of congressional staff more than doubled between 1960 and 1974. The increase was mostly in district or state offices; the percentage of congressional staff who worked in a district office went from 14% in 1960 to 34% in 1974.

In the 1970s and 1990s, "staff numbers generally held level and increases were held down. After 1995, staff numbers actually decreased slightly."

In 2021 a group of staffers called Congressional Progressive Staff Association sought to push for workplace measures and with the support of Representative Andy Levin make incremental reforms. In 2022 and 2023, multiple House offices and one Senate office voted to unionize with the Congressional Workers Union.

=== Structure and organization ===
Staff for the United States Congress are generally divided, as C-SPAN describes, into personal staff (working directly for individual members) and committee staff (serving legislative committees). There are also leadership staff who assist party leaders in managing legislative priorities.

- Personal staff, who work for individual members of Congress
- Committee staff, who serve either the majority or minority on congressional committees
- Leadership staff, who work for the speaker, majority and minority leaders, and majority and minority whips in the House of Representatives, and the majority and minority leaders and assistant majority and minority leaders (whips) in the Senate
- Institutional staff, including majority or minority party floor staff and non-partisan staff such as the Capitol Police, Architect of the Capitol (facilities and maintenance employees), and legislative clerks.
- Support agency staff, non-partisan employees of the Congressional Research Service (CRS), Congressional Budget Office (CBO), and Government Accountability Office (GAO).

In the year 2000, there were approximately 11,692 personal staff, 2,492 committee staff, 274 leadership staff, 5,034 institutional staff, and 3,500 GAO employees, 747 CRS employees, and 232 CBO employees.

=== Personal staff ===
Budgets for staff are determined by the population of the state; Senators from California, the most populous state, get more money for staff than Senators from Wyoming, the least populous state. Members can choose how to distribute staff between their Washington office and their United States congressional district home office or offices.

Not all offices have the same type of organization, and different titles may be used for substantially similar jobs. Common jobs are:

- Chief of staff: Highest-ranking and usually highest-paid legislative staffer in the office of a member of Congress, usually the chief operating officer of the office, reporting directly to the member. Oversees a dozen or more other employees. Some chiefs of staffs are charged with personnel decisions and policy initiatives. From time to time a chief of staff may be based out of a district office, but they are almost always found at the Capitol ("on the "Hill"). Chiefs of staff are usually very experienced political staffers, often with years of prior work on the Hill, or are personal friends of Members. Some chiefs of staff were previously campaign managers.
- Deputy chief of staff: Reports to the chief of staff and typically oversees a few policy issues. Responsibilities typically include managing the Chief of Staff’s schedule, personal correspondence, and any overflow work delegated by the Chief of Staff.
- Legislative director (LD), senior legislative assistant (SLA), or legislative coordinator (LC): oversees the legislative staff, including all legislative assistants and correspondents. There is usually one in each office.
- Scheduler or Director of Operations: The key administrative staffer in the office, the scheduler is responsible for fully designing and maintaining the Member's schedule. This work typically includes making travel arrangements and arranging all events and meetings.
- Legislative assistant (LA): Legislative Assistants assume expertise and develop legislation for a few select issue areas, keeping the Member up to date on constituent issues or policies that pertain to those subject areas.
- Legislative correspondent (LC): Responsible for drafting letters in response to constituents' comments and questions and also generally responsible for a few legislative issues. According to the Dirksen Congressional Center, most House offices have one or two, while senators have three to five, depending on their state's population.
- Legislative counsel: Some offices also have a staffing attorney who works alongside legislative staff. Their role often involves advising legislative staff and the Member on legal issues and ensuring compliance with the law and chamber rules, including ethics guidelines.
- Press secretary or communications director: Responsible for Member's relationship with media; is the liaison for the local and national press; issues press releases. In offices with no press assistants, this position also runs social media.
- Press Assistant (PA): Assistant to the Communications Director. Press assistants usually run social media accounts, draft press releases/op-eds/etc. as delegated, and occasionally assist with correspondence with media contacts.
- Staff Assistant (SA): The most common entry-level position on Capitol Hill, the Staff Assistant handles all front office responsibilities, answers phones, schedules tours, and often supervises the mail program. Staff Assistants also often serve as intern coordinators.
- Caseworkers or constituent services representatives: Based in the district office and responsible for helping constituents deal with problems relating to federal agencies. For example, caseworkers help individuals secure veterans' benefits, aid with Social Security and Medicare, and resolve immigration issues. Caseworkers may also provide mediation services to constituents and obtain government information and publications.

=== Committee staff ===
Each congressional committee has a staff, of varying sizes. Appropriations for committee staff are made in annual legislative appropriations bills. Majority and minority members hire their own staff except on two select committees in each house—the Committee on Ethics and Permanent Select Committee on Intelligence in the House and the Select Committee on Ethics and Senate Select Committee on Intelligence in the Senate. These committees have a single staff.

In 2000, House committees had an average of 68 staff and Senate committees an average of 46. Committee staff includes both staff directors, committee counsel, committee investigators, press secretaries, chief clerks and office managers, schedulers, documents clerks, and assistant.

=== Safety and security ===
Like members of Congress, congressional staff have occasionally been the targets of violence or threats of violence. Between 1789 and 2011, there were five incidents affecting some congressional staff alongside members of Congress. The following recorded incidents of violence against congressional staff have taken place:

- In 1905, "Doc" Thompkins, private secretary to Representative John M. Pinckney of Texas, was wounded in a riot in which the congressman was slain.
- In 1935, Earle Christenberry, secretary to Senator Huey Pierce Long of Louisiana, opened a parcel bomb (which did not detonate).
- In 1978, Jackie Speier, then a staffer for Representative Leo Joseph Ryan of California, was seriously injured by a gunshot wound in an attack in Guyana, in which Ryan was assassinated.
- 1998 United States Capitol shooting incident: In 1998, two Capitol Police officers were killed by a gunman.
- 2011 Tucson shooting: In 2011, a gunman Jared Lee Loughner attacked a public event being held by Representative Gabrielle Giffords of Arizona in Tucson. Six people were killed, including Gabriel Matthew Zimmerman, a member of Gifford's staff. Thirteen others were injured, including Giffords and two of her staff members, Ron Barber and Pamela Simon.
- Congressional baseball shooting: In 2017, a gunman attacked Republican congressmen and others who were practicing in Alexandria, Virginia, for the Congressional Baseball Game. House Majority Whip Steve Scalise and several others were wounded, including two Capitol Police officers; a staff member for Representative Roger Williams; and a former congressional staff member and lobbyist.

== See also ==
- Constituent services in the United States
