= Legislative correspondent =

A legislative correspondent is a position in the congressional staff employed by members of the United States Congress that is chiefly responsible for drafting constituent form letters and memoranda, tracking legislation, conducting legislative research, and meeting constituent and interest groups. They tend to work alongside legislative assistants or eventually get promoted to positions such as legislative assistant or legislative director.

In organizations that conduct lobbying (government relations) activities, especially among advocacy groups and political action comities, exact counterparts with the same or similar titles -- such as legislative correspondent, staff assistant, or legislative coordinator -- exist; in these roles, government relations or policy and advocacy staff participate in administrative, legislative, and outreach duties such as drafting letters, conducting briefings and scheduling advocacy or constituent meetings with congressional staff and work as liaisons or principals when introducing likeminded constituent-advocates to their congress member or senator’s staff.

As of 2019, the average pay of a legislative correspondent was $45,457.

Notable People

Notable former legislative correspondents include Jon Ossoff, Ben Cline, Joshua DuBois, and Stacey Plaskett..
