= Dear White Staffers =

American Instagram account

- Profile photo of Dear White Staffers

Instagram information
- Page: Dear White Staffers
- Years active: 2020–present
- Followers: 382,000 (December 1, 2025)

Dear White Staffers is an anonymous Instagram account that documents instances of alleged poor behavior by sitting members of the United States Congress, in their capacity as employers of congressional staff. The account was created in 2020, primarily to post memes about being a person of color in the disproportionately white environment of congressional staffing. Two years later, however, a single thread shifted the account's focus towards documenting poor treatment of congressional staffers in general, and significantly increased the popularity of the account overall.

Aides face a significant number of challenges in performing their jobs, including long days, poor pay, a lack of diversity, and – as is frequently covered by the account – workplace bigotry and poor treatment by higher-ups. Dear White Staffers frequently facilitates "vibe checks" on incumbent lawmakers, inviting the reposting of crowd-sourced and unverified anecdotes from congressional aides who send anonymous messages to the account.

The content on Dear White Staffers has been described as gossip, and frequently remains unconfirmed by independent fact-checkers. Despite the unverifiability of any one case, the account has received praise for bringing attention to the plight of congressional staffers in general, a conversation that resulted in some staffers moving to form unions. Dear White Staffers is claimed to be closely watched by high-level congressional staff and even sitting representatives.

== Background and history ==
Dear White Staffers is run anonymously, although Politico identifies the manager as male, and he identifies himself as a person of color who worked on Capitol Hill as of April 2022. He also goes to substantial lengths to protect his anonymity, clearing out his camera roll daily and not revealing his connection with the account to anyone in his life except his partner.

In 2024, Jewish Insider identified a staffer for Democratic Congresswoman Summer Lee as behind the account. The staffer previously worked for Ilhan Omar, Earl Blumenauer, and Julia Brownley. Following the October 7 attacks on October 7, 2023, the staffer shared an Instagram post on their personal account featuring a poster from the Popular Front for the Liberation of Palestine, a Palestinian faction designated as a terror-group by the US government. Several Democratic staffers described Dear White Staffer's identity as an open secret among a growing number of Hill staff in March 2024.

=== 2020–2022: Meme account ===
The account was created primarily to post memes, seeking to document the experiences of being a person of color in the disproportionately white environment of congressional staffing. In covering Dear White Staffers, The Bulwark highlighted a 2020 report from the Joint Center for Political and Economic Studies, which noted several racial disparities in Capitol Hill staffing: black Americans comprised just 3% of senior-level Senate staffers and 2% of the Senate offices' chiefs of staff despite comprising 13% of the U.S. population, and people of color made up just 10% of senior-level Senate staffers despite making up 40% of the U.S. population. The manager of Dear White Staffers recounted to Politico that he has been confused for a valet attendant when taking part in congressional events with his employer, and has been treated differently than white staffers by the Capitol Police. Some staffers of color say that formal channels of complaint are not responsive to them for some negative experiences, such as frequent microaggressions.

There is some disparity between Republican and Democratic Party congressional offices in the matter of hiring staffers of color – writing for The Bulwark, Jim Swift attributes more of the blame in racial hiring disparities to Republicans, pinning most of the effect to the fact that Republicans are simply less likely to be black. Democratic offices (at least in theory) have an informal "Rooney rule", which stipulates that at least one candidate of color should be considered for each position; Republicans do not have a similar rule.

Dear White Staffers' first post was on January 30, 2020, depicting an image of a person putting on clown shoes; it was captioned "getting ready to get off at Cap South to make less than my white male counterparts". The account's name is a reference to Dear White People, a film and later a Netflix series about black students at a fictional university in the Ivy League. The memes continued for a couple of years; Dear White Staffers gained little traction until January 2022, when it was prompted to "get a thread going of horror stories driving your member of Congress around". The account's request for stories from its followers garnered a significant number of responses, which were reposted to Dear White Staffers under the condition of anonymity.

=== 2022–2023: Platform for congressional staff ===
By the end of January 2022, the account's role had expanded to documenting the perceived poor treatment of congressional aides in general. Among their grievances, aides cite overwork, low pay, a toxic and sometimes discriminatory workplace culture, and a continued lack of staff diversity, with an increasingly low ability to influence public policy at all. One aide testified to an informal "code of silence" around workplace quality, further commenting: "if you don’t like your boss, you leave and go to another office".

According to a House Office of Diversity and Inclusion report from July 2021, entry-level staffers can make as little as $30,000, with a median average of $59,000. A 2022 report from Issue One found that 13% of congressional aides based in the U.S. capital were not paid a living wage, and entry-level staff only made 70% of the national average salary in 2020. Some aides have reported to Dear White Staffers that they need food stamps and subsidized housing to make ends meet.

Dear White Staffers frequently facilitates "vibe checks" on incumbent lawmakers; by user request, the account will put out a call for accounts of work life at a specific congressional office. The vibe check is an overall assessment of the experience of the office: workplace culture, employer behavior, work intensity, hour length, and pay. Direct messages will then be sent to Dear White Staffers by followers of the account; reports vary widely, from the generally positive to accounts of emotional and verbal abuse.

The anonymous content published by Dear White Staffers has been described as gossip; Politico referred to the stories reposted by the account as "unfiltered" and "unvetted", and The Washington Post said that it was unable to independently corroborate allegations made against lawmakers. Changing course, however, was a significant boon for the account's popularity; before the "horror stories" thread, the account had not broken 8,000 followers. After the end of January, the account swelled to 20,000 followers, in part thanks to attention to the account given by fellow Instagram account DeuxMoi, which publishes celebrity gossip. By mid-July, Dear White Staffers had 91,000 followers.

=== 2023–present: Activism ===
Following the October 7 attacks, 2023, the account evolved primarily into a single-issue advocacy page, becoming a prominent and vocal pro-Palestine and anti-Israel platform. Since October 7, posts on the account accused Israel of genocide in Gaza, condemned the Biden Administration and Congress for continuing to provide aid to Israel, attacked AIPAC's influence on American politics, and opposed the U.S. campaign against the Houthis in Yemen. Mother Jones argued that the account had posted some (unverified) stories of discontent among progressive staffers regarding the Biden administration's support for Israel. A post valorizing the self-immolation of Aaron Bushnell drew criticism from Congressman Ritchie Torres. Jewish staffers pointed to the Dear White Staffers account as contributing to an increasingly hostile workplace since October 7 and described the posts as "borderline or openly antisemitic". Despite these criticisms, the page has found common cause with the more than one hundred congressional staffers who participated in a walkout demanding a ceasefire in Gaza and the more than four hundred executive branch staffers who published an open letter calling for the same, both in November, 2023.

== Reactions and impact ==
Though commentators acknowledged the unverifiable nature of Dear White Staffers' vibe checks, the account is nonetheless credited with bringing attention to the generally poor working conditions and unfulfilling labor endured by some congressional aides. Jim Swift says of Dear White Staffers' content, "I am here for it. It’s provoking a conversation that Congress really needs to be having, and the account is roaringly funny." The conversation credited to Dear White Staffers resulted in a unionization movement among congressional staffers, which was supported by Speaker Nancy Pelosi and Representative Alexandria Ocasio-Cortez.

The account has attracted the interest and ire of representatives and their staffers, both junior and senior. Aides read the account as a form of catharsis, to watch for unfair accusations of poor treatment against their bosses, or both. According to aides who send direct messages to Dear White Staffers, their bosses are scrutinizing the information that flows on the account; the manager suspects that several specific members of Congress are followers of his through pseudonymous accounts. In an interview with Politico, he recounts a particular story in which he received word that the staffers in Nancy Pelosi's office were discussing a "vibe check" request on her, sent to Dear White Staffers. In particular, he was told that Pelosi's chief of staff made several phone calls to staff addressing the matter. He remarks, "I was like, holy shit. This is reaching her office. Like, this is in Nancy's office."
