= Mikie Sherrill =

Governor of New Jersey since 2026

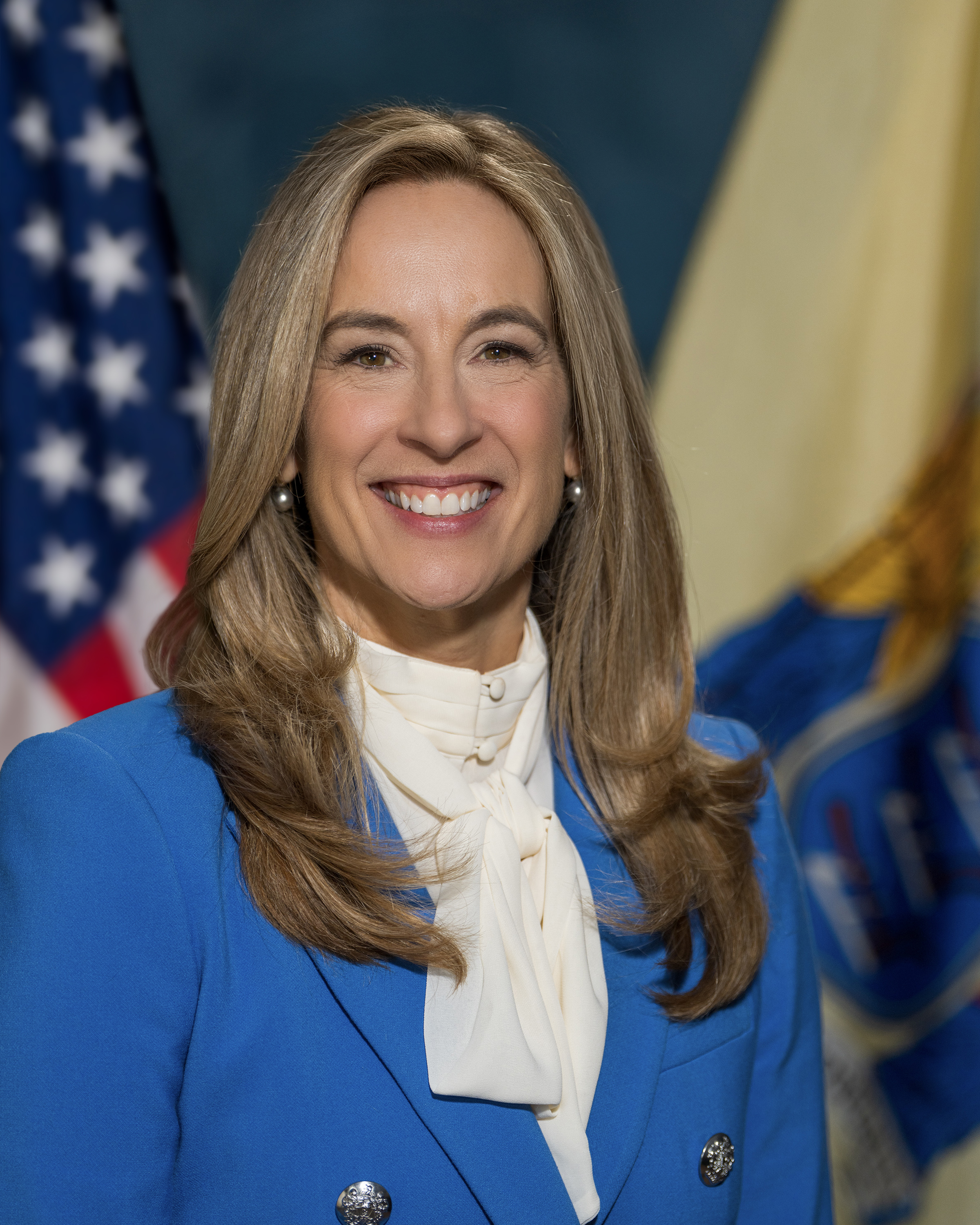
- Official portrait, 2026

57th Governor of New Jersey
- Incumbent
- Assumed office January 20, 2026
- Lieutenant: Dale Caldwell; Shirley Emehelu
- Preceded by: Phil Murphy

Member of the U.S. House of Representatives from New Jersey's 11th district
- In office January 3, 2019 – November 20, 2025
- Preceded by: Rodney Frelinghuysen
- Succeeded by: Analilia Mejia

Personal details
- Born: Rebecca Michelle Sherrill; January 19, 1972 (age 54) Alexandria, Virginia, U.S.
- Party: Democratic
- Spouse: Jason Hedberg (m. 2005)
- Children: 4
- Education: United States Naval Academy (BS); London School of Economics (MSc); Georgetown University (JD)
- Website: Official website Campaign website

Military service
- Allegiance: United States
- Branch: United States Navy
- Service years: 1994–2003
- Rank: Lieutenant
- Unit: Naval aviation

Rebecca Michelle "Mikie" Sherrill (/ˈmaɪki ˈʃɛrəl/ MY-kee SHERR-əl; born January 19, 1972) is an American politician, former naval officer, and former federal prosecutor serving since 2026 as the 57th governor of New Jersey. She is a member of the Democratic Party.

Sherrill was first elected to office in 2018, winning the election for New Jersey's 11th congressional district in the U.S. House of Representatives. She was reelected in 2020, 2022, and 2024. She was elected governor in 2025.

Sherrill is New Jersey's second female governor (after Christine Todd Whitman) and first female Democratic governor, as well as the first female military veteran to be elected governor of any U.S. state.

== Early life and college ==
Sherrill was born in Alexandria, Virginia. She grew up in various places along the East Coast due to her father's job.

Sherrill attended South Lakes High School in Reston, Virginia, from 1986 to 1990, participating in the school's marching band. In 1994, she earned her Bachelor of Science from the United States Naval Academy in Annapolis, Maryland.

== Military career ==
Inspired by her grandfather who served as a pilot in World War II, Sherrill wanted to be a pilot from an early age. She was among the flight school graduates in the first class of women eligible for direct assignment to fly combat aircraft. Sherrill graduated from the Naval Academy in 1994 but was barred from walking at her commencement ceremony after receiving disciplinary action in the wake of the Naval Academy cheating scandal.

She later completed over a year of flight training, was designated as a Naval Aviator after graduation from the advanced rotary-wing training pipeline at NAS Whiting Field, Florida, and became a U.S. Navy helicopter pilot, flying the H-3 Sea King. Sherrill flew missions throughout Europe and in the Middle East. In 2000, she was based at Naval Air Station Corpus Christi, Texas.

Following her first operational sea duty assignment in a flying squadron, Sherrill was a Russian policy officer assigned to the then-Headquarters, Commander-in-Chief, U.S. Naval Forces Europe (CINCUSNAVEUR).

Sherrill served on active duty in the U.S. Navy for nine years, the last five with the rank of lieutenant.

== Law career ==
In 2003, Sherrill received an MSc in international and world history from the London School of Economics. In 2004, she received a certificate in Arabic language from the American University in Cairo. In 2007, Sherrill earned a Juris Doctor from the Georgetown University Law Center.

In mid-2007, while earning her Juris Doctor degree from Georgetown University Law Center, Sherrill was a summer associate at Kirkland & Ellis. After graduation from Georgetown University Law Center, Sherrill returned to Kirkland & Ellis's New York City office, where she worked in the litigation department from 2008 to 2011.

After leaving Kirkland & Ellis, Sherrill joined the United States Attorney's Office as an outreach and reentry coordinator. In 2015, Sherrill became a federal prosecutor, as an assistant United States attorney for the District of New Jersey, working under U.S. Attorney Paul Fishman. She left that office in 2016. At the time, she planned on going into the field of criminal justice reform.

== U.S. House of Representatives ==
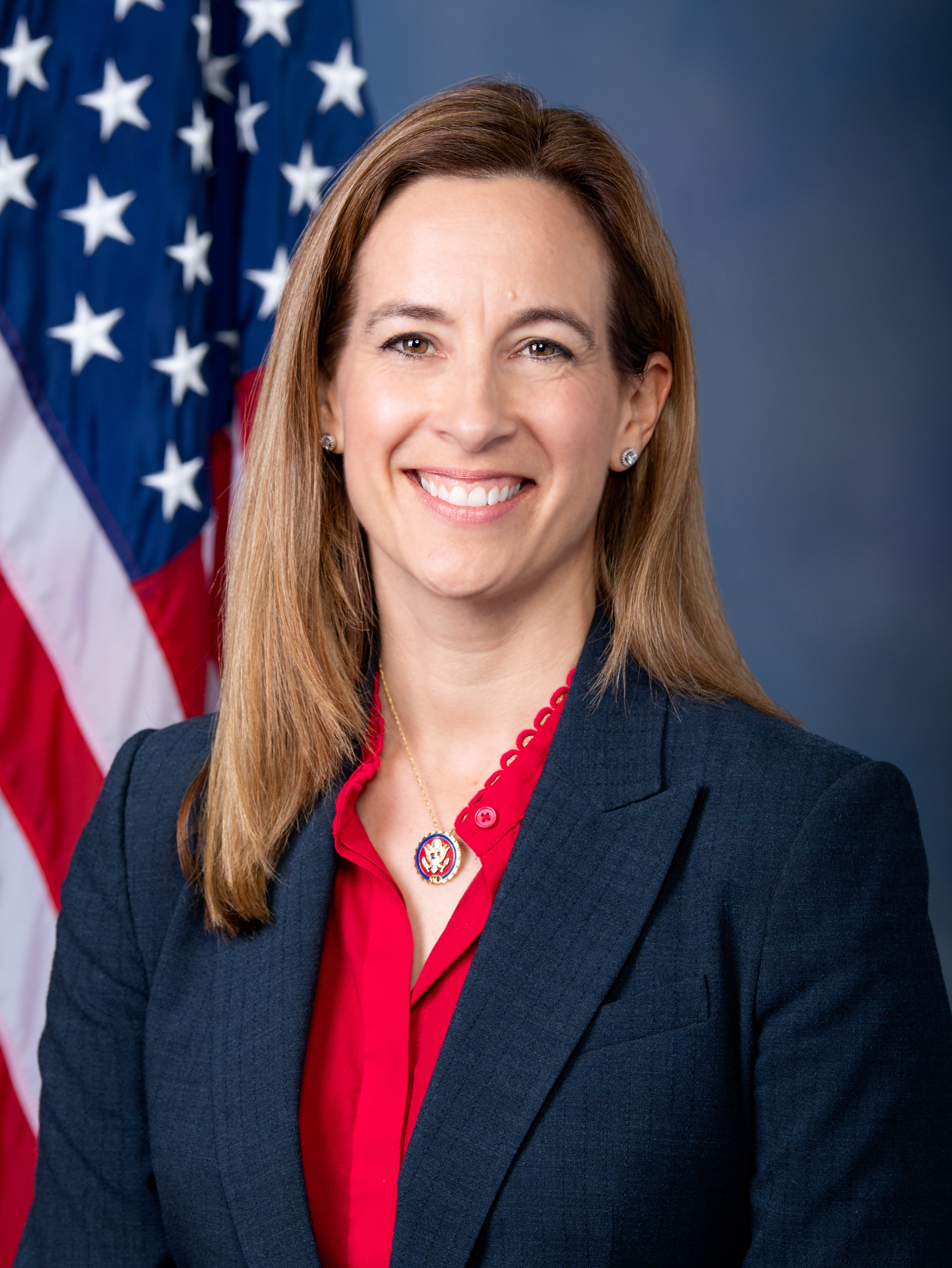
Sherrill during the 116th Congress

=== Elections ===
==== 2018 ====
On May 11, 2017, Sherrill launched her campaign for New Jersey's 11th congressional district in the United States House of Representatives. The seat had been held by 12-term Republican incumbent Rodney Frelinghuysen, the chairman of the House Appropriations Committee, who in January 2018 announced he would not seek reelection. The district had long been considered a Republican stronghold, even after redistricting had moved slightly more Democratic voters in Essex County, including a slice of Montclair around Sherrill's home. Frelinghuysen had been reelected three more times in this redrawn district without serious difficulty, but it was thought to be vulnerable to a Democrat after Donald Trump carried it by only one percentage point in 2016.

In November 2017, comedian Chelsea Handler, who is from Livingston, went to Montclair to support Sherrill's campaign. Sherrill was endorsed by the political action committee organization VoteVets.org, the pro-choice Democratic PAC EMILY's List, the editorial board of The New York Times, and the New Jersey chapter of Clean Water Action.

In June 2018, Sherrill won the Democratic primary with 77% of the vote, beating four other candidates. Sherrill raised $2.8 million during the primary election, placing her among the top House fundraisers in the country. Her campaign raised $1.9 million in the second quarter of 2018, setting a record for a House candidate from New Jersey in one quarter.

On November 6, Sherrill won 56.8% of the vote, defeating Republican state assemblyman Jay Webber with 42.1%. The election marked the largest partisan swing in the 2018 cycle, a 33-point swing from a 19-point Republican margin in 2016 to a 15-point Democratic one in 2018. Sherrill is the first Democrat to win this seat since 16-term incumbent Joseph Minish was defeated in 1984 after the district had been redrawn to be more Republican. She was the first Democrat since Minish's defeat to win more than 40% of the district's vote.

==== 2020 ====
Sherrill had a closer contest for reelection in 2020, defeating Republican tax lawyer Rosemary Becchi, 53.3% to 46.7%. That year Joe Biden became the first Democratic presidential candidate to win the 11th district since it assumed its present configuration in 1984, carrying the district with 52.7% of the vote.

==== 2022 ====
With redistricting following the 2020 census, the 11th District became somewhat friendlier for Sherrill. It was pushed further into Essex County while losing its share of heavily Republican Sussex County. Had the district existed in 2020, Biden would have carried it with 58% of the vote. Sherrill won by a much wider margin than in 2020, defeating Republican Passaic County assistant prosecutor Paul DeGroot, 59% to 40.2%.

==== 2024 ====
In 2024, Sherrill easily won the Democratic primary over real estate consultant Mark De Lotto with 93.6% of the vote. In the general election, she was reelected with 56.5% of the vote over Belleville building inspector Joseph Belnome. Sherrill outperformed the Democratic Party's concurrent nominees for president and Senate, as Kamala Harris won 53% of the district's vote and Andy Kim won 54%. The New Jersey Globe partially attributed Belnome's defeat to his attendance at the January 6 United States Capitol attack.

=== Tenure ===
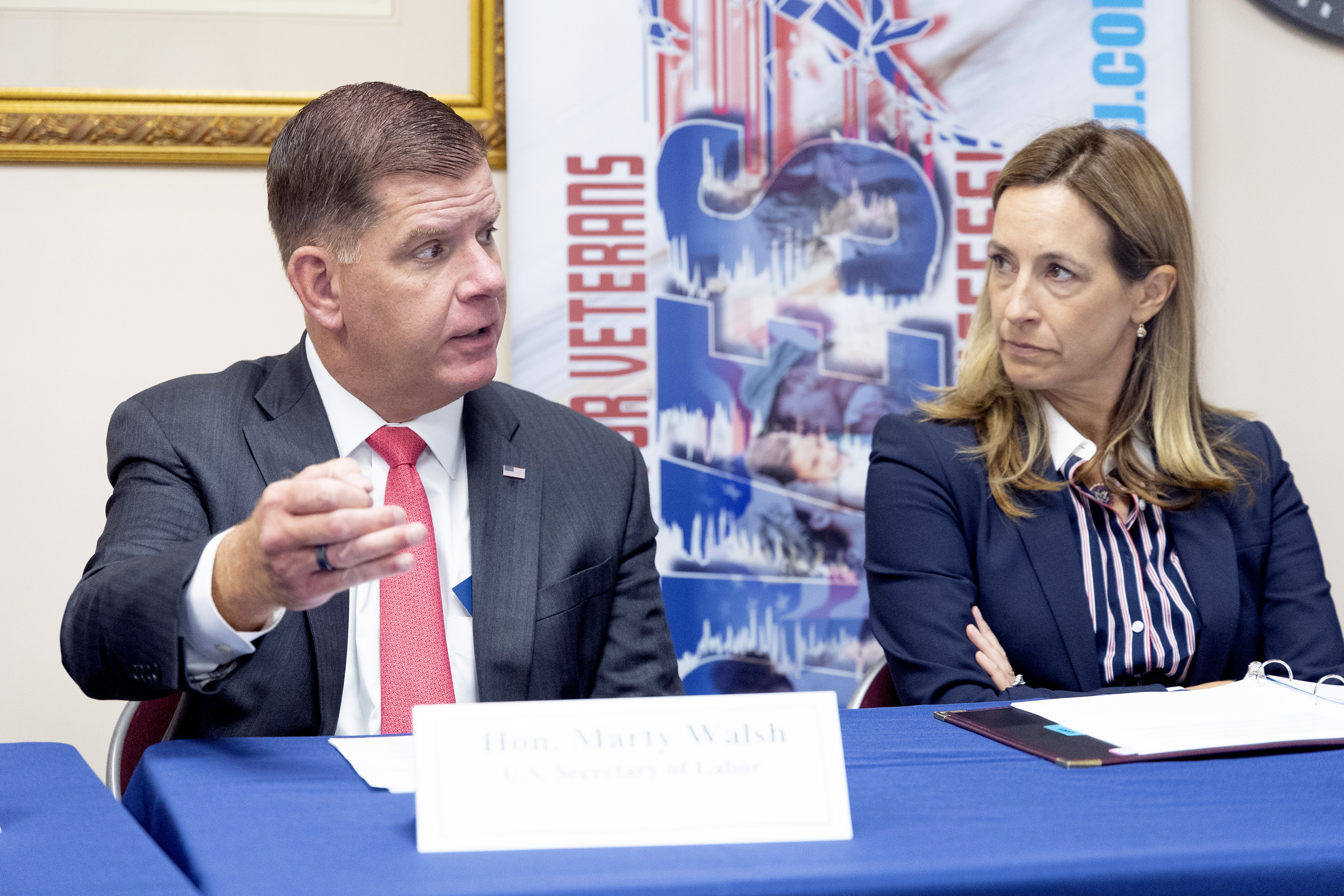
Sherrill with Labor Secretary Marty Walsh at an event for veterans entering the workforce in 2022

Following her election, Sherrill joined the moderate New Democrat Coalition, the second-largest Democratic caucus in the House, and was named its freshman whip. She also joined the Blue Dog Coalition, a caucus of moderate and conservative House Democrats, but left the group in 2023. She joined two other female veterans in the Democratic freshman class, fellow Naval Academy graduate Elaine Luria and former Air Force officer Chrissy Houlahan.

As she had promised her constituents, Sherrill did not vote for Nancy Pelosi to retake the speakership, instead voting for Cheri Bustos of Illinois. She voted "present", essentially an abstention, in her second speakership vote.

In 2019, Sherrill initially opposed exploring the first impeachment of President Donald Trump, but reversed course in September after a whistleblower alleged that Trump pressured Ukrainian President Volodymyr Zelenskyy to investigate Joe Biden. According to one report, Sherrill was instrumental in motivating Speaker Pelosi to proceed with the impeachment inquiry and said her "grave concerns" about Trump's behavior were "rooted in self-sacrifice and principle". An op-ed she co-wrote with six other freshman Democrats with national security backgrounds—Houlahan, Luria, Gil Cisneros, Jason Crow, Elissa Slotkin and Abigail Spanberger—said that "everything we do harks back to our oaths to defend the country" and described the claims against Trump as "a threat to all we have sworn to protect". Sherrill, Slotkin and Spanberger were described as the "mod squad", a moderate alternative to the progressive "squad".

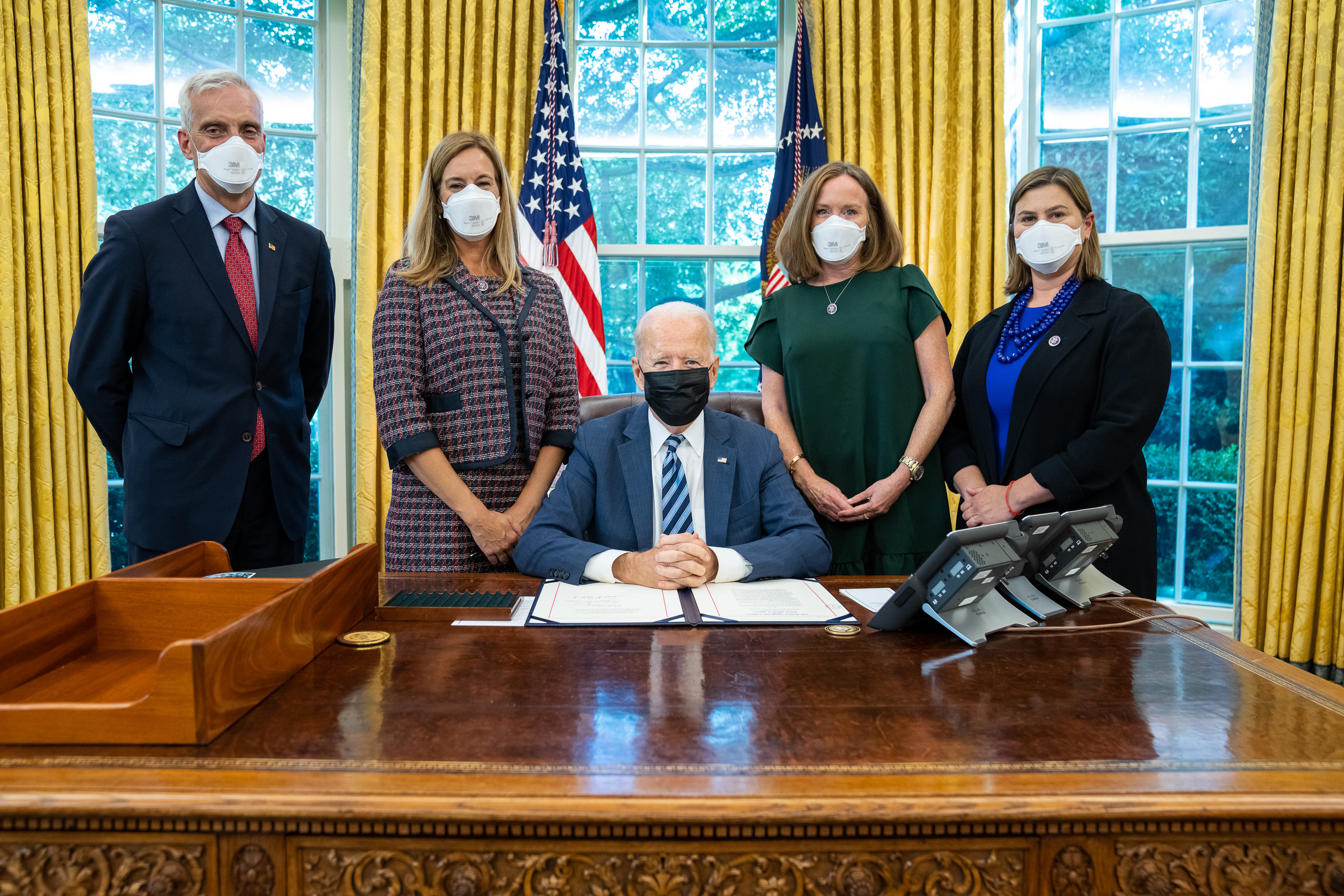
Sherrill with President Joe Biden, Denis McDonough, Kathleen Rice, and Elissa Slotkin in 2021

Sherrill indicated her support for a second impeachment of Trump after the 2021 United States Capitol attack. She said she had seen some colleagues giving what she called "reconnaissance tours" of the building the day before the attack.

Sherrill voted with President Biden's stated position 100% of the time in the 117th Congress, according to a FiveThirtyEight analysis. She voted with Biden 92.6% of the time in the 118th Congress through 2023, while Democrats in Congress voted with Biden 93% of the time on average during that period.

On February 1, 2023, Sherrill was among 12 Democrats to vote for a resolution to end the COVID-19 national emergency.

In 2023, Sherrill criticized the implementation of congestion pricing in lower Manhattan, New York City, calling the congestion pricing plan "New York's greedy cash grab from New Jersey commuters".

On July 9, 2024, Sherrill became the seventh House member to publicly request that Biden step aside as the presumptive Democratic nominee in the 2024 United States presidential election.

Sherrill resigned from Congress at 11:59 p.m. on November 20, 2025, after winning the 2025 New Jersey gubernatorial election.

=== Committee assignments ===
For the 119th Congress:

- Committee on Armed Services
  - Subcommittee on Cyber, Information Technologies, and Innovation
  - Subcommittee on Tactical Air and Land Forces
- Select Committee on Strategic Competition between the United States and the Chinese Communist Party

=== Caucus memberships ===
- Black Maternal Health Caucus
- Congressional Caucus for Women's Issues
- New Democrat Coalition
- Congressional Equality Caucus
- Global Positioning System Caucus
- Congressional Animal Protection Caucus
- Congressional Ukraine Caucus
- For Country Caucus
- Rare Disease Caucus
- Blue Dog Coalition (former member)

== Governor of New Jersey ==
=== 2025 election ===
County results map of the 2025 New Jersey gubernatorial election. Sherrill counties in blue; Ciattarelli in red.

Sherrill launched her campaign for governor on November 18, 2024, seeking to succeed term-limited incumbent Phil Murphy. Her campaign emphasized affordability (particularly property taxes and utility costs), protecting children, and increasing government accountability. She was endorsed by organizations including the New Jersey Education Association, Sierra Club, Health Professionals and Allied Employees, and several newspapers owned by Gannett.

In the June 10, 2025, Democratic primary, Sherrill won the nomination with approximately 34% of the vote in a crowded field that included Newark Mayor Ras Baraka, Jersey City Mayor Steven Fulop, Representative Josh Gottheimer and former state Senate President Steve Sweeney. She faced Republican nominee Jack Ciattarelli, a former state assemblyman who had narrowly lost the 2021 gubernatorial election to Murphy, in the November 4 general election.

The general-election campaign focused heavily on cost-of-living issues, with both candidates pledging to address high property taxes and utility rates. Late polling showed a competitive race, with some surveys indicating a close contest, but Sherrill won decisively with 57% of the vote to Ciattarelli's 43%, performing strongly in suburban counties and flipping some voters who had supported Donald Trump in the 2024 presidential election. Her victory made Sherrill the second woman to serve as governor of New Jersey (after Republican Christine Todd Whitman), the first Democratic woman in the role, and the first female military veteran to serve as governor of any U.S. state.

=== Tenure ===
Sherrill was sworn in as New Jersey's 57th governor on January 20, 2026, at the New Jersey Performing Arts Center in Newark, the first gubernatorial inauguration held outside the state capital of Trenton since the tenure of William Livingston, New Jersey's first governor. In her inaugural address, she emphasized affordability and government efficiency and took a defiant tone toward national political divisions. The inaugural ball was held at the American Dream Mall in East Rutherford, featuring performances by Naughty by Nature and other New Jersey artists. On her first day in office, Sherrill signed two executive orders: one declaring a state of emergency on utility costs and imposing a temporary freeze on electric rate increases, and one aimed at expanding clean energy sources. Due to severe winter weather, Sherrill declared a statewide state of emergency on January 23 to facilitate response efforts and resource allocation. As of late January 2026, Sherrill's early tenure has focused on fulfilling campaign pledges related to affordability amid ongoing economic pressures.

In February, Sherrill issued an executive order barring United States Immigration and Customs Enforcement (ICE) officials from operating on state-owned property, which includes office buildings, parking lots, and parkways. The United States Department of Justice subsequently sued New Jersey, arguing that Sherrill had violated the Supremacy Clause.

On March 10, 2026, Sherrill announced her Fiscal Year 2027 budget proposal, totaling a record $60.7 billion focused on affordability, fiscal responsibility, and education, aiming to cut costs amid New Jersey's structural deficit. The proposal includes $2 billion in proposed expenditure reductions, $4.2 billion in property tax relief, $22.5 billion for school aid, and $33 million for youth mental health services, while aiming to close corporate tax loopholes. On April 8, Sherrill signed legislation lifting a state nuclear moratorium in front of the Hope Creek Nuclear Generating Station, aiming to expand access to clean energy. Sherrill also announced the launch of the state's Nuclear Task Force to seek out new nuclear energy projects.

In early September 2026, an investigation began into Lieutenant Governor Dale Caldwell's "alleged inappropriate behavior with women and possible ethics violations that include the purported offer of state jobs". Sherrill appointed Attorney General Christopher Porrino to lead the investigation, which, on September 24, ended with the conclusion that the allegations against Caldwell were corroborated. On the same day, Sherrill called for Caldwell's resignation; Caldwell announced his resignation on September 25.

==== Public perception ====
On April 9, 2026, the Eagleton Institute of Politics released a poll showing Sherrill's approval at 45%, while 29% disapproved. On March 31, a Fairleigh Dickinson University poll showed Sherrill at 58% approval and 34% disapproval, giving her a net approval of +24, notably contrasting with her fellow freshman governor Abigail Spanberger's net approval of +1 in a Washington Post poll.

==== Delaney Hall ====
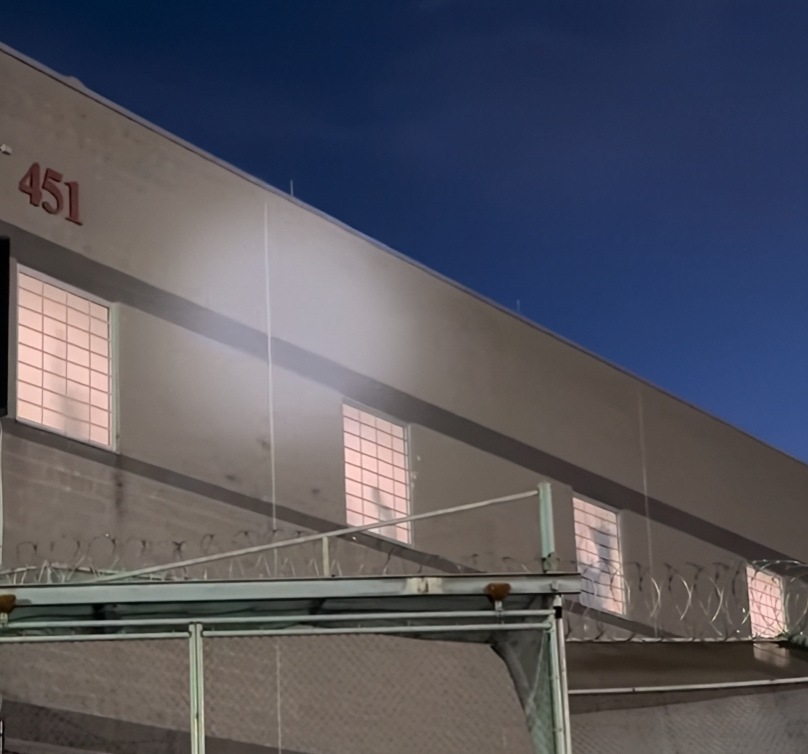
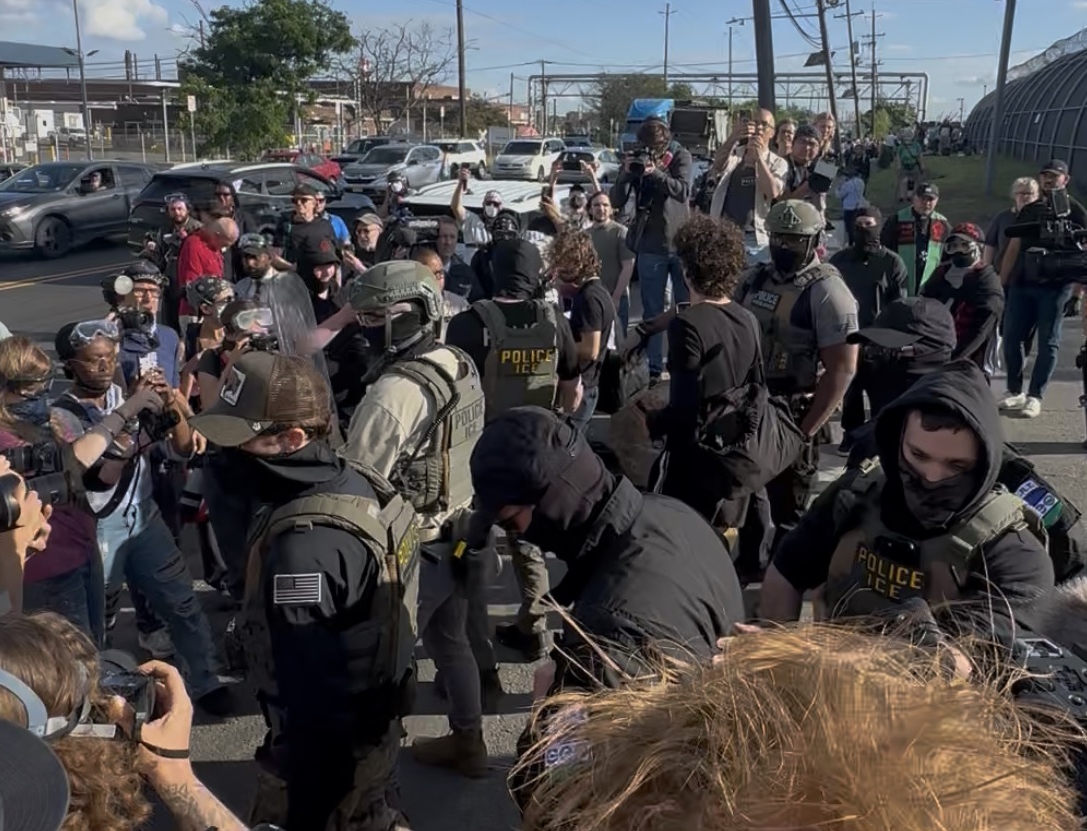
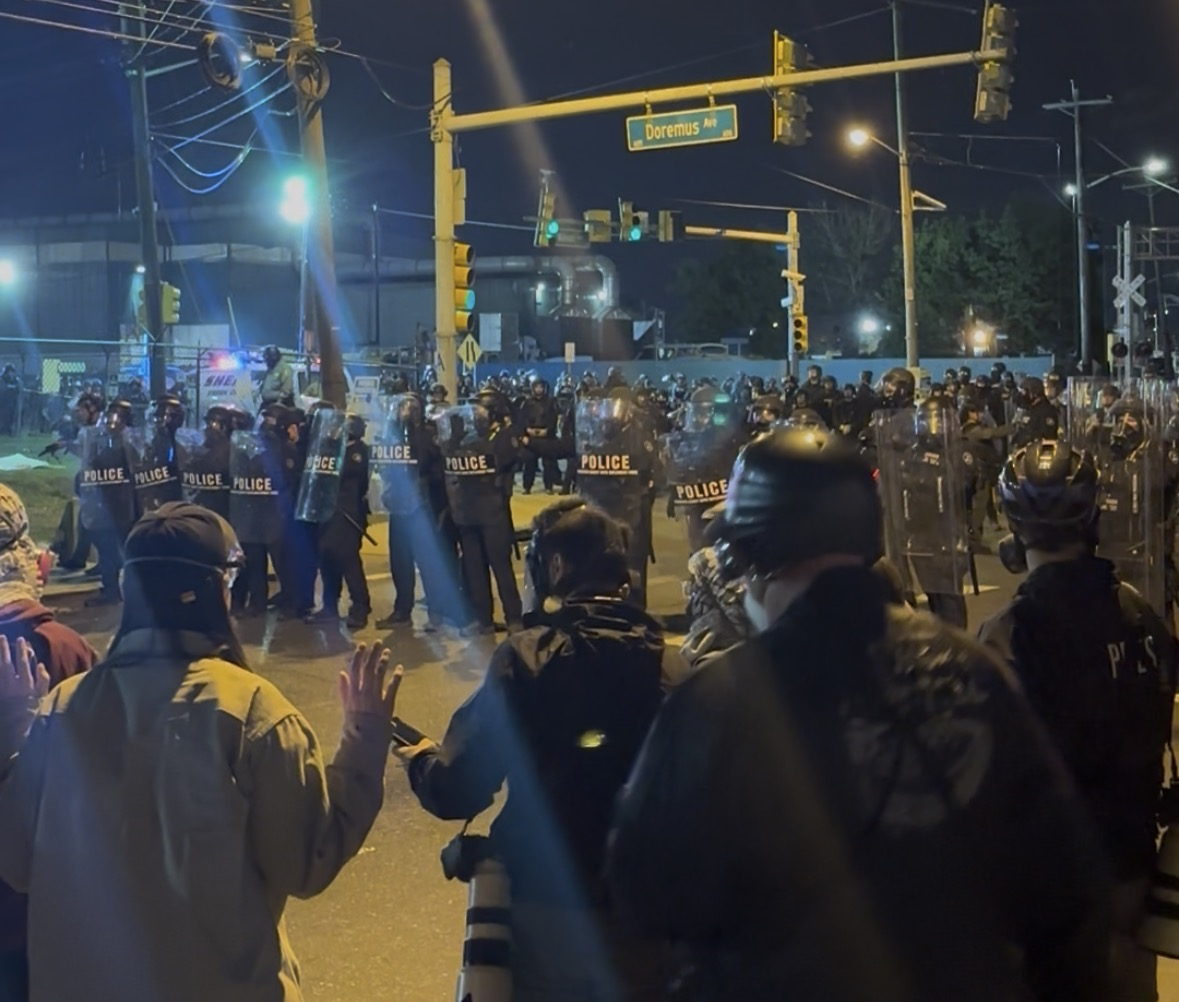
- Banner drop outside the facility, May 28
- Detainees wave at protesters from windows, May 25
- ICE agents outside the facility, May 28
- NJSP riot police outside the facility shortly before kettling and arresting protesters and journalists, May 31, 2026

On May 22, 2026, in Newark, New Jersey, immigrants detained in Delaney Hall, a private prison run by GEO Group used for holding immigrants detained by Immigration and Customs Enforcement (ICE), held a month-long hunger and labor strike protesting conditions inside the facility. Detainees were allegedly given expired food with worms or mold, sleep on the floor in overcrowded rooms, have been denied medical care for serious conditions, and have reportedly been abused by guards. Protests and civil unrest outside the facility in support of the strikers quickly escalated, resulting in over 90 arrests. Conditions inside the facility worsened, with reports of batons, pepper spray, and tear gas being used against strikers and multiple ambulances arriving at the facility throughout the strike. The strikes ended due to actions taken by guards to intimidate, segregate, and discipline strikers, such as by putting strike leaders in solitary confinement, threatening to force-feed strikers, and transporting strikers to unknown facilities around the country.

Some black bloc protesters blocked ICE vehicles from entering or exiting the facility. ICE agents attacked protesters and journalists with batons, pepper spray, and tasers, in many cases singling out and detaining protesters or pushing protesters into oncoming traffic. Local officials including Governor Mikie Sherrill (D) were denied access to the facility, and Senator Andy Kim (D) was pepper sprayed by ICE while trying to de-escalate.

Governor Sherrill ordered the New Jersey State Police (NJSP) to take over operations outside the facility for ICE, and she also established "protest zones" for protesters to move inside, while Newark mayor Ras Baraka (D) established an overnight curfew surrounding Delaney Hall. Riot police were then repeatedly deployed and used batons, pepper spray, tear gas, flash grenades, rubber bullets, horseback police, SWAT teams, armored vehicles, and undercover police to disperse, kettle, arrest, and criminally charge protesters who refused to leave, with many journalists being injured and arrested.

The Department of Homeland Security (DHS) has characterized protesters as being outside agitators and rioters, saying "There is NO hunger strike at Delaney Hall. There are NO subprime conditions or abuse at the facility." Governor Sherrill accused some protesters of being from "national extremist groups" without naming specific groups, and Mayor Baraka has criticized both protesters and police, saying the police's actions were "in some cases, unconstitutional." Municipal, state, and federal actions have sparked significant backlash from the political left and advocacy groups. Reporters Without Borders characterized the government's actions as "repression typical of an authoritarian regime."

===== "Protest zone" and riot police =====
External May 29 footage
- A cellist activist plays music — Independent videographer
- Police announce dispersal orders — Status Coup
- Journalists ordered to leave car — WNBC
- ICE agents shoot pepper bullets — Status Coup
- Horseback police advance on protesters — Status Coup
- Police use flash bangs and tear gas against protesters — Status Coup

- Protesters and "protest zone" outside Delaney Hall at 8:25pm, shortly before 9pm dispersal orders
- New Jersey State Police (NJSP) order Delaney Hall protesters to disperse under threat of arrest

On Friday May 29, Governor Sherrill ordered New Jersey State Police (NJSP), in collaboration with the Newark Police Division (NPD) and ICE, to take over operations outside Delaney Hall for ICE and establish a "peaceful, protected protest zone" for protesters to go inside in an attempt to "cool things down." She claimed she did so out of fear that there would be a surge of ICE agents in New Jersey if she did not send police to respond. The protest zone created by police was a 600-yard (550 meter) enclosure outside the facility consisting of orange interlinked metal bicycle parking rack fences and concrete blocks.

Department of Homeland Security (DHS) secretary Markwayne Mullin lauded the announcement as a "win for law and order," saying "Thank you, governor." Some protesters staged a sit-in and refused to move into the protest zone, which many protesters characterized as a "cage" and a WNBC reporter characterized as a "pen." One protester said "When sunset happens, they’re going to push us into that cage and mace the fuck out of us."

A Rolling Stone reporter said when they arrived at 6:30pm, "Militant, masked anti-fascists stared down a line of ICE agents in full combat gear — body armor, helmets, guns — standing at the gates of the facility." Most protesters were unwilling to give their real names to reporters due to safety concerns. Police gave up on forcing protesters into the zone, and according to the Rolling Stone:

It was still daylight, and the mood was largely calm. Some elderly protesters chanted and sang on a megaphone, priests and clergy drifted around, activists pushed carts of water and snacks. No one paid much attention to Sherrill’s "protected speech zone," except to use the empty blacktop as a canvas for chalk art. But there were signs that everyone expected the night to get much more tense.

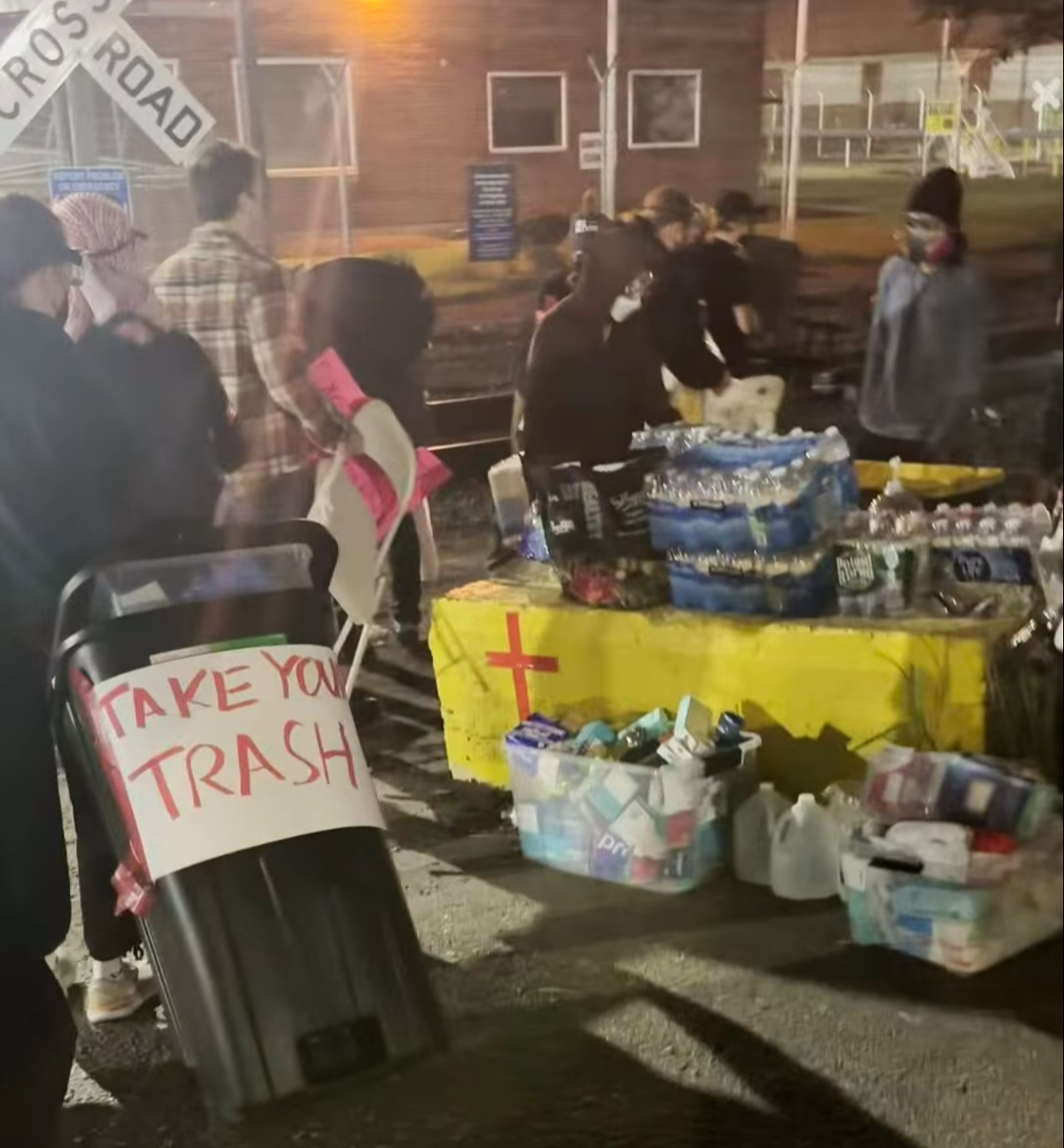
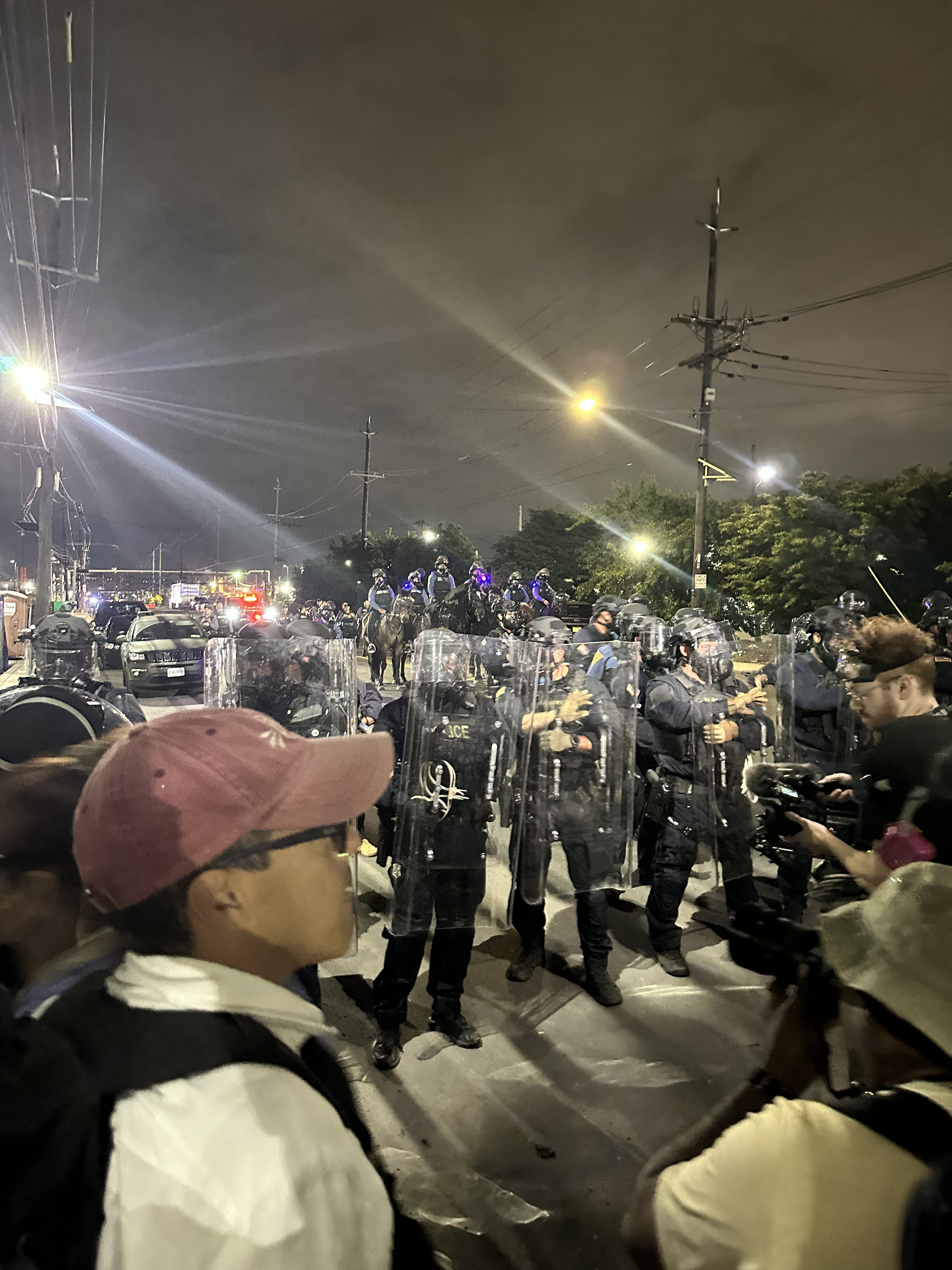
- Protesters moving supplies to a new location after receiving dispersal orders, 9:51pm
- NJSP in riot gear and on horseback in formation shortly before enforcing the curfew
- NJSP riot police advance on protesters with riot shields and stun grenades, while protesters use the traffic cone method to dispose tear gas
- NJSP horseback police advance on protesters, May 29, 2026

After 9pm, an NJSP sergeant arrived in a police SUV and read out an order to disperse from Delaney Hall over a loud speaker, with some members of the crowd yelling back. Officials said this was done in order to create a path for vehicles to exit the facility after state negotiations with federal officials concluded so police could assume control, and street medics in the crowd spread word of the shift change. Shortly after, a line of riot police appeared equipped with riot shields.

A coordinator for the Catholic advocacy group Pax Christi and a leader in Eyes on ICE said she thought the state police presence was "going to be a good thing" and that "up until the point when we saw the riot police with their riot shields, I thought we were gonna be okay based on all the representations I had gotten from legislators for a couple of days now."

NJSP riot police marched down the street on protesters who remained in the area, chanting "GET BACK. GET BACK. GET BACK." Riot police tossed a "volley of flash-bang grenades" that "ripped down the street," causing protesters to fall back. At the same time, officers fired tear gas at protesters using grenade launchers. Some protesters used the traffic cone method to dispose tear gas. As riot police marched, a WNBC news crew covering the clashes from inside a car was ordered by riot police to exit the car, forcing them to step into a cloud of tear gas. A reporter in the news crew said as she ran through the tear gas, she passed nonviolent protesters standing their ground and refusing to leave. At one point, the riot line "split abruptly" creating an opening, and police on horseback advanced through the opening towards protesters, forcing them back. The horses reached the "protest zone" fences, and metal clangs from the fences frightened the horses. The protesters quickly dismantled the "free-speech zone" and shoved its barriers under cars so people wouldn't be trapped or trampled as riot police advanced.

As riot police pushed protesters back, ICE agents watched and fired pepper balls from the facility according to The Nation, which ICE later denied. Troopers began making arrests, "slamming several protesters to the ground" and using pepper spray on the crowd. One officer "beat a demonstrator with a baton across the torso, knee, and calves as he tried to flee." One volunteer asked an old man for his name as he was "groaning" and "retching," with streaming eyes and his hands zip tied behind his back as he was being escorted behind the riot line and past the razor-wire fence into the detention center. Another woman arrested was "moaning in pain, one of her legs unable to support her weight." The next day, NJSP Lieutenant Colonel David Sierotowicz said "We were not striking anybody last night" and claimed they had used standard policing tactics. By the end of the night, six protesters (one from New Jersey, and five from New York and Pennsylvania) had been arrested and were later charged with disorderly conduct and obstruction of law enforcement. Four people arrested by ICE agents that night were charged with assaulting law enforcement officers, obstruction, and threats.

One man had been sitting down on a concrete barricade playing his cello as the riot police advanced, saying he considered it "to be a de-escalatory thing to do." The police then arrested him, and he was subsequently called by the Federal Bureau of Investigation (FBI), which asked him for details about protesters they described as "anybody planning to go to Delaney Hall with not the right intentions." The Intercept characterized this as the FBI trying to "flip" protesters into informants.

As troopers pushed protesters down the street past Delaney Hall, ICE agents watching from the facility advanced on protester supplies containing aid and food and began "trashing everything in sight." Shortly after, a convoy of vehicles containing ICE agents and DHS officers left the facility behind the riot line. After vehicles left the facility, riot police retreated and protesters began regrouping, with some chanting "Whose streets? Our streets!"

Protesters also confronted conservative influencer Cam Higby that night, and Higby pepper sprayed protesters during a confrontation.

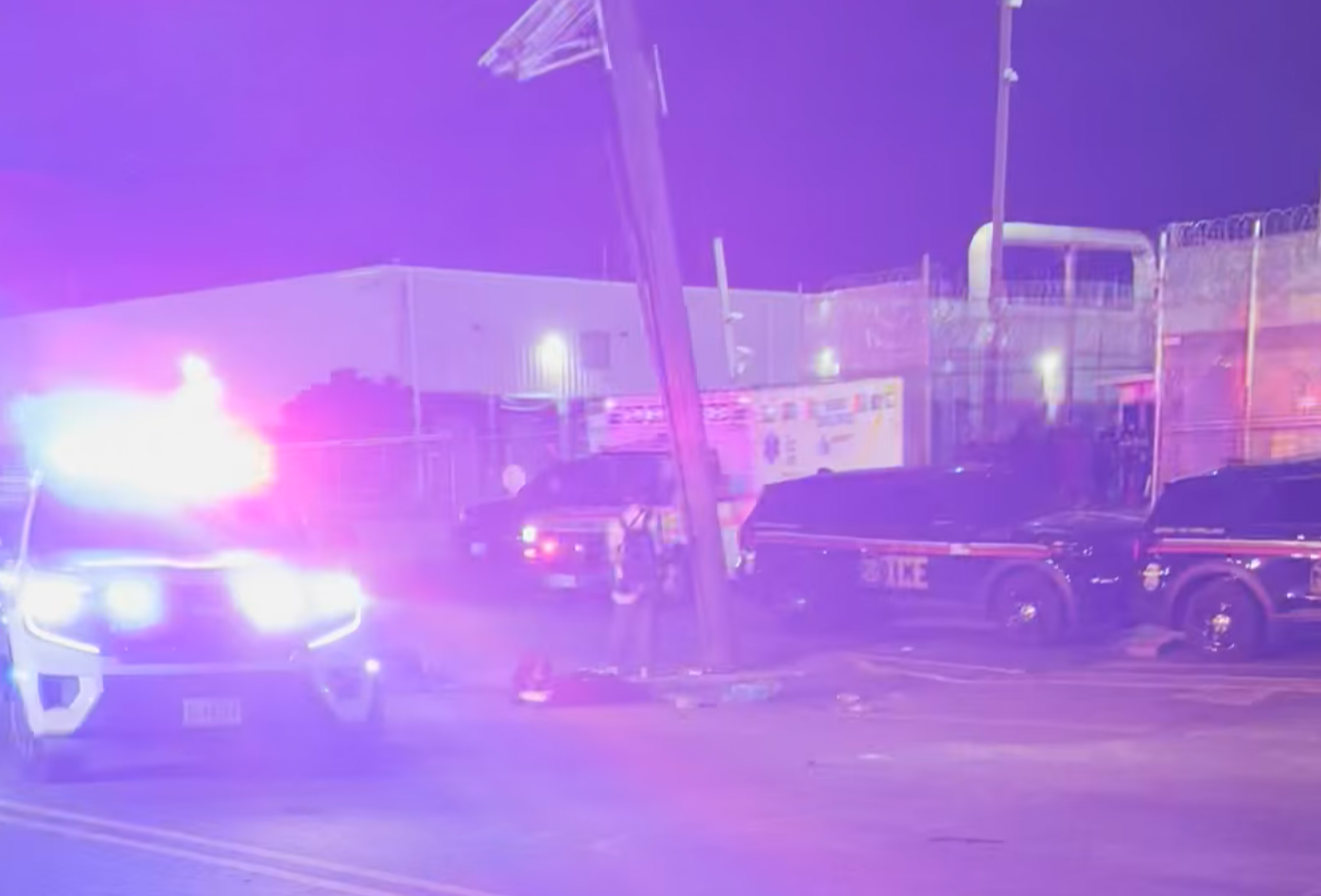
Ambulance leaving Delaney Hall at 11:39pm, May 29

After the skirmishes, one ICE vehicle was visible with a concrete block atop its smashed windshield, and one protester was charged with criminal mischief for smashing car windows by the NPD. The following morning, pepper spray was still able to be smelled in the air.

Sherrill censured out of state protesters, saying "To the people coming from out of state to create chaos and dangerous situations: you should not be here." She also said of the protesters "I do not know why these individuals attacked or what they wanted to accomplish." The DHS accused protesters of being part of a "coordinated campaign of violence against our ICE law enforcement." New Jersey Attorney General Jennifer Davenport accused protesters of throwing tear gas canisters at police prior to when dispersal orders were issued, which The Nation characterized as "a plainly ludicrous claim, since no protester would have been able to procure tear gas ahead of the action."

The political left has been critical of Sherrill's response, calling her actions a betrayal and viewing them as cooperation with ICE. After May 29, one protester's sign read "we asked Mikie Sherrill for help, and she tear gassed us." Status Coup journalist Jordan Chariton said "this is why Democrats continue to lose the faith of the American people. This is why even with Trump in power, Democrats have such low favorability ratings in Congress." The political director of the American Civil Liberties Union New Jersey said the NJSP's actions were "an unnecessary response to free speech and the right to peaceful protest," accusing police of "[mimicking] the dangerous and overly militarized tactics of the federal government." Senior Slate writer Aymann Ismail said Sherrill had escalated the situation.

Also on May 29, former Border Patrol officer Gregory Bovino — who led heavy-handed responses to the Operation Metro Surge protests — posted on X saying "ICE Agents at Delaney, hang in there" and to "Give them hell," attaching an image of himself making a gesture described by news editor Charles R. Davis as a Nazi salute.

===== Lawsuit against GEO Group =====
On Tuesday June 2, New Jersey Attorney General Jennifer Davenport announced a lawsuit by the state of New Jersey suing GEO Group in order allow the New Jersey Department of Health to inspect the facility.

===== ICE face masks =====
In March 2026, Governor Mikie Sherrill signed a bill banning law enforcement, including ICE agents, from wearing face masks in the state of New Jersey. However, ICE agents have worn masks outside Delaney Hall during the protests.

== Personal life ==
Sherrill is married to Jason Hedberg, a graduate and former classmate from the United States Naval Academy who served as a U.S. Navy intelligence officer and now works as an investment banker. The couple has lived in Montclair with their four children since 2010. She is Irish-American and Catholic.

During most of her time in Congress, Sherrill roomed with colleague Abigail Spanberger, who was elected governor of Virginia during the same 2025 election cycle as Sherrill.

== Electoral history ==
2018 Democratic primary results
Party	Candidate	Votes	%
Democratic	Mikie Sherrill	35,338	77.4
Democratic	Tamara Harris	6,615	14.5
Democratic	Mark Washburne	1,538	3.4
Democratic	Alison Heslin	1,253	2.7
Democratic	Mitchell H. Cobert	885	1.9
Total votes		45,629	100

New Jersey's 11th congressional district, 2018
Party	Candidate	Votes	%
Democratic	Mikie Sherrill	183,684	56.8
Republican	Jay Webber	136,322	42.1
Independent	Robert Crook	2,182	0.7
Libertarian	Ryan Martinez	1,386	0.4
Total votes		323,574	100.0
Democratic gain from Republican			

2020 Democratic primary results
Party	Candidate	Votes	%
Democratic	Mikie Sherrill (incumbent)	79,961	100.0
Total votes		79,961	100.0

New Jersey's 11th congressional district, 2020
Party	Candidate	Votes	%
Democratic	Mikie Sherrill (incumbent)	235,163	53.3
Republican	Rosemary Becchi	206,013	46.7
Total votes		441,176	100.0
Democratic hold			

New Jersey's 11th congressional district, 2022
Party	Candidate	Votes	%
Democratic	Mikie Sherrill (incumbent)	161,436	59.0
Republican	Paul DeGroot	109,952	40.2
Libertarian	Joseph Biasco	2,276	0.8
Total votes		273,664	100.0
Democratic hold			

New Jersey's 11th congressional district, 2024
Party	Candidate	Votes	%
Democratic	Mikie Sherrill (incumbent)	222,583	56.5
Republican	Joseph Belnome	164,556	41.8
Green	Lily Benavides	4,780	1.2
Independent	Joshua Lanzara	1,832	0.5
Total votes		393,751	100.0
Democratic hold			

2025 New Jersey gubernatorial election Democratic primary
Party	Candidate	Votes	%
Democratic	Mikie Sherrill	286,244	34.02%
Democratic	Ras Baraka	173,951	20.67%
Democratic	Steven Fulop	134,573	15.99%
Democratic	Josh Gottheimer	97,384	11.57%
Democratic	Sean Spiller	89,472	10.63%
Democratic	Stephen Sweeney	59,811	7.11%
Total votes		841,435	100.0%

2025 New Jersey gubernatorial election
Party	Candidate	Votes	%	±%
Democratic	Mikie Sherrill Dale Caldwell	1,896,610	56.88%	+5.66%
Republican	Jack Ciattarelli Jim Gannon	1,417,705	42.52%	–5.48%
Libertarian	Vic Kaplan Bruno Pereira	11,880	0.36%	+0.06%
Socialist Workers	Joanne Kuniansky Craig Honts	8,164	0.24%	+0.09%
Total votes		3,334,359	100.00%	
Democratic hold		Swing	+5.66%	

== See also ==
- List of female governors in the United States
- Women in the United States House of Representatives

U.S. House of Representatives
Preceded by Rodney Frelinghuysen	Member of the U.S. House of Representatives from New Jersey's 11th congressional district 2019–2025	Succeeded by Analilia Mejia
Party political offices
Preceded by Phil Murphy	Democratic nominee for Governor of New Jersey; 2025	Most recent
Political offices
Preceded by Phil Murphy	Governor of New Jersey; 2026–present	Incumbent
U.S. order of precedence (ceremonial)
Preceded by JD Vance as Vice President	Order of precedence of the United States; Within New Jersey	Succeeded by Mayor of city in which event is held
Preceded by JD Vance as Vice President	Order of precedence of the United States; Within New Jersey	Succeeded by Otherwise Mike Johnson as Speaker of the House
Preceded by Josh Shapiro as Governor of Pennsylvania	Order of precedence of the United States; Outside New Jersey	Succeeded by Brian Kemp as Governor of Georgia
