= J-L Cauvin =

American stand-up comedian and impressionist

- Born: Jean-Louis Cauvin; April 24, 1979 (age 46); New York City, U.S.
- Education: Williams College; Georgetown University Law Center
- Occupations: Comedian; attorney; politician
- Years active: 2006–present
- Height: 6 ft 7 in (2.01 m)

Jean-Louis Cauvin (pronounced koh-VAN; born April 24, 1979), better known by his stage name J-L Cauvin, is an American attorney and stand-up comedian. He is best known for his political satire and Donald Trump impression. In 2026, he unsuccessfully ran in New Jersey's 11th congressional district special election.

== Early life ==
Jean-Louis "J-L" Cauvin was born on April 24, 1979, in the Bronx, a borough of New York City, to a Haitian father and an Irish-American mother. He earned his undergraduate degree from Williams College, where he also competed in varsity athletics.

Cauvin was raised Catholic, and continues to practice.

== Career ==
In the early 2000s, Cauvin pursued a Juris Doctor from Georgetown University Law Center. While enrolled, he began performing stand-up comedy across New York and New Jersey. Cauvin graduated and passed the bar examination in 2005. He went on to serve as an Assistant District Attorney in the Bronx County District Attorney's Office. In 2009, he was laid off from his job due to the recession. Following this, he decided to pursue comedy full time and spent the next four years touring.

During Donald Trump's 2016 presidential campaign, Cauvin developed and began incorporating an impression of the president in his routine. He performed his impression on several radio shows and podcasts, including The Adam Carolla Show and The Dan Le Batard Show. In 2018, he developed Make Podcasts Great Again, a satirical podcast that critiqued Trump's behaviour and policies. Cauvin gained widespread attention for his Trump impressions during the 2020 United States presidential election with several of his social media videos receiving millions of views.

In 2019, Cauvin returned to law and took a job as a staff attorney. In late 2020, he confirmed that he was still working full time as an attorney in addition to making comedy videos.

In November 2025, Cauvin announced his candidacy for the Democratic nomination in New Jersey's 11th congressional district for the 2026 special primary election. His campaign focused on issues such as affordable housing, protection of seniors, and regulation of artificial intelligence. He lost the election, receiving 0.43% of the votes.

== Personal life ==
As of 2020, Cauvin lived in Bloomfield, New Jersey, with his girlfriend, Laura.

== Discography ==
=== Albums ===
- Racial Chameleon (2006)
- Diamond Maker (2008)
- Too Big To Fail (2012)
- Keep My Enemies Closer (2013)
- Israeli Tortoise (2016)
- Fireside Craps (2017)
- Famous Nobody (2019)
- Fireside Craps: The Deuce (2020)
- Half-Blackface (2024)

== Filmography ==
=== Radio and podcast ===
| Year(s) | Title | Role(s) | Notes | Ref. |
|---|---|---|---|---|
| 2015–present | The Adam Carolla Show | Himself | Series regular | |
| 2016 | The Dan Le Batard Show with Stugotz | Trumpgotz | Episode: "10-28-16" | |
| 2018–present | Make Podcasts Great Again | Host/Donald Trump | | |
| 2021–2025 | Rain on Your Parade | Host | | |

=== Television and film ===
| Year(s) | Title | Role(s) | Notes | Ref. |
|---|---|---|---|---|
| 2007 | The Late Late Show with Craig Ferguson | Himself | Episode: "4.155" | |
| 2008 | NESN Comedy All Stars | Himself | Episode: "1.7" | |
| 2022 | Billions | Darren Russakoff | Episode: "Rock of Eye" | |
| 2024 | J-L Cauvin: Half-Blackface | Himself | | |
