= National Korean American Service & Education Consortium =

American non-profit

The National Korean American Service & Education Consortium (NAKASEC, and 미주한인봉사교육단체협의회 or 미교협 in Korean) is a national service, advocacy and education organization for two non-profit multi-issue grassroots local community centers: the Korean American Resource & Cultural Center in Chicago and the Korean Resource Center in Los Angeles. NAKASEC is based in Los Angeles and a D.C. office opened in late 2008.

NAKASEC was founded in 1994 by local community centers to project a national progressive voice and promote the full participation of Korean Americans as a part of a greater goal of building a national movement for social change. NAKASEC was one of the major players in the Korean American community during the restoration movement after the welfare reform of 1996 through the "Fix '96 Campaign" and continues to be active in the immigration reform debate.

== History ==
KRC along with other centers in Seattle, Washington, DC, Houston and other cities, were established in the early 1980s by political activists who escaped South Korea after Chun Doo-hwan's military leadership crushed the Gwangju People's Uprising in May 1980. From the onset, the center set as its goals the delivery of social services, community education, rights advocacy, and preservation and enrichment of traditional cultures and work on identity. During the 1980s, it focused its advocacy in solidarity work with the democratization movement of South Korea, exposing grave human rights violations committed by the Chun regime. Because of its open challenge to the then dictatorial state of South Korea, KRC was a target of covert repression and kidnap attempts by the KCIA and the Korean Consulate.

With the Los Angeles Civil Unrest of 1992 and the anti-immigrant wave that swept across California with Proposition 187 in 1994, KRC steered its direction to issues of the Korean American community in Los Angeles, particularly around political education, civil rights and the defense of immigrant rights. In 1994, KRC and other sister centers across the United States, including YKASEC in New York City and KRCC in Chicago, founded the National Korean American Service and Education Consortium (NAKASEC, 미주한인봉사교육단체협의회), a national civil rights organization with a progressive Korean American agenda.

Under the leadership of NAKASEC, centers fought against Proposition 187, held community education on issues of race, and formed a broad coalition in the Korean American community against the Welfare Reform of 1996. Through a community fundraiser involving thousands of individuals, a full-page ad was posted in The Washington Post in 1997 demanding the president to end the attack on immigrants, and a campaign to restore welfare benefits for immigrants was launched in the late 1990s, winning back various benefits for lawful permanent residents and other immigrants. Many Korean American seniors became politicized during this struggle for benefits.

NAKASEC coordinated a national two-week fast for the passage of the DREAM Act in 2004 with the participation of 700 individuals, and held a summer community fundraising campaign, gaining the monetary contribution of 14,000 individuals, to post a full-page ad in The New York Times and The Washington Post urging the American public to support comprehensive immigration reform based on the principles of legalization of undocumented immigrants, an end to measures that prevented many families to be together, and the defense of workers' rights and civil rights & liberties.

== Korean American Resource & Cultural Center ==
The Korean American Resource & Cultural Center (KRCC for short, and 한인교육문화 마당집 or 마당집 in Korean) was founded in March 1995. KRCC has a strong youth program and leadership has worked broadly in a multi-racial and multi-ethnic environment. KRCC is member of a number of local coalitions, including the Coalition of Asian, African, Arab, European and Latino Immigrants of Illinois and the Illinois Coalition of Immigrant and Refugee Rights.

== Korean Resource Center ==
The Korean Resource Center (KRC for short, and 민족학교 in Korean) is a non-profit multi-issue, multi-mode grassroots organization based in Koreatown, Los Angeles that works with the Korean American, immigrant and low-income people of color communities of Los Angeles. It was one of the major players in the Korean American community during the restoration movement after the welfare reform of 1996 through the "Fix '96 Campaign" and more recently in issues of access to health services and immigration reform.

During the late 1990s and early 2000s KRC diversified its rights advocacy component into specialized programs that addressed health, immigrant rights and voting rights. KRC was part of the March 25th Marches with a million protestors in downtown Los Angeles as well as other protests. NAKASEC joined other labor, faith, and rights organizations in Southern California to form the We Are America Coalition, which mobilized hundreds of thousands of immigrants and allies in the May Day March.

KRC has traditionally been supported by the Korean American community in its entirety and relied on small size individual donations, sales of used cans and garage sales to sustain its programs. A recent trend has been to rely more on foundation grants, but its tradition of community support is alive in its campaign fundraisers as well as its continuance of can and garage sales.

=== Community Groups ===
KRC has a very strong and large senior age base because of its work with welfare rights and social services. KRC's anniversary booklet claims that KRC served over 5,000 Korean Americans free of charge during 2006, mostly through education and enrollment of Medicare Part D as well as Medi-Cal, low-income legal and tax services, naturalization, etc. Many seniors are active in all of KRC's components.

KRC runs its own poongmul troupe, called HanNuRi (traditional Korean peasant percussion music), and educates the community through its poongmul classes. KRC's poongmul troupe has become renowned in the activist community through its performance in rallies and cultural events.
