= Campaign Workers Guild =

American labour union

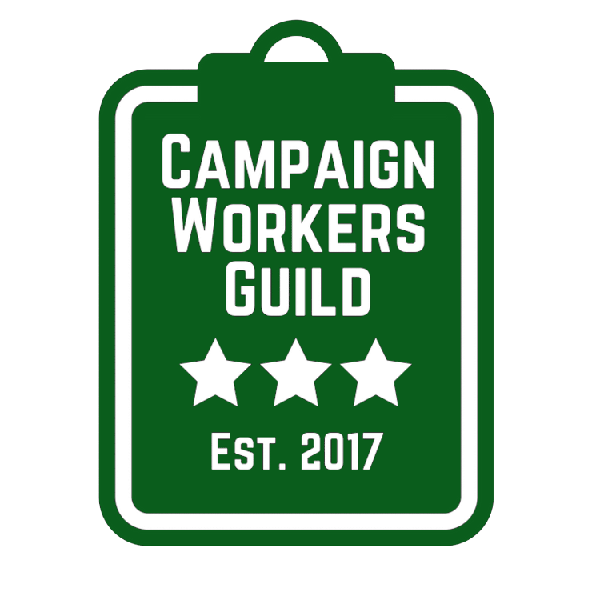
- Abbreviation: CWG
- Formation: 2017
- Type: Trade union
- Headquarters: Washington, DC, US
- Location: United States
- Members: 680 (2024)
- President: Ngakay Wong
- Website: campaignworkersguild.org

Campaign Workers Guild (CWG) is an independent American labor union. CWG represents workers on political campaigns, state parties, political consulting firms, non-profits, and other workplaces. The union advocates for higher wages, more reasonable work schedules, and improved practices to prevent sexual harassment on campaigns.

CWG was founded in early 2017 by current and former campaign workers. Notable workplaces whose staff unionized with CWG include President Joe Biden, Alexandria Ocasio-Cortez, Julian Castro, Pramila Jayapal, Deb Haaland, Randy Bryce, Cynthia Nixon, and ActBlue, among others.

== See also ==
- Congressional Workers Union
- Political campaign staff
