= CWG (repurposing company) =

Mobile phone recycling company

- Formerly: CMB Wireless Group
- Industry: Recycling
- Founded: 2006
- Headquarters: Bohemia, New York
- Website: www.cwg.com

CWG, also known as Communications Wireless Group, LLC (formerly CMB Wireless Group), is a global repurposing source for the wireless industry that specializes in the recycling and reuse of old cell phones, smartphones and associated accessories.

== History and operations ==
Founded in 2006, and headquartered in Bohemia, New York, the company markets itself as the leading recycler of mobile handsets serving the telecommunications industry.

The company promotes a sustainable business model built around the concept of reuse and maintains a strict zero-landfill policy. The company works with the carriers and manufacturers of mobile devices and provides a variety of reclamation services such as repair, refurbishment, secure data erasure, resale, take-back programs, and safe disposal.

The reclamation practices used by the company harvest down to the component level and salvage all reusable materials, such as precious metals, plastic and glass. Repairs are made with refurbished parts wherever possible, and all disposals are performed in an environmentally responsible manner.

In the United States, it is estimated that over 130 million cell phones are thrown away each year, creating over 65,000 tons of electronic waste every year. However, the repurposing of mobile handsets keeps electronic waste down, reduces greenhouse gas emissions, keeps toxic metals and plastics and out of landfills, and conserves natural resources.

The company processes over 3.5 million accessories and 1.5 million batteries annually; reclaims, tests and delivers over 100,00 parts per month; has kept over 1.7 million pounds of phone scrap out of landfills; and recycles for Verizon Wireless's HopeLine Program, which benefits and supports the victims of domestic violence.

== See also ==
- Economy of Long Island
- Electronic waste in the United States
- List of New York companies
