= Legislative assistant =

Profession

A legislative assistant (LA), government relations assistant, legislative coordinator, legislative director (LD), or legislative intern, is a person who works for a legislator as a legislative staffer or for an advocacy group in a politically partisan/semi-partisan or bipartisan capacity, in a non-partisan capacity at a think tank, research library, law library, law firm, trade associations, consulting firm or non-profit organization, or at a government agency as a legislative affairs professional, or in the government relations, regulatory affairs, regulatory compliance, public procurement (PP), public-private partnership (P3), business-to-government (B2G), and other similar industries in service of the employing organization by monitoring pending legislation, conducting research, legislative analysis, legislative research, legal research, policy analysis, drafting legislation, giving advice and counsel, making recommendations, conducting advocacy and outreach, and/or performing some administrative/secretarial duties. There is a diverse array of work experiences attainable within the legislative assistance, legislative affairs, and legislative relations field, ranging between internship, entry-level, associate, junior, mid-senior, and senior level positions.

== By country or supranational entity ==
=== In the United States ===
==== Congressional staff ====
===== Personal staff =====
Members of the United States Congress (both in the House of Representatives and Senate), as well as most members of other legislative bodies of sub-national subdivisions (states, cities, counties), have multiple legislative assistants who at the basic level are tasked in handling research and briefing (both verbal briefing and written memoranda) duties while legislative assistants that are advanced in their education or careers will advise on issues related to their particular expertise (e.g. education policy, environmental policy, tax policy). Often the assignments will be connected to the committee assignments of the specific elected member for which they work for in a semi-politically partisan capacity.

In most offices that report to a specific legislator, there is one staffer, variously called a legislative director (LD) or senior legislative assistant, who is in charge of all legislative assistants in the office. A person holding an internship level position while performing the duties of a legislative assistant is known as a legislative intern. The most common non-intern entry-level position within the personal staff section of the legislative assistance field is the position of staff assistant, who are responsible for all front office responsibilities, answers phones, schedules tours, often supervises the mail program, and serve as intern coordinators. A legislative correspondent (LC) is responsible for drafting letters in response to constituents' comments and questions and also generally responsible for a few legislative issues.

===== Support agency staff and Institutional staff =====
The research, think tank, and library divisions of legislative bodies, as such as the Library of Congress and the Congressional Research Service at the national level also utilize legislative analysts and legislative research assistants in providing non-partisan and at times confidential research and advice to members of the legislature and their (immediate) staff while not working directly under the direction, supervision, or authority of a specific elected political-partisan legislator or as committee staff but working on behalf of the legislature as a whole in a non-partisan capacity. They can also be found in other civil service support agency staff positions in legislative agencies. In legal matters, the research service employs legislative attorneys and legislative paralegals.

Some legislatures, like the United States Congress, have offices of legislative counsel, made up of lawyers known as legislative counsel, paralegals known as legislative paralegals, and other support staff that work in a nonpartisan capacity to assist the legislature with the drafting and formatting of laws. The most notable is the Office of the Legislative Counsel of the United States House of Representatives.

==== Legislative Affairs ====
Government agencies and cabinet departments in the United States (regardless of branch) have subsidiary offices of legislative affairs or congressional relations, that act as a liaison between government agencies and a legislature, to advocate on behalf of the agency, and to analyze legislation to bring the agency into compliance with new directives, laws, and regulations set forth by the legislature. Some possible positions within an "Office of Legislative Affairs," that participate in legislative assistance are legislative affairs specialists, legislative affairs analysts, congressional affairs specialists, congressional relations liaisons, legislative affairs paralegals, lawyers, and program analysts to name a few.

==== Private Sector, Think Tanks, Lobbying, Government Relations, and Policy Advocacy ====
The private sector and voluntary sector including both for-profit businesses and nonprofit organizations as well as advocacy groups, make use of legislative assistants within their lobbying divisions as well as in think tanks whether it be in a politically-partisan or non-partisan capacity in service of the employing organization's needs.

In organizations that conduct lobbying (government relations) activities, especially among advocacy groups and political action committees, exact counterparts with the same or similar titles -- such as legislative correspondent, staff assistant, or legislative coordinator -- exist; in these roles, government relations or policy and advocacy staff participate in administrative, legislative, and outreach duties such as drafting letters, conducting briefings and scheduling advocacy or constituent meetings with congressional staff and work as liaisons or principals when introducing likeminded constituent-advocates to their congress member or senator’s staff.

=== In France ===
In France, this position was formally opened after Edgar Faure visited the United States Congress in 1975. The assistants can also work on the non-legislative part of the MP job, such as managing transportation between Paris and the constituency, or handling a part of the MP's public relations.

=== In European Parliament ===
Following his election, an MEP can submit to the European Parliament one or more application and contract for the secretarial assistance allowance. Sometimes the submission has given way to criminal prosecution of the MEP, who falsely declared the duties of the assistant or diverted part of the financial flux to himself.

=== In India ===
In India, legislative assistants are recruited annually through a programme called the Legislative Assistants to Members of Parliament Fellowship (LAMP Fellowship). This program, initiated by PRS Legislative Research, was conceptualized by the Constitution Club of India in 2010. Every year, 50 candidates are selected and assigned to 50 Members from both the Houses of the Parliament. The selected candidates work as legislative assistants to the members for 11 months and receive a monthly stipend.
