= CWG Plc =

Nigerian technology company

- Type: Public company
- Traded as: NGX: CWG
- Industry: Information and communications technology (ICT)
- Founded: 1992
- Founder: Austin Okere
- Headquarters: Lagos, Nigeria
- Area served: Africa (Nigeria, Ghana, Uganda, Cameroon, Kenya, Rwanda), United Arab Emirates
- Key people: Phillip Obioha (board chairman); Adewale Adeyipo (CEO); Afolabi Sobande (COO); Moruf Ireti Yusuf (CTO)
- Revenue: ₦46.35 billion (2024)
- Operating income: ₦4.41 billion (2024)
- Net income: ₦3.04 billion (2024)
- Total assets: ₦29.9 billion (2024)
- Number of employees: Approx. 321 (as of 2024)
- Website: www.cwg-plc.com

CWG Plc (formerly Computer Warehouse Group) is a Nigerian pan-African information and communications technology company headquartered in Lagos, Nigeria. Founded in 1992, CWG is listed on the Nigerian Exchange and is regarded as one of West Africa's top providers of IT infrastructure, cloud, software, and managed services.

CWG has over 4,000 ATMs and infrastructure for over 15 financial institutions.

== History ==
Founded in 1992 by entrepreneur Austin Okere, CWG Plc began as a distributor of computer equipment and technical support. The company expanded into telecommunications in 1994 with the formation of DCC Networks, and, in 1997, acquired Expert Edge Technologies, enhancing its software capacity.

Regional expansion began in 2003 with CWG Ghana, followed by offices in Uganda (2010) and Cameroon (2012). CWG went public on the Nigerian Stock Exchange in 2013, raising ₦14 billion to fuel further expansion.

The company began CWG 2.0, a strategic plan to shift from hardware sales to digital platforms, software, and managed services. The innovation hub FifthLab was launched in 2022 to accelerate software product development. In 2023, CWG opened its UAE office in Dubai and began expanding into Kenya and Rwanda.

== Corporate governance ==
CWG is governed by a board that ensures strategic oversight, transparency, and stakeholder value.

Past CEOs

Austin Okere (1992–2015)
Founder and first CEO; led CWG's growth as a regional IT leader. He remains a non-executive director.
James Agada (2015–2018)
Former CTO; drove CWG's evolution towards software, solutions, and innovation.
Adewale Adeyipo (2018–present)
Current CEO; leads new growth phase, digital platforms, and IP-driven strategy.

Current executive team

- Adewale Adeyipo (CEO / group managing director)
- Afolabi Sobande (group COO)
- Moruf Ireti Yusuf (CTO)
- Harriet Attram Yartey (VP regions / MD, CWG Ghana)
- Peter Tumusiime (country manager, CWG Uganda)
- Tinu Adeyemi (group head, HR & general services)

Board of directors

- Phillip Obioha (chairman)
- Austin Okere (non-executive director)
- Abiodun Fawunmi (chair, Risk & Audit)
- Wale Agbeyangi (chair, Remuneration & Nominations)

== Operations and impact ==
CWG operates a hub-based model, with regional offices in Accra (Ghana), Kampala (Uganda), Douala (Cameroon), and Dubai (UAE), with Kenyan and Rwandan expansions underway.

The company has:

- Managed over 4,000 ATMs and provided IT infrastructure for banks in Nigeria.
- Launched CWG Academy (2010), training thousands in IT.
- Established the annual Texcellence Conference (launched 2022) as a technology thought leadership platform.

== Products and services ==
CWG provides solutions tailored to businesses, governments, and institutions:

- IT infrastructure solutions: Enterprise-grade deployment and mission-critical support, partnering with OEMs including Cisco, Oracle, Dell, and Microsoft.
- Software development and platforms: FifthLab (est. 2022) delivers digital platforms such as KuleanPay, Unified Cooperative Platform, Finedge, Bulkwave, SMERP and BillsnPay
- Managed services: 24/7 support, outsourced IT, infrastructure management.
- Cloud and digital transformation: Cloud hosting, cybersecurity, enterprise integration.
- Banking/fintech: Core banking solutions (notably Infosys Finacle), transaction automation, and ATM management for over 60% of Nigeria's ATMs.
- Smart metering solutions: Metering for utilities, energy analytics, and grid digitisation support.

== Financial performance ==
| Fiscal year | Revenue (₦ bn) | Profit before tax (₦ bn) | Profit after tax (₦ bn) | Total assets (₦ bn) |
|---|---|---|---|---|
| 2021 | 11.8 | 0.56 | 0.36 | 13.1 |
| 2022 | 14.3 | 0.81 | 0.49 | 15.4 |
| 2023 | 23.5 | 1.1 | 0.58 | 17.8 |
| 2024 | 46.3 | 4.4 | 3.04 | |

Key financial highlights (2021–2024):

- Revenue grew nearly fourfold.
- Profit before tax rose sharply.
- Net profit up over 400%.
- Total assets doubled alongside major innovation investments.
- Declared a final 2024 dividend of 39 kobo per share.

== Strategic initiatives ==
- FifthLab: In-house innovation hub launching banking, SME, and fintech platforms.
- CWG Academy: Established 2010, focuses on talent training in cloud, cybersecurity, and software, with thousands of graduates.
- Texcellence Conference: Pan-African annual event since 2022 convening policymakers, industry leaders, and innovators.

== Awards and recognition ==
- LEADERSHIP Awards: IT Company of the Year (2023)

CWG also maintains an ISO9001-certified quality management system.

== Key milestones ==
- 1992 – Company founded by Austin Okere
- 1994 – Launch of DCC Networks; acquisition of Expert Edge
- 2003–2012 – Expansion to Ghana, Uganda, Cameroon
- 2009 – PE funding for expansion after financial challenges
- 2010 – Launch of CWG Academy
- 2013 – NSE listing, raising ₦14 bn (first Nigerian ICT IPO)
- 2015–2018 – James Agada CEO, transformation period
- 2018–present – Adewale Adeyipo CEO, strategy-driven growth
- 2022 – Launch of FifthLab; 30-year anniversary
- 2023 – Dubai office launch; East Africa expansion

== See also ==
- Nigerian Stock Exchange
- Banking in Nigeria
- List of companies of Nigeria
