= List of people from Montclair, New Jersey =

Notable people from Montclair, New Jersey, United States

Notable people who were born in or have been residents of Montclair, New Jersey, include:

== Academics and science ==
- Mark C. Alexander, law professor at Seton Hall University
- Buzz Aldrin (born 1930), astronaut, who was the second man to walk on the Moon
- Virginia Lee Block (1902–1970), psychologist who contributed to studies regarding child and adolescent psychology
- Stella Stevens Bradford (1871–1959), doctor, specialist in tuberculosis and physical rehabilitation
- H. Bruce Franklin (1934–2024), author and historian who was expelled from his Stanford University professorship for involvement in a leftist group
- Tom Galligan (born 1955), lawyer, legal scholar, administrator and educator who has been dean and professor of law of Louisiana State University's Paul M. Hebert Law Center
- Dean Hamer (born 1952), scientist, author and filmmaker who discovered a link between sexual orientation and Xq28
- Jordan Harrod (born 1996), research scientist and YouTuber who works on neuroengineering, brain-machine interfaces, and machine learning for medicine
- George Rice Hovey (1860–1943), university president, professor, minister and author who served as the president of Virginia Union University from 1904 to 1918
- John A. Kenney Jr. (1914–2003), pioneering African-American dermatologist who specialized in the study of skin disorders affecting racial minorities, earning him recognition as the "dean of black dermatology"
- Joshua Lederberg (1925–2008), geneticist who received the 1958 Nobel Prize in Physiology or Medicine for work in bacterial genetics; born in Montclair
- Ronald T. Raines (born 1958), chemical biologist and expert on the chemistry and biology of proteins
- Mark SaFranko, writer, playwright and actor
- Kenneth B. Smith (1931–2008), President of the Board of Education of the Chicago Public Schools who also served as President of the Chicago Theological Seminary
- Leo Sternbach (1908–2005), chemist, invented precursor to Valium
- Bruce Wands (1949–2022), educator, author, artist and musician, with a specific interest in digital art
- Edward Weston (1850–1936), electrical engineer and inventor whose Weston Electrical Instrument Company won the contract to illuminate the Brooklyn Bridge

== Arts ==
=== Authors, journalists and publishers ===
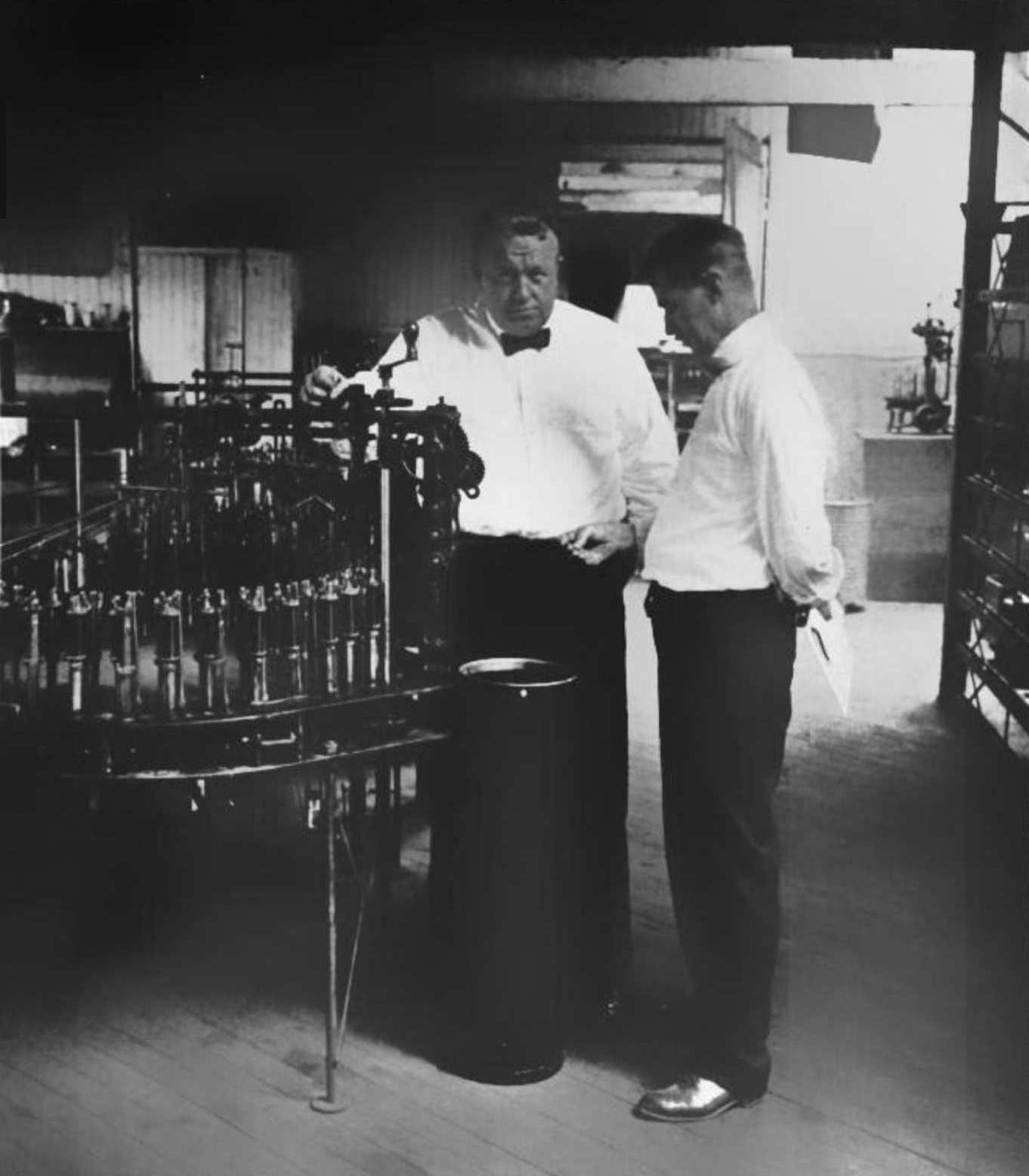
Frank Bunker Gilbreth Sr.

- Virginia Hamilton Adair (1913–2004), poet
- Jonathan Alter (born 1957), Newsweek magazine journalist
- Wheeler Antabanez (born 1977), author who has written for Weird NJ
- Mary Travis Arny (1909–1997), author, naturalist, historian, and educator
- Zain Asher (born 1983), news anchor at CNN International, who anchors the network's primetime, global news show One World with Zain Asher
- Jim Axelrod (born 1963), national correspondent for CBS News; reporter for the CBS Evening News
- Eric Boehlert (1965–2022), journalist, author, frequent contributor to The Huffington Post and contributing editor to Rolling Stone
- David Carr (1956–2015), media and culture columnist for The New York Times
- Wendy Coakley-Thompson (born 1966), author of the novel Back to Life
- Fleur Cowles (1908–2009), painter, journalist, hostess, socialite and founder of Flair magazine; claimed to have been born in Montclair but records from the United States Census Bureau indicate that she was born in New York City
- Oliver Crane (1822–1896), Presbyterian clergy, Oriental scholar, and writer
- Anthony DePalma (born 1952), author, journalist, and educator who was a foreign correspondent and reporter for The New York Times
- Louise DeSalvo (1942–2018), author
- Christopher Durang (born 1949), contemporary playwright
- Edward S. Ellis (1840–1916), teacher, school administrator, journalist; author of hundreds of publications under his name and many pseudonyms
- Jessie Redmon Fauset (1882–1961), novelist, poet, literary critic for The Crisis; later teacher
- Philip L. Fradkin (1935–2012), environmentalist, historian, journalist, and author who wrote about topics including water conservation, earthquakes, and nuclear weapons
- Dorothea Benton Frank (1951–2019), novelist
- Ian Frazier (born 1951), writer, humorist and essayist
- Frank Bunker Gilbreth Sr. (1868–1924) and Lillian Moller Gilbreth (1878–1972), and their twelve children, featured in the autobiography Cheaper by the Dozen and Belles on Their Toes by Ernestine Gilbreth Carey and Frank Bunker Gilbreth Jr.
- Susan Glasser (born 1969), journalist who is a staff writer for The New Yorker
- Alfred Starr Hamilton (1914–2005), poet
- Bob Herbert (born 1945), syndicated op-ed columnist for The New York Times
- Coleman Hughes (born 1996), author, political commentator and jazz musician
- Ken Johnson (born 1953), art critic for The New York Times
- Jon Katz (born 1947), author
- Peter King (born 1957), journalist and Sports Illustrated senior writer
- Christina Baker Kline (born 1964), novelist who is the author of seven novels, including Orphan Train
- Michael Laser (born 1954), author
- Donna Leon (born 1942), novelist
- Arthur Levine (born 1962), editor, author and publisher of children's books, including the American editions of the Harry Potter series
- Lisa Lucas, executive director of the National Book Foundation and senior vice president at Knopf Doubleday
- Anne McCaffrey (1926–2011), prolific writer of fantasy and science fiction best known for her Dragonriders of Pern series
- Susan Meddaugh, author of the Martha Speaks series of children's books, whose first home in Montclair was 33 Fairfield Street, where Martha the talking dog "lives" now
- Gil Noble (1932–2012), American television reporter and interviewer
- Isabel Paterson (1886–1961), journalist, novelist, political philosopher, author of The God of the Machine
- Stacey Patton, journalist, writer, speaker, commentator and college professor
- Julia Phillips (born 1989), author whose book Disappearing Earth was a finalist for the 2019 National Book Award for Fiction
- Jodi Rudoren (born 1970), journalist and editor of The Forward
- Pamela Redmond Satran (born 1953), author
- Andrew Rosenthal (born 1956), editorial page editor of The New York Times and son of the paper's former executive editor A.M. Rosenthal
- Roger Sedarat, poet, scholar and literary translator
- Florence Guy Woolston Seabury (1881–1951), feminist essayist
- Lee Siegel (born 1957), writer and cultural critic
- Richard Wesley (born 1945), screenwriter and playwright
- Valerie Wilson Wesley (born 1947), mystery writer
- Jana Winter, Fox News Channel reporter

=== Fashion ===
- Bobbi Brown (born 1957), makeup artist
- Lisa Lindahl (born 1948), writer, artist, activist and inventor
- Jack McCollough (born 1978), fashion designer; co-creator of Proenza Schouler
- Polly Smith (born 1949), designer, inventor and creator of the sports bra, who was a costume designer for The Muppet Show and Sesame Street
- Louise Vyent, Dutch-born fashion model and portrait photographer

=== Fictional characters ===
- Paul Kinsey, on Mad Men
- Millicent Kent, in David Foster Wallace's novel Infinite Jest
- Office of Jennifer Melfi, on The Sopranos
- Marnie Michaels, on Girls

=== Fine arts ===
- Thomas Ball (1819–1911), sculptor
- Bill Binzen (1918–2010), photographer
- Richard Lewis Blinder (1935–2006), architect and supporter of historical architectural preservation
- Nanette Carter (born 1954), artist and college educator, best known for her collages with paper, canvas and Mylar
- Jane White Cooke (1913–2011), portrait painter
- William Couper (1853–1942), sculptor
- Edna Eicke (1919–1979), illustrator
- Harry Fenn (1845–1911), English-born illustrator, primarily of landscapes
- Lola Flash (born 1959), photographer known for her genderqueer visual political work
- Russ Heath (1926–2018), cartoonist best known for his comic book work with DC Comics
- John Langley Howard (1902–1999), muralist, printmaker and illustrator, known for his social realism
- George Inness (1825–1894), landscape painter
- Elizabeth Jones (born 1935), Chief Engraver of the United States Mint, holding this position from 1981 until her resignation in 1991
- Max Kolomatsky, street artist
- Joe McNally (born 1952), photographer
- Dorothy Canning Miller (1904–2003), art curator
- Tom Nussbaum (born 1953), sculptor and visual artist
- Michael Yamashita (born 1949), photographer known for his work in National Geographic and his multiple books of photographs

=== Movies, stage and television ===
- Charles S. Belden (1904–1954), screenwriter and journalist, known for writing screenplays to several Charlie Chan films in the 1930s
- Richard E. Besser (born 1959), former acting director of Centers for Disease Control; former Senior Health and Medical Editor at ABC News
- John Block (born 1951), documentary filmmaker
- Elaine Bromka (born 1950), actress who co-wrote the play Lady Bird, Pat & Betty: Tea for Three
- Jacqueline Brookes (1930–2013), film, television and stage actress, best known for her work both off-Broadway and on Broadway
- Richard Burgi (born 1958), actor
- John Callahan (1953–2020), actor, Falcon Crest, Santa Barbara, All My Children, Days of Our Lives
- Stephen Colbert (born 1964), television personality who was host of The Late Show with Stephen Colbert
- Margaret Colin (born 1957), actress, Gossip Girl, The Edge of Night, Something Wild, Independence Day
- Michael Colleary (born 1960), screenwriter and producer of Face/Off, Lara Croft Tomb Raider and Firehouse Dog
- R.J. Colleary (born 1957), television writer, producer and playwright, known forTouched By An Angel and Harry and the Hendersons
- Robert M. Colleary (1929–2012), Peabody and Emmy Award-winning comedy writer best known for his more than two decades as head writer on Captain Kangaroo
- Kristen Connolly (born 1980), actress
- Kahane Cooperman, documentary filmmaker and television director and producer, whose 2016 documentary Joe's Violin was nominated for an Academy Award for Best Documentary Short Subject
- Justin Deas (born 1948), actor
- Dagmara Dominczyk (born 1976), actress
- Olympia Dukakis (1931–2021), Academy Award-winning actress, Moonstruck, Steel Magnolias, Mr. Holland's Opus
- Allen B. DuMont (1901–1965), television pioneer
- Beth Ehlers (born 1968), actress on Guiding Light and All My Children
- Frankie Faison (born 1949), actor, The Silence of the Lambs
- Frank Field (1923–2023), meteorologist, former resident
- Savion Glover (born 1974), tap dancer and choreographer
- Peter Greene (born 1965), actor, Pulp Fiction, The Mask
- Sterling Hayden (1916–1986), actor, Dr. Strangelove, The Godfather, The Asphalt Jungle, 9 to 5
- Anthony Heald (born 1944), actor, The Silence of the Lambs, Boston Public
- Shuler Hensley (born 1967), actor; won a Tony Award for Oklahoma!
- Louis Jean Heydt (1903–1960), actor
- Steve Hofstetter (born 1979), comedian and radio personality
- Janet Hubert-Whitten (born 1956), television and Broadway actress
- Whip Hubley, actor who appeared in Top Gun
- Vincent Irizarry (born 1959), Emmy Award-winning actor who appeared on All My Children
- The Amazing Kreskin (1935–2024), paranormalist and TV personality
- Eva La Rue (born 1966), actress, model, singer
- Nicole Leach (born 1979), actress
- Delroy Lindo (born 1952), actor nominated for Tony and SAG awards; Get Shorty, The Cider House Rules, Crooklyn, Gone in 60 Seconds, Malcolm X, More American Graffiti
- Warren Littlefield (born 1952), President of NBC in the 1990s
- Priscilla Lopez (born 1948), actress, singer, dancer, Maid in Manhattan
- Tyler Mathisen (born 1957), writer, editor, co-host of CNBC's Power Lunch
- John Miller (born 1959), journalist, author, former FBI and ABC News journalist, current CBS News senior correspondent and investigative reporter
- Trevor Moore (1980–2021), comedian, actor, writer, director and producer, known for The Whitest Kids U' Know
- Joe Morton (born 1947), actor, Scandal
- Raphaela Neihausen (born 1976), filmmaker and producer
- Michael O'Leary (born 1958), actor who portrayed Dr. Fredrick "Rick" Bauer on Guiding Light
- Roscoe Orman (born 1944), actor who portrayed Gordon Robinson on Sesame Street
- Stacie Passon (born 1969), film director and screenwriter
- Kal Penn (born 1977), actor who appeared in Harold & Kumar Go to White Castle and was also a government employee
- Todd Porter (born 1968), child/teen actor, Starstuff, Pinocchio's Christmas, Whiz Kids
- Christina Ricci (born 1980), actress whose films include The Addams Family, Buffalo '66, Monster, Sleepy Hollow
- Rosemary Rice (1925–2012), actress who played Katrin on Mama, voice-over artist and children's musician
- Ben Rosenfield (born 1992), actor
- Bruce Sinofsky (1956–2015), screenwriter, editor, producer and filmmaker, who was a 2012 Academy Award nominee
- Elaine Stewart (1930–2011), model and Hollywood actress of the 1950s, promoted as a "dark-haired Marilyn Monroe"
- Sophia Takal, actress, writer and director
- Michelle Thomas (1968–1998), actress who played Myra on Family Matters
- Dallas Townsend (1919–1995), anchor for CBS World News Roundup
- Adam Wade (1935–2022), singer, musician and actor, whose stint as host of the CBS game show Musical Chairs (1975) made him the first Black game show host in the United States
- Jake Weary (born 1990), actor, As the World Turns
- Mary Alice Williams (born 1949), television personality
- Wendy Williams (born 1964), TV and radio personality, host of The Wendy Williams Show
- Patrick Wilson (born 1973), actor, who has appeared in Watchmen, The A-Team and Little Children
- Alex Winter (born 1965), actor
- Kim Zimmer (born 1955), actress best known for appearing on Guiding Light
- Louis Zorich (1924–2018), actor, who appeared on Mad About You; husband of actress Olympia Dukakis

=== Music ===
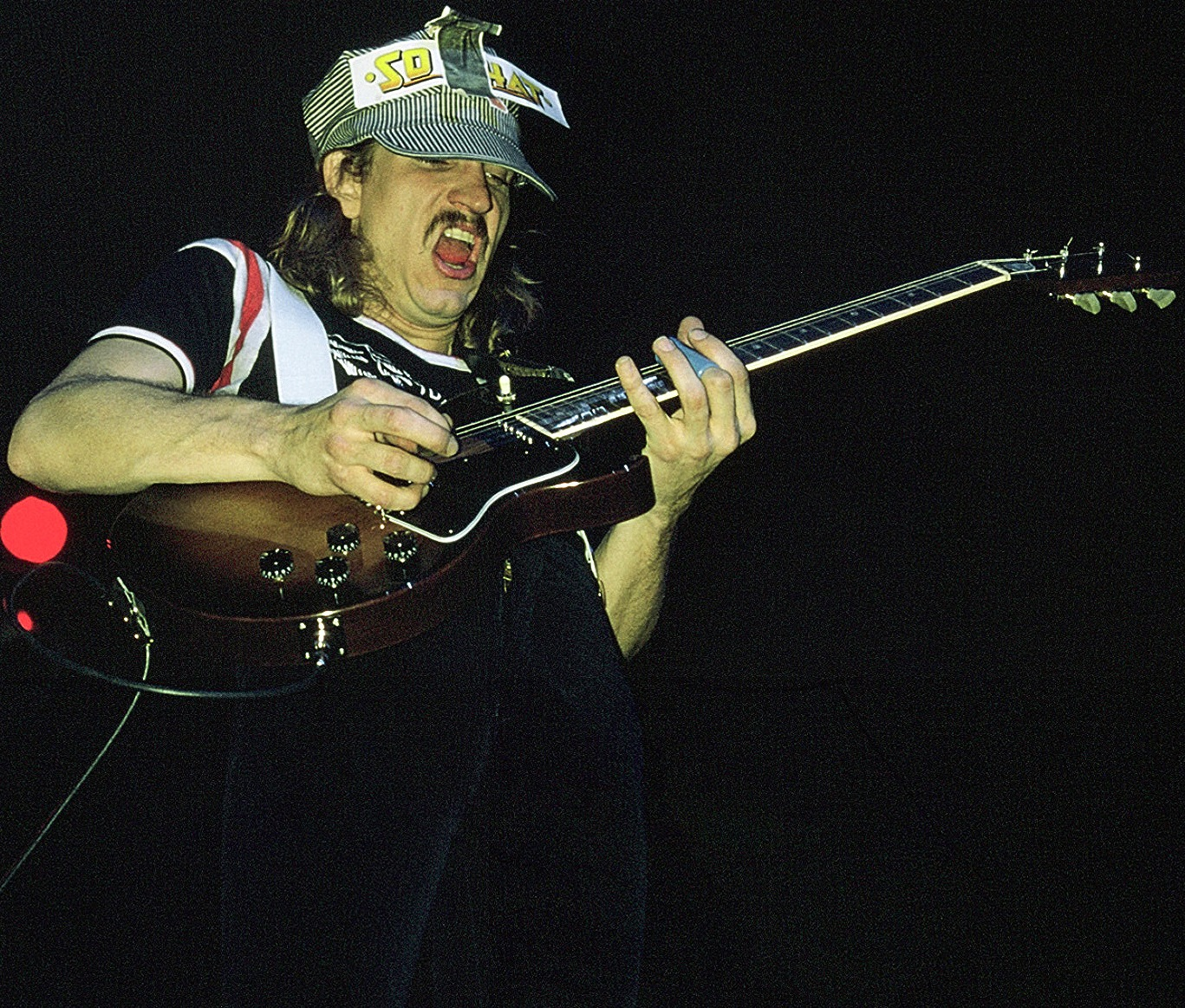
Joe Walsh

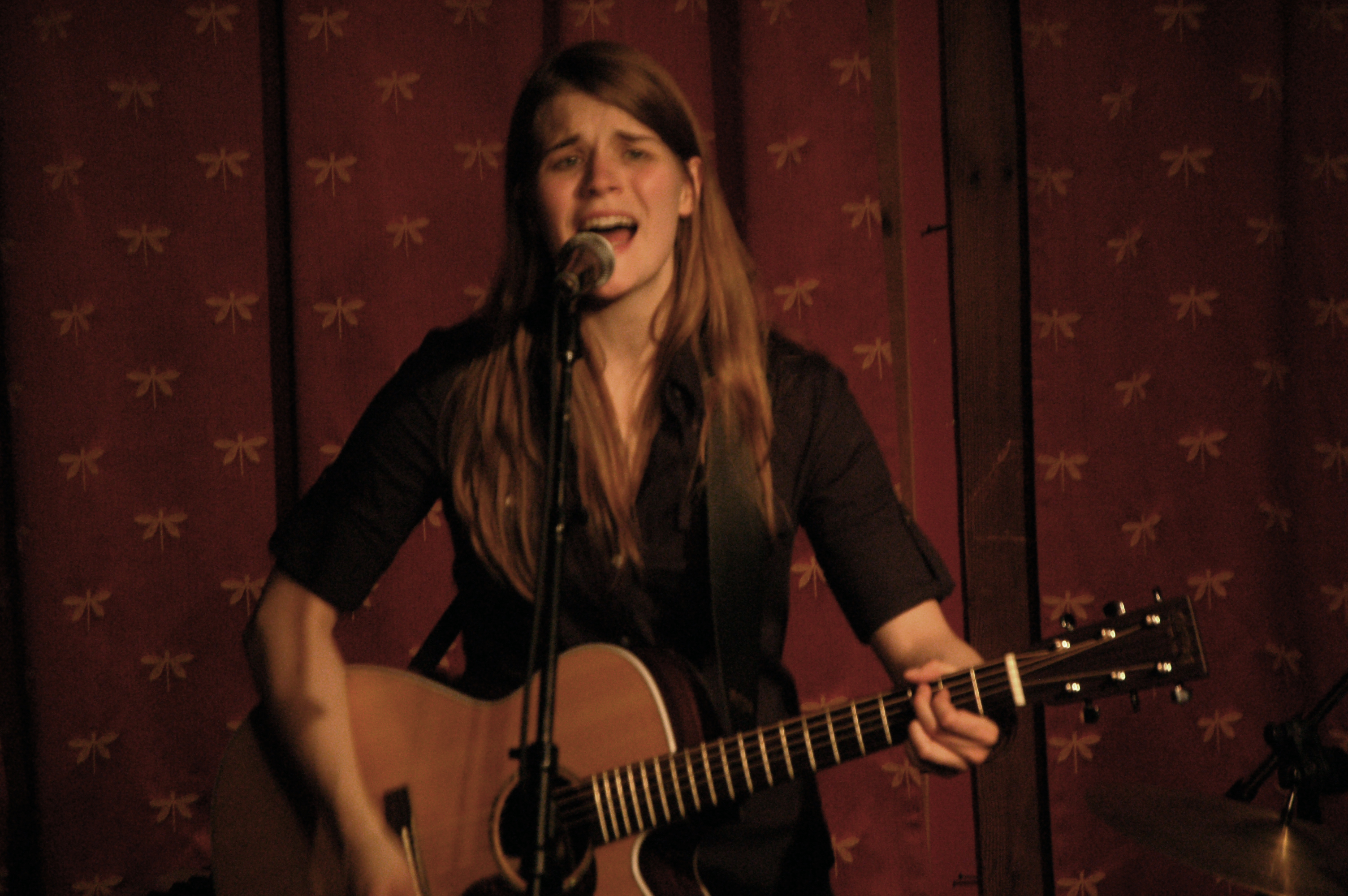
Jenny Owen Youngs

- Geri Allen (1957–2017), jazz pianist
- Al Anderson (born 1950), guitarist and songwriter; played with Bob Marley & The Wailers
- Mark Andrews (1875−1939), British-born organist and composer
- David Bendeth (born 1954), musician, songwriter and producer
- Chuck Burgi (born 1952), drummer
- Jackie Cain (1928–2014), jazz singer known for her partnership with her husband in the duo Jackie and Roy
- Ted Curson (1935–2012), jazz trumpeter
- Robert DeLeo (born 1966), bass player, songwriter, and harmony vocalist for the Stone Temple Pilots
- Tommy DeVito (1928–2020), guitarist and vocalist for The Four Seasons
- Michael Fabiano (born 1984), opera singer
- Hussein Fatal (1973–2015), rapper, former member of the Outlawz
- Bob Gaudio (born 1942), singer, songwriter, musician, record producer and songwriting member of The Four Seasons
- Evan Stephens Hall (born 1989), musician best known as frontman of indie rock band Pinegrove
- Billy Hart (born 1940), jazz drummer
- Herman Hupfeld (1894–1951), lyricist who wrote "As Time Goes By", the song featured in the 1943 Oscar winner Casablanca
- Dorothy Kirsten (1910–1992), lyric soprano
- Vincent La Selva (1929–2017), symphony and opera conductor
- Gene Lake (born 1966) jazz drummer
- Oliver Lake (born 1944), alto saxophone player and composer
- Joseph Lamb (1887–1960), prominent composer of ragtime music
- Reggie Lucas (1953–2018), musician, songwriter and record producer best known for having produced the majority of Madonna's 1983 self-titled debut album
- Gregori Lukas (born 1990), recording artist, singer, dancer and actor
- Christian McBride (born 1972), three-time Grammy Award winner for jazz (bass)
- Jim McNeely (born 1949), Grammy-winning jazz pianist, composer and arranger
- Anwar Robinson (born 1979), singer, contestant on American Idol
- Wallace Roney (1960–2020), trumpet player and jazz musician
- Adam Schlesinger (1967–2020), musician, bass player for Fountains of Wayne and Ivy
- Duncan Sheik (1969–2026), singer-songwriter, composer and actor, known for his 1996 single, "Barely Breathing" and the musical Spring Awakening
- Ty Taylor (born 1967), guitarist and vocalist of R&B group Dakota Moon; contestant on the reality TV show Rock Star: INXS
- Dennis "Dee Tee" Thomas (1951–2021), alto saxophone player, flautist, and percussionist, who was a founding member of R&B/soul/funk Kool & the Gang
- Steve Turre (born 1948), jazz trombonist and member of Saturday Night Live band since 1984
- Joe Walsh (born 1947), musician/songwriter for the James Gang and the Eagles
- Carol Williams, disco musician
- Reggie Workman (born 1937), jazz musician
- Jenny Owen Youngs (born 1981), singer/songwriter

== Business ==
- George Batten (1854–1918), advertising executive whose firm was part of the merger that created what is now BBDO
- Clarence Birdseye (1886–1956), inventor, entrepreneur and naturalist who is considered to be the founder of the modern frozen food industry
- John C. Bogle (1929–2019), founder and CEO of The Vanguard Group, a pioneer in financial investments
- John J. Cali (1918–2014), real estate developer
- Israel Crane (1774–1858), merchant
- J. Clydesdale Cushman (1887–1955), businessman who co-founded the real estate firm Cushman & Wakefield in 1917
- Allen B. DuMont (1901–1965), television pioneer and inventor who created the DuMont Television Network
- Stephen Glasser (1943–2022), American publisher who founded the Legal Times
- Floyd Hall (born 1935), CEO of Kmart
- Charles B. Johnson (born 1933), businessman
- Ken Kurson (born 1968), political consultant, writer and journalist, who was editor-in-chief of The New York Observer between 2013 and 2017
- Geraldine Laybourne (born 1947), former TV executive and entrepreneur, co-founder of Nickelodeon and Oxygen cable networks
- Benjamin Moore (1905–1917), co-founder with his brother Robert of Benjamin Moore & Co, in Brooklyn in 1883; lived in Upper Montclair
- Guy T. Viskniskki (1876–1949), newspaper editor and news executive who founded the World War I edition of the Stars and Stripes newspaper while serving as a U.S. Army officer in France with the American Expeditionary Force
- Bernard Wakefield (c. 1883–1967), British-American executive who co-founded the real estate firm Cushman & Wakefield in 1917

== Government, politics, law and military ==
- Bradley Abelow (born 1958), New Jersey State Treasurer, appointed by Governor of New Jersey Jon Corzine
- Steve Adubato Jr. (born 1957), talk show host and former member of the New Jersey General Assembly
- W. I. Lincoln Adams (1865–1946), politician, banker and soldier
- Tom Ammiano (born 1941), politician and LGBT rights activist who served as a member of the California State Assembly and on the San Francisco Board of Supervisors
- Norman Atkins (1934–2010), Canadian Senator and a political figure in Canada
- Jane Barus (1892–1977), member of the Constitutional convention that formulated the 1947 New Jersey State Constitution
- Lezli Baskerville (born 1956), lawyer who has served as president and CEO of the National Association for Equal Opportunity in Higher Education
- Wendy Benchley (born 1941), marine and environmental conservation advocate and former elected official who was the wife of author Peter Benchley
- Bill Bradley (born 1942), former forward for the New York Knicks who served as U.S. Senator from New Jersey
- Raymond A. Brown (1915–2009), attorney whose clients included Black Liberation Army member Assata Shakur, boxer Rubin "Hurricane" Carter and "Dr. X" physician Mario Jascalevich
- Gilbert S. Carpenter (1836–1904), US Army brigadier general, retired in Montclair
- Christopher Cerf (born c. 1955), former Commissioner of the New Jersey Department of Education who is the state-appointed Superintendent of the Newark Public Schools
- Shirley Emehelu (born 1977), attorney and politician currently serving as the 5th lieutenant governor and 36th secretary of State of New Jersey
- Bayard H. Faulkner (1894–1983), mayor and chairman of the Commission on Municipal Government that created New Jersey's Optional Municipal Charter Law, better known eponymously as the Faulkner Act
- Paul J. Fishman (born 1957), United States Attorney for the District of New Jersey
- Edwin J. Godfrey (1932–2002), lieutenant general in the United States Marine Corps who served as Commander of Fleet Marine Force, Pacific
- William H. Gray (1941–2013), Congressman who served as head of the United Negro College Fund
- Harold Harrison (1872–1953), businessman and politician who served in the Minnesota House of Representatives from 1937 to 1940 and in the Minnesota Senate from 1941 to 1950
- Lonna Hooks, Secretary of State of New Jersey from 1994 to 1998, under Governor of New Jersey Christine Todd Whitman
- Jeh Johnson (born 1957), lawyer and former government official who was United States Secretary of Homeland Security from 2013 to 2017
- Jim Johnson (born 1960), former Department of Treasury official and activist
- J. Erik Jonsson (1901–1995), businessman, philanthropist, and mayor of Dallas, Texas, who was reared in Montclair
- Don Katz (born 1952), founder and executive chairman of Audible
- Sean T. Kean (born 1963), politician who represents the 11th Legislative District in the New Jersey General Assembly
- Arthur Kinoy (1920–2003), activist lawyer who was part of the team that represented the Chicago Seven
- Howard Krongard (born 1940), head of the Office of the Inspector General of the Department of State
- Archie Lochhead (1892–1971), first director of the Exchange Stabilization Fund and President of the Universal Trading Corporation
- Ellen Malcolm (born 1947), activist with a long career in American politics, particularly in political fundraising, who founded EMILY's List in 1985
- Benjamin Chavis Muhammad (born 1948), civil rights activist
- Imani Oakley (born 1990), 2022 candidate for Congress in New Jersey's 10th congressional district in the U.S. House of Representatives, former legislative director for New Jersey branch of the Working Families Party and political organizer
- Price D. Rice (1916–1999), U.S. Army Air Corps/U.S. Air Force officer/full-bird Colonel and member of the Tuskegee Airmen
- Steve Santarsiero (born 1965, class of 1983), politician who has served in the Pennsylvania State Senate
- Mikie Sherrill (born 1972), former United States Navy pilot, prosecutor, and U.S. representative from New Jersey's 11th district who serves as New Jersey's 57th governor
- Lucy Stone (1818–1893), feminist and suffragist
- Benjamin Strong Jr. (1872–1928), governor of the Federal Reserve Bank of New York
- Edward W. Townsend (1855–1942), represented New Jersey's 6th congressional district, 1911–1913, and the 10th district, 1913–1915
- James Wallwork (1930–2024), politician who served in both houses of the New Jersey Legislature
- Norman H. White (1871–1951), publisher and politician who served in the Massachusetts House of Representatives

== Sports ==
- Josh Hines-Allen (born 1997), outside linebacker for the Jacksonville Jaguars
- Jaden Craig, American football quarterback for the Harvard Crimson
- Declan Cronin (born 1997), pitcher for the Chicago White Sox and Miami Marlins
- William Andre (1931–2019), modern pentathlete who won a silver medal in the team event at the 1956 Summer Olympics
- Yael Averbuch (born 1986), soccer player
- Me'Lisa Barber (born 1980), track and field sprint athlete
- Dale Berra (born 1956), infielder who played for the Pittsburgh Pirates, New York Yankees and Houston Astros
- Tim Berra (born 1951), wide receiver who played in the NFL for the Baltimore Colts
- Yogi Berra (1925–2015), baseball player and manager with the New York Yankees and New York Mets
- Bob Bradley (born 1958), soccer coach who was head coach of the United States men's national soccer team from 2006 to 2011
- Bill Byrne (1940–2021), American football guard who played professional football for the Philadelphia Eagles
- David Caldwell (born 1987), football safety for the Hamilton Tiger-Cats, previously with the Indianapolis Colts
- Peter A. Carlesimo (1915–2003), basketball coach
- Wally Choice (1932–2018), basketball player who played professionally with the Harlem Globetrotters
- Leonard S. Coleman Jr. (born 1949), last president of the National League, serving from 1994 until 1999 when the position was eliminated by Major League Baseball
- Te'a Cooper (born 1997), professional basketball player for the Phoenix Mercury of the Women's National Basketball Association
- Kyle Copeland (born 1961), former professional tennis player
- Brandon Costner (born 1987), professional basketball player for Patriots BBC of the Basketball Africa League
- Tony Costner (born 1962), former professional basketball player who was selected by the Washington Bullets in the 2nd round (34th overall) of the 1984 NBA draft before playing in Europe
- Larry Doby (1923–2003), second African-American to play professional baseball in Major League Baseball
- Hollie Donan (1928–2014), defensive tackle who played college football for Princeton University and was inducted into the College Football Hall of Fame in 1984
- Avery Ellis (born 1994), professional Canadian football defensive lineman for the Ottawa Redblacks of the Canadian Football League
- Alex Ferguson (1897–1976), right-handed pitcher; played for the New York Yankees, Boston Red Sox, Washington Senators, Philadelphia Phillies, and Brooklyn Robins; played in the 1925 World Series
- Don Garber (born 1957), commissioner of Major League Soccer
- Jed Graef (born 1942), gold medal winner in the men's 200-meter backstroke at the 1964 Summer Olympics in Tokyo
- Jesse Grupper (born 1997), Olympic rock climber
- Mule Haas (1903–1974), Major League Baseball centerfielder from 1925 to 1938
- Alen Hadzic (born 1991), former épée fencer
- Myisha Hines-Allen (born 1996), professional basketball player who plays for the Minnesota Lynx of the WNBA
- Billy "Brud" Johnson (1918–2006), New York Yankees third baseman who played nine seasons in the majors and missed two seasons for military service during World War II
- Rees Jones (born 1941), golf course architect
- Robert Trent Jones Jr. (born 1939), golf course architect
- Robert Trent Jones Sr. (1906–2000), golf course architect; moved here from England where he married and raised two sons, both following in their father's footsteps
- Sean Jones (born 1962), defensive end for the Raiders, Oilers, and the Packers; played in the 1997 Super Bowl championship
- Rich Kenah (born 1970), middle-distance runner; won bronze medals over 800 meters at the 1997 World Indoor Championships and 1997 World Championships in Athens; member of the US Team at the 2000 Summer Olympics in Sydney
- Kenneth W. Keuffel (1923 –2006), American football coach who was the 25th head football coach of the Wabash Little Giants football team
- Aubrey Lewis (1935–2001), The Star-Ledger's Football Player of the Century who was a football and track star with the Notre Dame Fighting Irish
- Dave Meads (born 1964), pitcher for the Houston Astros who had an 8–4 career record
- John McMullen (1918–2005), naval architect and marine engineer; former owner of the New Jersey Devils and Houston Astros
- Diamond Miller (born 2001), professional basketball player for the Minnesota Lynx of the WNBA
- Jeff Mills (born 1968), linebacker who played four seasons in the NFL with the San Diego Chargers and Denver Broncos
- Mackenzie Molner (born 1988), chess grandmaster and instructor
- Scott Niedermayer (born 1973), retired hockey defenseman who played for the New Jersey Devils and Anaheim Ducks
- R.J. Oben (born 2001), American football defensive end for the Notre Dame Fighting Irish
- Jacquie Pierri (born 1990), ice hockey player who competed as a member of the Italian women's national ice hockey team that participated at the 2026 Winter Olympics
- Jamar Ricketts (born 2001), professional soccer player who plays for Major League Soccer club San Jose Earthquakes
- Patience Sherman (born 1946), former competition swimmer who competed in the 1964 Summer Olympics in Tokyo
- Ron Simpson, former professional basketball player
- William Steinitz (1836–1900), one of the greatest chess masters of the 19th century; first world champion; known as the "Bohemian Caesar"
- Michael Strahan (born 1971), NFL defensive end for the New York Giants; holds single season sack record
- Dick Tarrant (born 1928), head men's basketball coach at the University of Richmond from 1981 to 1993
- Willie Taylor (born 1955), wide receiver for the Green Bay Packers
- Bob Torrey (1878–1941), football player and coach who was the captain of the University of Pennsylvania's unbeaten teams of 1904 and 1905 and was elected to the College Football Hall of Fame in 1971
- David Tyree (born 1980), NFL wide receiver for the New York Giants who was a 1998 graduate of Montclair High School
- Ingrid Wells (born 1989), soccer player
- Earl Williams (1948–2013), baseball player; National League's rookie of the Year in 1971
- Isaiah Williams (born 1987), wide receiver who played in the Canadian Football League for the Edmonton Eskimos
- Dainius Zubrus (born 1978), forward for New Jersey Devils

== Other ==
- Jane Allen Campbell (1865–1938), American heiress and Italian princess of San Faustino
- Paul Cushing Child (1902–1994), husband of chef Julia Child, who introduced his wife to fine cuisine, which began her legendary career
- Victor E. Engstrom (1914–2000), philatelist
- Vladimir Guryev and Lydia Guryev, a.k.a. Richard and Cynthia Murphy, arrested in their Montclair home June 2010 by FBI; admitted in court to being agents of the Russian Federation and pleaded guilty to conspiracy to act as unregistered agents; expelled with eight others in a prisoner exchange with Russia
- Florence Merriam Johnson (c. 1876–1954), American Red Cross nurse during World War I, received Florence Nightingale Medal
- Isaac Newton Lewis (1858–1931), soldier and inventor who created the Lewis gun
- Mizkif (born 1995), Twitch streamer
- Pearl Grigsby Richardson (1896–1983), educator and clubwoman
