= Grigsby =

Grigsby is an English surname derived from the name of a "lost" medieval village in Lincolnshire recorded in the Domesday Book as "Gredbi", which was itself a development of the Old Norse "Griot-byr". The spelling "Grigsby" is believed to stem from a common progenitor, John Grigsby (1623–1730). Most Grigsbys in the United States trace their descent from this 17th-century landowner, in Stafford County, Virginia.

== People named Grigsby ==
- Andrew Jackson Grigsby (1819–1895), colonel for the Stonewall Brigade for the Confederate States Army in the American Civil War, and commander in the Battle of Antietam
- Beverly Grigsby (1928–2022), American musician
- Bill Grigsby (1922–2011), announcer for the Kansas City Chiefs
- Boomer Grigsby (born 1981), American football fullback
- Charles Grigsby (born 1978), American Idol contestant
- Chuck Grigsby (1928–2003), American basketball player
- Denver Grigsby (1901–1973), Major League Baseball outfielder
- Elisenda Grigsby, American mathematician
- Gary Grigsby, American game designer
- George Barnes Grigsby (1874–1962), delegate to the United States House of Representatives from the Territory of Alaska
- Hugh Blair Grigsby (1806–1881), Virginia statesman and historian
- J. Eugene Grigsby (1918–2013), American multimedia artist
- Jill S. Grigsby (born 1954), American sociologist
- John Grigsby, captain in the United States Army, leader in the Bear Flag Revolt and the Grigsby-Ide Party
- Lewis Grigsby (1867–1932), American real estate investor
- Margaret E. Grigsby (1923–2009), African American woman physician
- Melvin Grigsby (1845–1917), Attorney General of South Dakota
- Michael Grigsby (1936–2013), British filmmaker
- Nic Grigsby (born 1988), Canadian football running back
- Nicholas Grigsby (American football) (born 1992), American football linebacker
- Noel Grigsby (born 1991), American football wide receiver
- Otis Grigsby (born 1980), American football defensive end
- Pearl Grigsby Richardson (1896–1983), American educator, clubwoman
- Sioux K. Grigsby (1873–1968), Lieutenant Governor of South Dakota
- Tamara Grigsby (1974–2016), representative for the Wisconsin State Assembly
- Wayne Grigsby (born 1947), Canadian screenwriter and producer
- Will Grigsby (born 1970), American IBF light flyweight champion boxer

== See also ==
- Grigsby, Kentucky
