= Upper Montclair, New Jersey =

Place in Essex County, New Jersey, United States

- Census-designated place
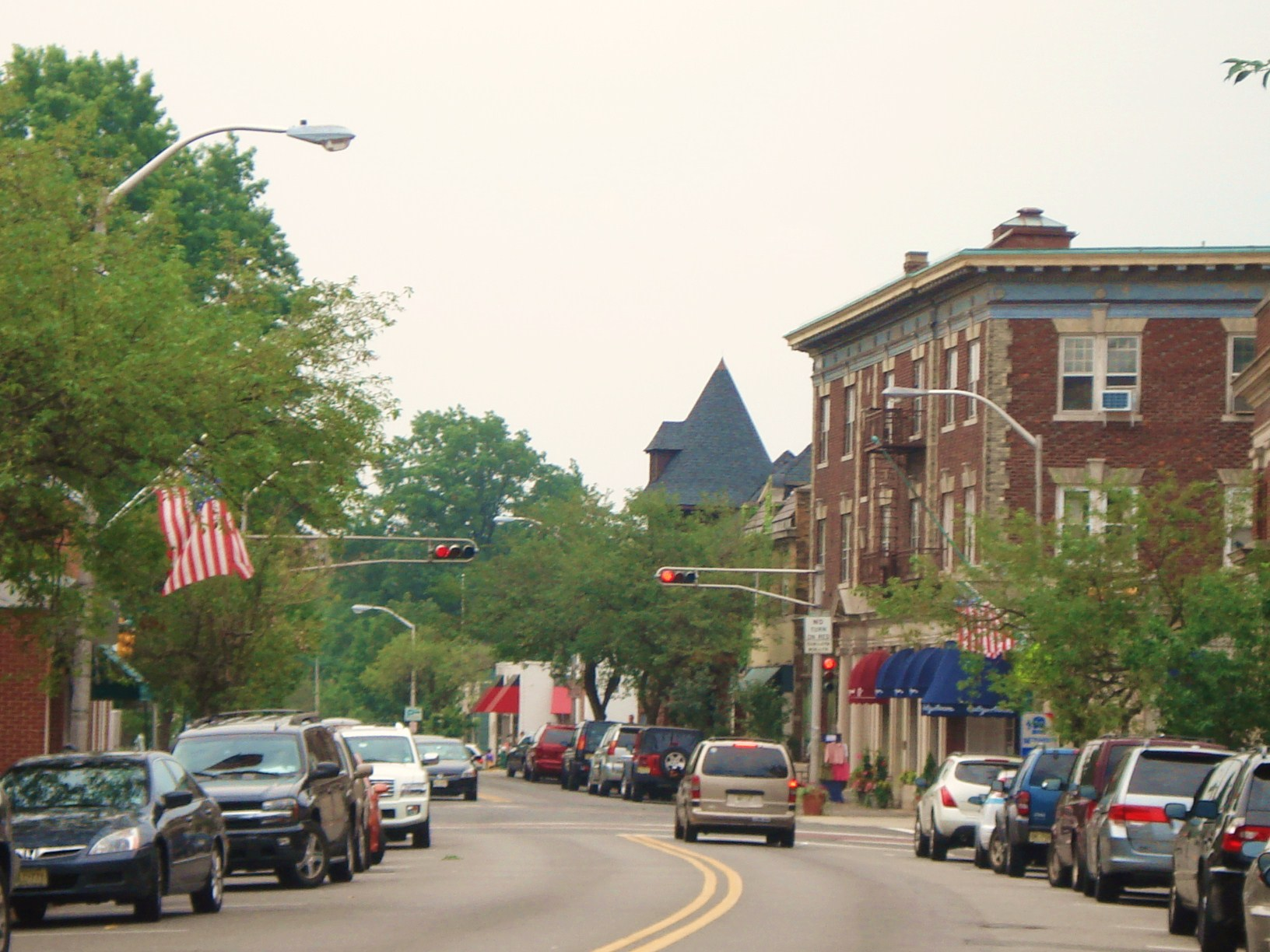
- Upper Montclair business district

- Location in Essex County Location in New Jersey Location in the United States
- Coordinates: 40.842576°N 74.201302°W
- Country: United States
- State: New Jersey
- County: Essex
- Township: Montclair

Area
  - Total: 2.38 sq mi (6.17 km^{2})
  - Land: 2.38 sq mi (6.16 km^{2})
  - Water: 0 sq mi (0.00 km^{2}) 0.04%
- Elevation: 322 ft (98 m)

Population (2020)
  - Total: 13,146
  - Density: 5,523.0/sq mi (2,132.43/km^{2})
- Time zone: UTC−05:00 (Eastern (EST))
  - Summer (DST): UTC−04:00 (EDT)
- ZIP Code: 07043
- Area codes: 862/973
- FIPS code: 34-75020
- GNIS feature ID: 2584034

Upper Montclair is a census-designated place (CDP), unincorporated community and neighborhood within Montclair in Essex County, in the U.S. state of New Jersey. As of the 2020 census, Upper Montclair had a population of 13,146. The area is served as United States Postal Service ZIP Code 07043. It is often misperceived, even by Montclair residents, to be a separate municipality from Montclair, perhaps aided by this postal designation.

== History ==
The area now known as Upper Montclair was first developed in the early 18th century as a rural community known as Speertown, named for John Speer, an early Dutch settler. The area remained a rural hamlet for much of that century. The modern township of Montclair, including Upper Montclair, was incorporated in 1868 from part of Bloomfield Township.

== Geography ==
According to the United States Census Bureau, the CDP had a total area of 2.536 square miles (6.569 km^{2}), including 2.535 square miles (6.567 km^{2}) of land and 0.001 square miles (0.002 km^{2}) of water (0.04%).

Upper Montclair is north of Watchung Avenue, covering 40.2% of Montclair township's area.

== Demographics ==
Historical population
Census	Pop.	Note	%±
2010	11,565		—
2020	13,146		13.7%
U.S. Decennial Census

Upper Montclair first appeared as a census designated place in the 2010 U.S. census formed from part of the deleted whole-township Montclair CDP.

=== Racial and ethnic composition ===
Upper Montclair CDP, New Jersey – Racial and ethnic composition Note: the US Census treats Hispanic/Latino as an ethnic category. This table excludes Latinos from the racial categories and assigns them to a separate category. Hispanics/Latinos may be of any race.
Race / Ethnicity (NH = Non-Hispanic)	Pop 2010	Pop 2020	% 2010	% 2020
White alone (NH)	9,264	8,870	80.10%	67.47%
Black or African American alone (NH)	715	1,509	6.18%	11.48%
Native American or Alaska Native alone (NH)	9	2	0.08%	0.02%
Asian alone (NH)	479	721	4.14%	5.48%
Native Hawaiian or Pacific Islander alone (NH)	0	2	0.00%	0.02%
Other race alone (NH)	65	95	0.56%	0.72%
Mixed race or Multiracial (NH)	384	822	3.32%	6.25%
Hispanic or Latino (any race)	649	1,125	5.61%	8.56%
Total	11,565	13,146	100.00%	100.00%

=== 2020 census ===
As of the 2020 census, Upper Montclair had a population of 13,146. The median age was 38.3 years. 26.4% of residents were under the age of 18 and 12.7% of residents were 65 years of age or older. For every 100 females there were 92.0 males, and for every 100 females age 18 and over there were 87.8 males age 18 and over.

100.0% of residents lived in urban areas, while 0.0% lived in rural areas.

There were 4,114 households in Upper Montclair, of which 46.6% had children under the age of 18 living in them. Of all households, 69.1% were married-couple households, 9.9% were households with a male householder and no spouse or partner present, and 17.7% were households with a female householder and no spouse or partner present. About 17.5% of all households were made up of individuals and 8.6% had someone living alone who was 65 years of age or older.

There were 4,214 housing units, of which 2.4% were vacant. The homeowner vacancy rate was 0.4% and the rental vacancy rate was 4.0%.

=== 2010 census ===
The 2010 United States census counted 11,565 people, 4,178 households, and 3,146 families in the CDP. The population density was 4,561.4 per square mile (1,761.2/km^{2}). There were 4,310 housing units at an average density of 1,699.9 per square mile (656.3/km^{2}). The racial makeup was 83.99% (9,713) White, 6.46% (747) Black or African American, 0.10% (12) Native American, 4.18% (483) Asian, 0.00% (0) Pacific Islander, 1.31% (151) from other races, and 3.97% (459) from two or more races. Hispanic or Latino of any race were 5.61% (649) of the population.

Of the 4,178 households, 44.2% had children under the age of 18; 64.8% were married couples living together; 7.9% had a female householder with no husband present and 24.7% were non-families. Of all households, 20.3% were made up of individuals and 8.3% had someone living alone who was 65 years of age or older. The average household size was 2.76 and the average family size was 3.23.

29.9% of the population were under the age of 18, 4.3% from 18 to 24, 20.8% from 25 to 44, 33.7% from 45 to 64, and 11.3% who were 65 years of age or older. The median age was 42.1 years. For every 100 females, the population had 90.2 males. For every 100 females ages 18 and older there were 85.7 males.

== Education ==
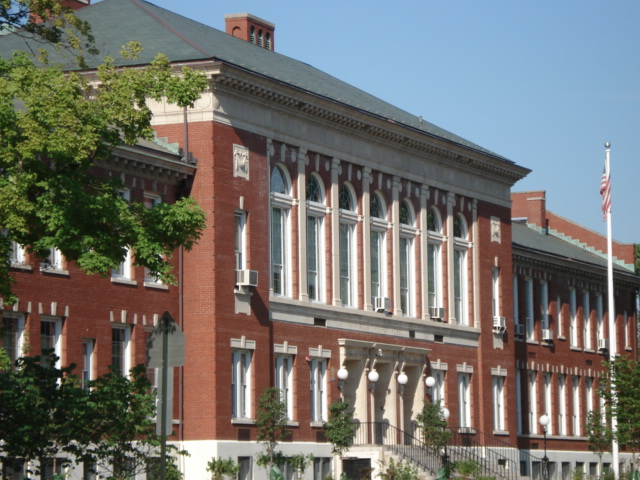
Mt. Hebron Middle School

Upper Montclair is in the township of Montclair and is served by the Montclair Public Schools. More than a quarter of the district's schools are found in Upper Montclair. These include Bradford Elementary and Northeast Elementary, which are two of seven elementary schools in Montclair, and Mt. Hebron Middle School, renamed Buzz Aldrin Middle School in September 2016 in honor of the astronaut, who grew up in Montclair, which is one of three Montclair middle schools. Part of Montclair State University's campus is in Upper Montclair.

Upper Montclair is also home to several private schools. They include Lacordaire Academy, Lacordaire Academy Elementary Division and St. Cassian School.

== Transportation ==
Upper Montclair is well connected to the rest of New Jersey and New York City on account of its transportation infrastructure. Public transportation options in Upper Montclair are buses and trains, both provided by New Jersey Transit, although commuter bus service to Manhattan was also provided until April 2023 by DeCamp Bus Lines.

=== Rail ===
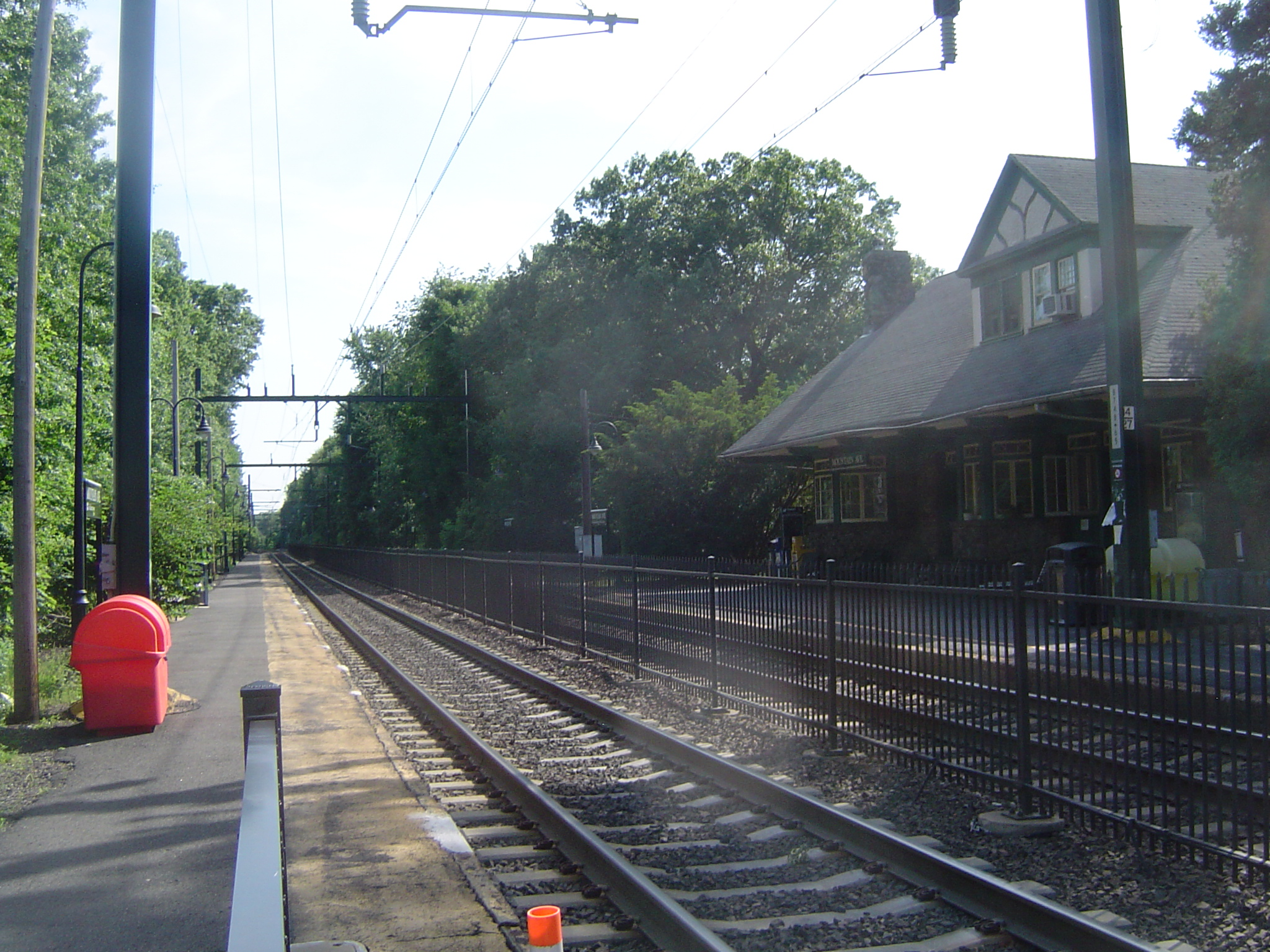
Mountain Avenue station

New Jersey Transit's Montclair-Boonton Line runs through the neighborhood of Upper Montclair. In Upper Montclair there are train stations of the overall Montclair total of seven. This is because the stations in Montclair are very close together, sometimes under a mile apart. New Jersey Transit train stations are Upper Montclair, Mountain Avenue, and Montclair Heights. From 1889 to 1928, Valley Road, a major road, had an electric trolley line.

=== Bus ===
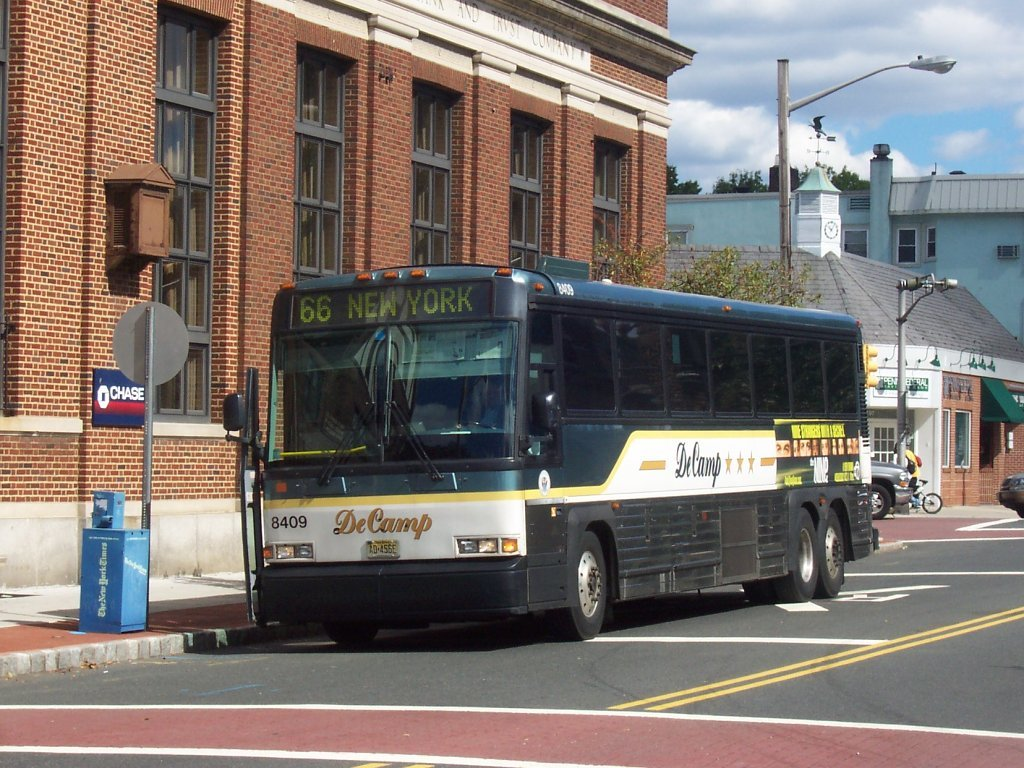
DeCamp Bus Lines #66, stopping in Upper Montclair

The area is also on NJ Transit's bus route 28, which goes from Montclair State University or Willowbrook Mall along Valley Road through Montclair, Glen Ridge and Bloomfield, to Downtown Newark. This bus route goes along Valley road for the great majority of its path in Upper Montclair, in some places on the route of Decamp's Number 66. Also, two DeCamp Bus Lines routes took commuters to the Port Authority Bus Terminal in New York until April 2023. Some Number 33 buses went along Grove Street, on the Eastern edge of the neighborhood, while number 66 went along Valley Road, in the West, then the central Park Street.

=== Road ===
Upper Montclair has road connections to the rest of Montclair, Cedar Grove, Little Falls, Clifton and Bloomfield. Just north of the neighborhood's border are U.S. Route 46 and Route 3.

== Commerce ==
The commercial zone at the center of Upper Montclair, Upper Montclair Business District is home to several restaurants and shops. Unlike many of Montclair's other commercial zones, it has outlets of several major chain stores. In 2009–2010, several new national and local merchants opened in the area. Montclair Station Restaurant & Bar was opened in the historic Upper Montclair train station. Upper Montclair also has both a park, Anderson Park, and a railway station, Upper Montclair, nearby. There is a post office here.

== Parks ==
Upper Montclair is home to many parks and nature reserves. Within Upper Montclair there are Anderson Park, Yantacaw Brook Park, the Bonsal Nature Reserve, Mountainside Park, the Presby Memorial Iris Gardens, and parts of Mills Reservation and Brookdale Park. In addition, Upper Montclair has the Mountainside Public Pool, which is the largest of the three public pools in Montclair.

Upper Montclair also has Immaculate Conception Cemetery and Mount Hebron Cemetery.

== Notable people ==
People who were born in, residents of, or otherwise closely associated with Upper Montclair include:

Aldrin walks on the surface of the Moon during Apollo 11.

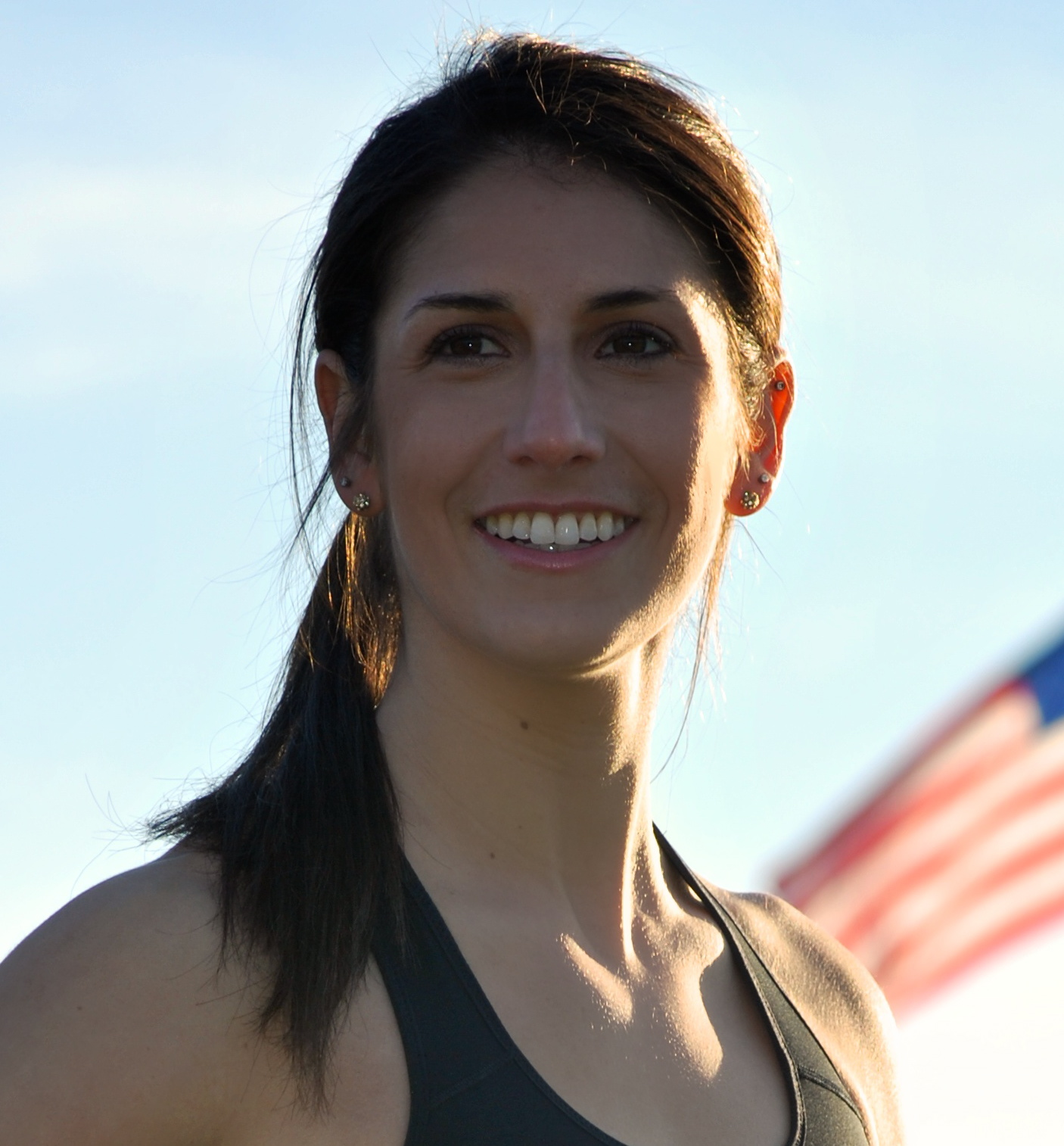
Yael Averbuch

- Buzz Aldrin (born 1930), NASA astronaut who was the second man to walk on the Moon
- Yael Averbuch (born 1986), soccer player
- Raymond A. Brown (1915–2009), attorney whose clients included Black Liberation Army member Assata Shakur, boxer Rubin "Hurricane" Carter and "Dr. X" physician Mario Jascalevich
- Margaret Colin (born 1958), actress
- J. Clydesdale Cushman (1887–1955), businessman who co-founded the real estate firm Cushman & Wakefield in 1917
- Justin Deas (born 1948), actor
- Jesse Grupper (born 1997), Olympic rock climber
- Sterling Hayden (born 1916–1986), actor
- John Langley Howard (1902–1999), muralist, printmaker and illustrator, known for his social realism
- Howard Krongard (1940–2023), head of the Office of the Inspector General of the Department of State
- Rosemary Rice (1925–2012), actress best known for her role as Katrin on CBS-TV series Mama
- Patience Sherman (born 1946), former competition swimmer who competed in the 1964 Summer Olympics in Tokyo
- Philip Slater (1927–2013), sociologist and author
- Leo Sternbach (1908–2005), chemist who invented precursor to Valium
- Bernard Wakefield (c. 1883–1967), British-American executive who co-founded the real estate firm Cushman & Wakefield in 1917
- Joe Walsh (born 1947), singer, songwriter, composer, multi-instrumentalist and record producer
- Ingrid Wells (born 1989), soccer player

== Gallery ==
Upper Montclair Gallery

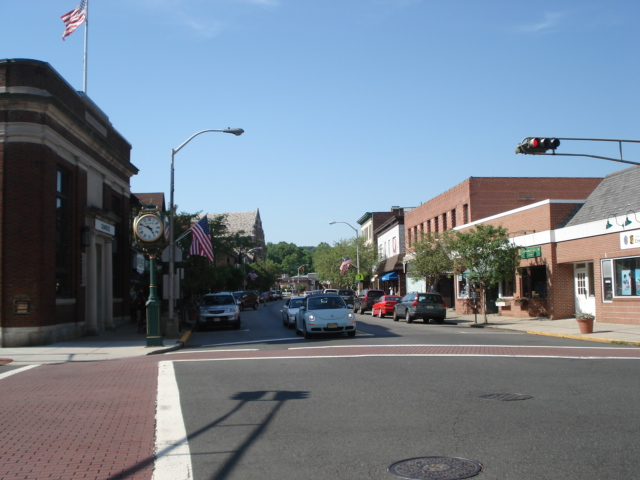
Business district at the intersection of Valley Road and Bellevue Avenue

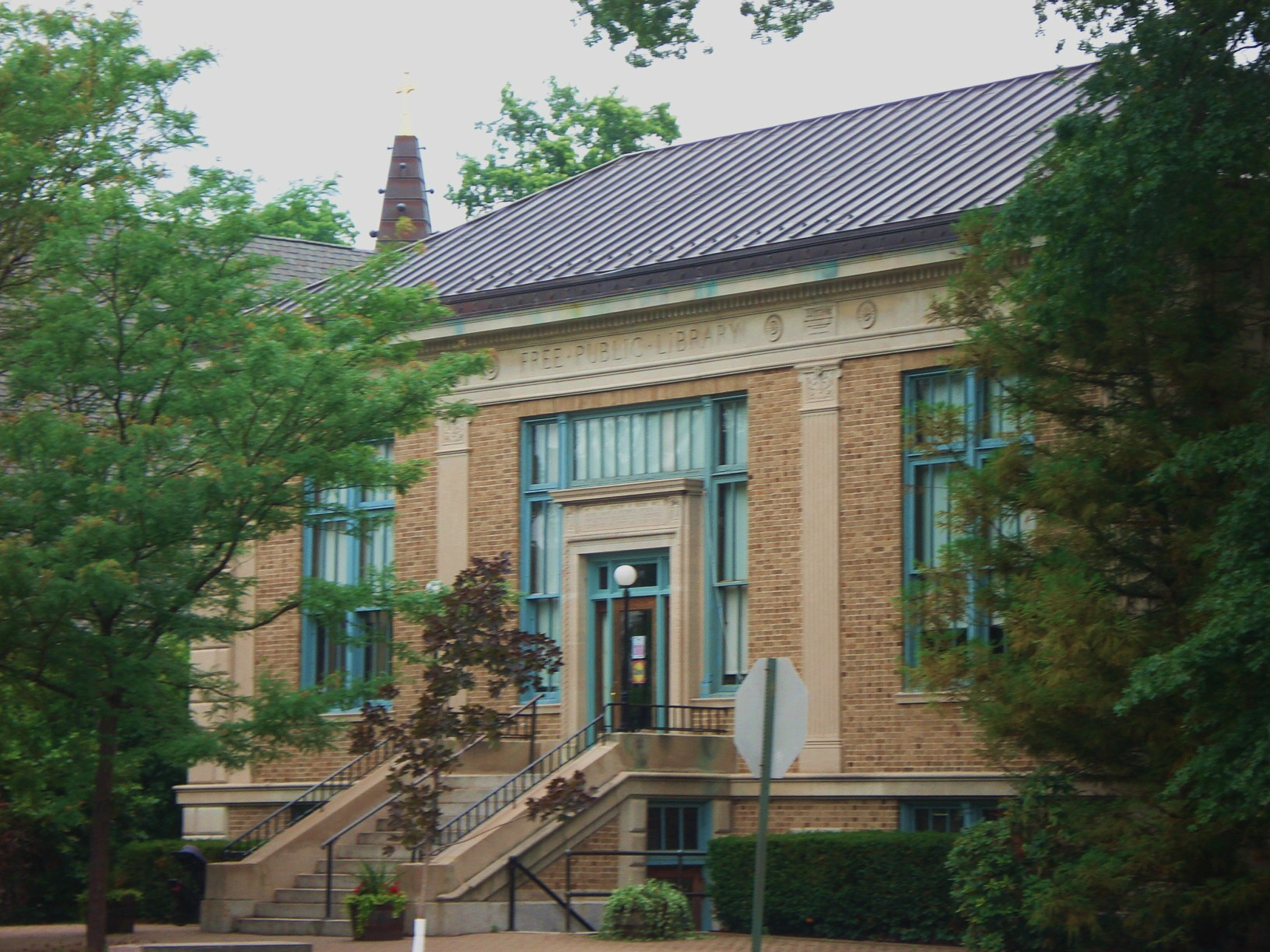
Bellevue Branch of the library

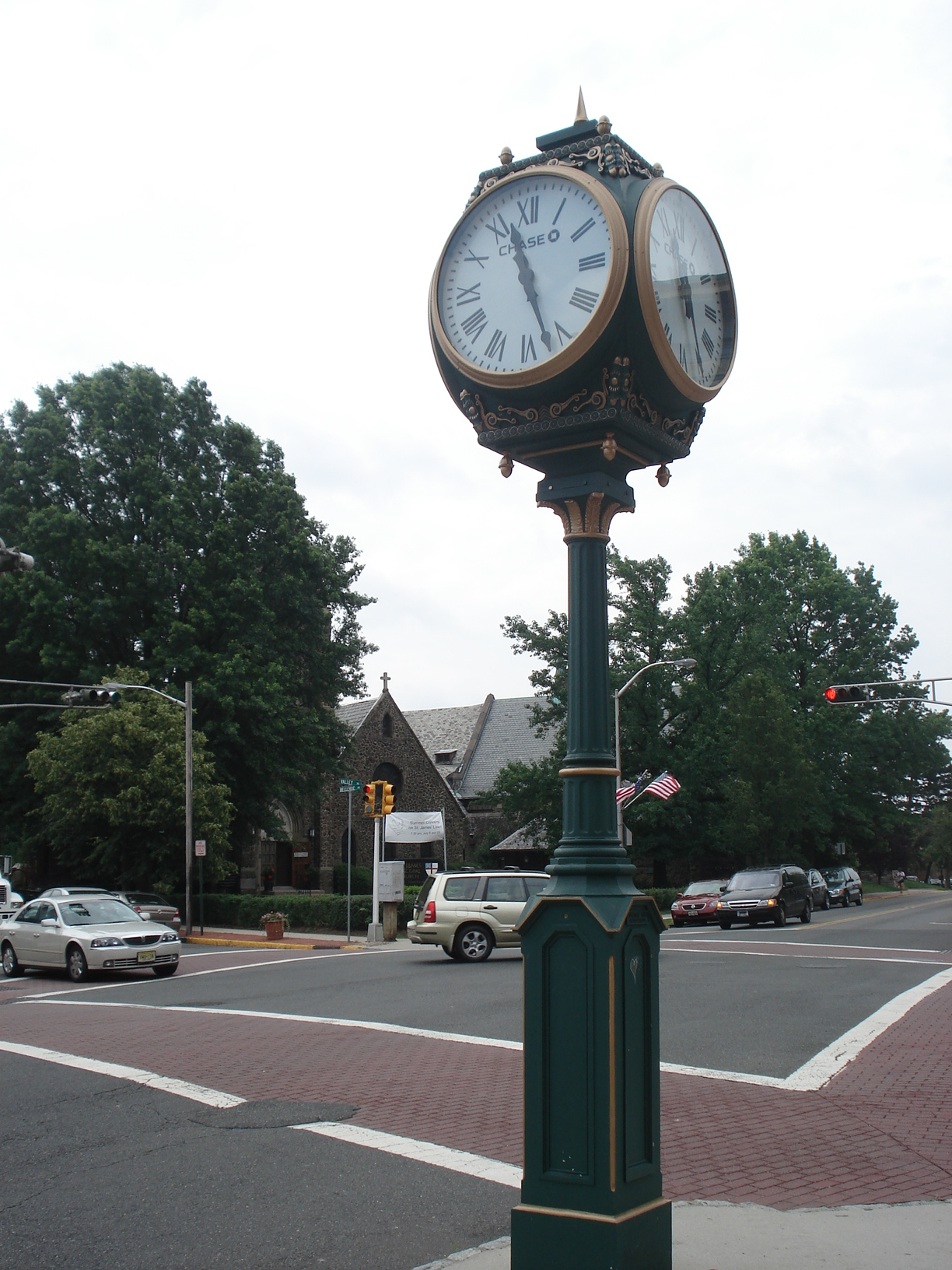
A c. 1910 landmark clock owned by Chase bank in the center of town. It was refurbished in 2004.

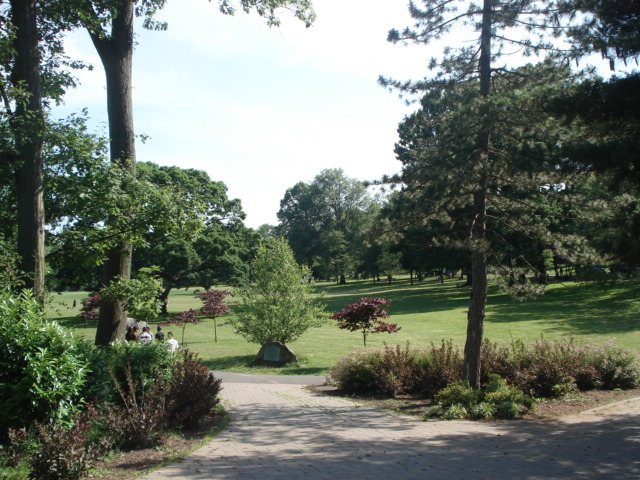
Anderson Park

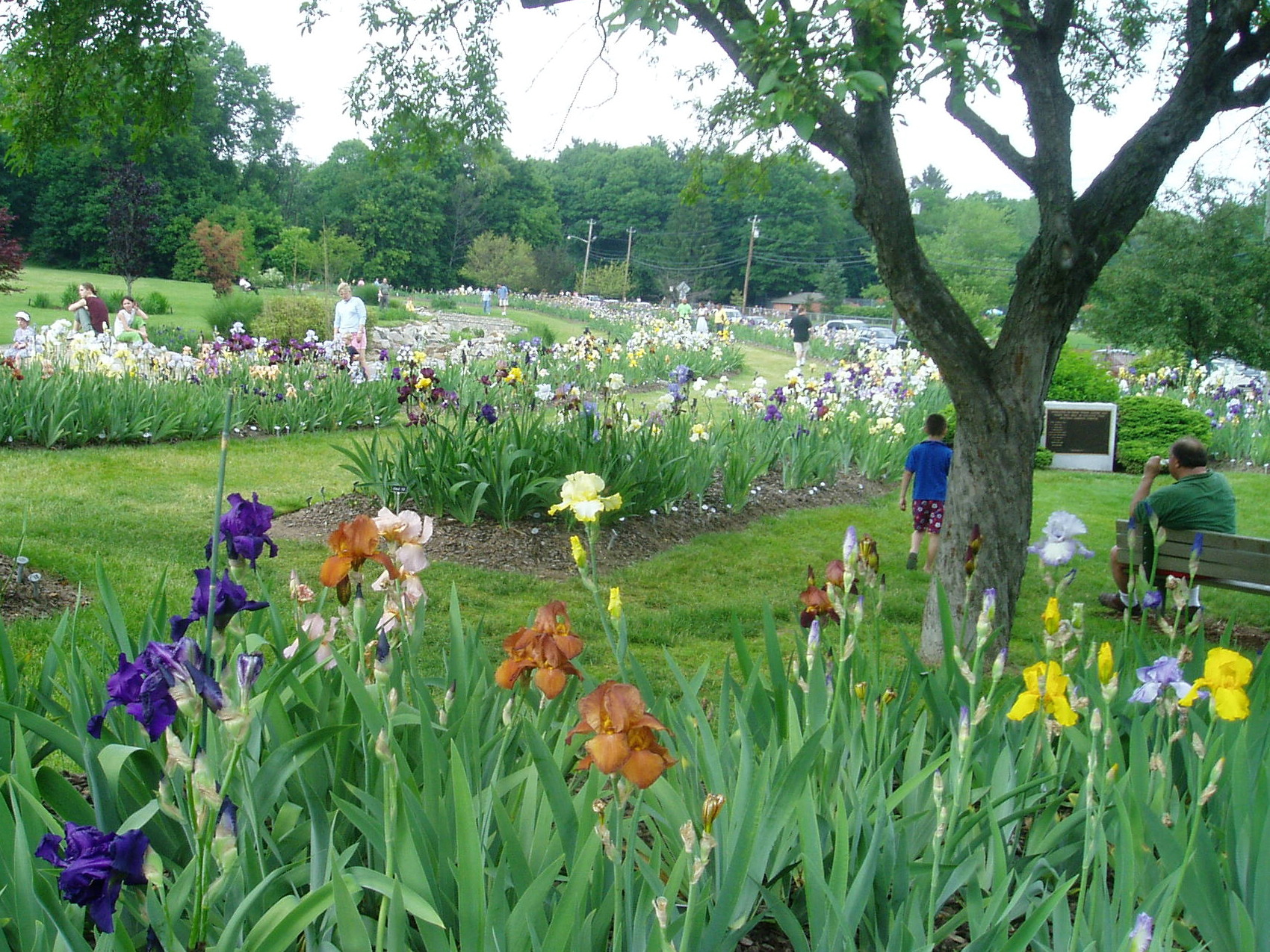
Presby Memorial Iris Gardens

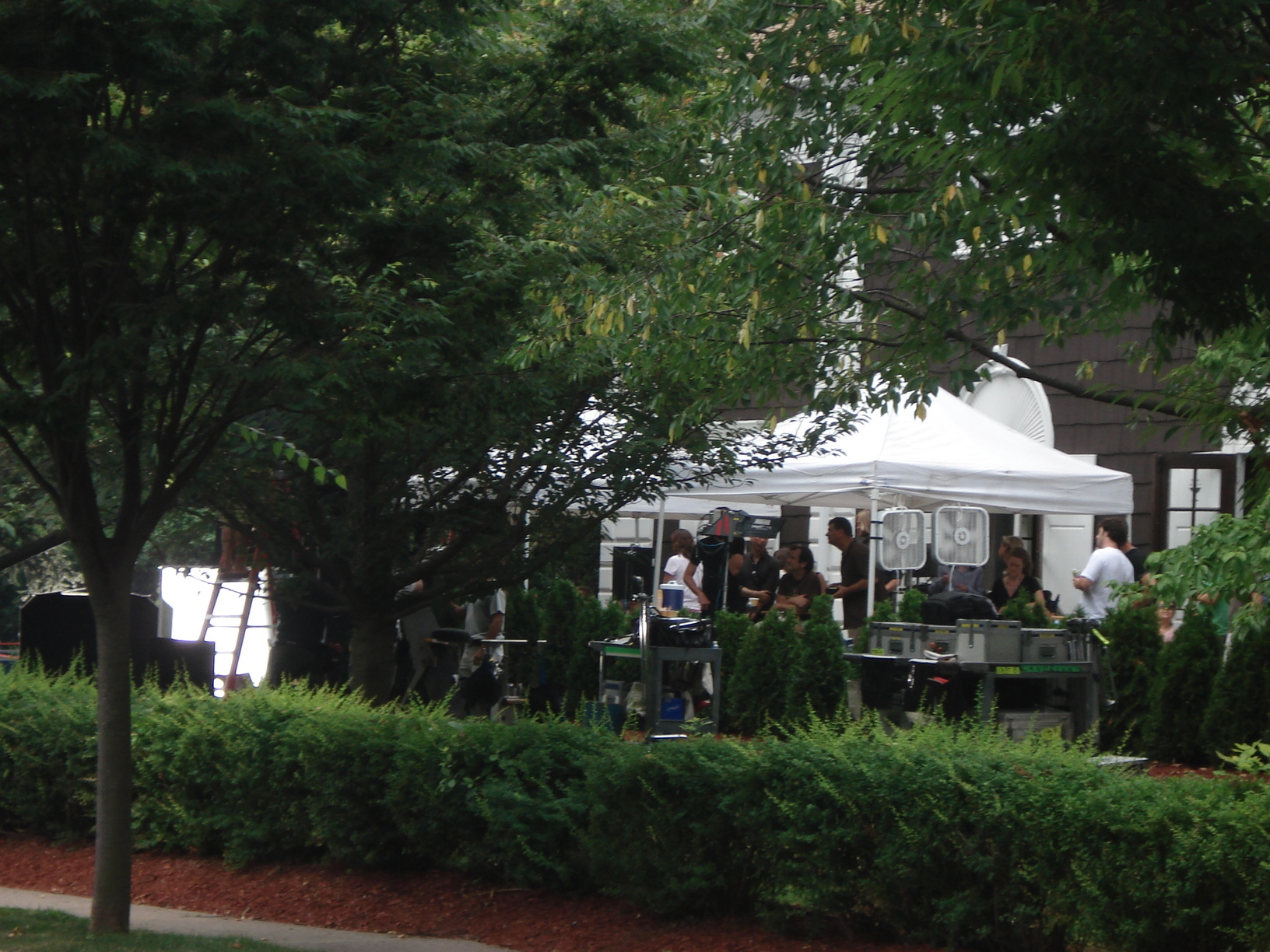
Film crew on location

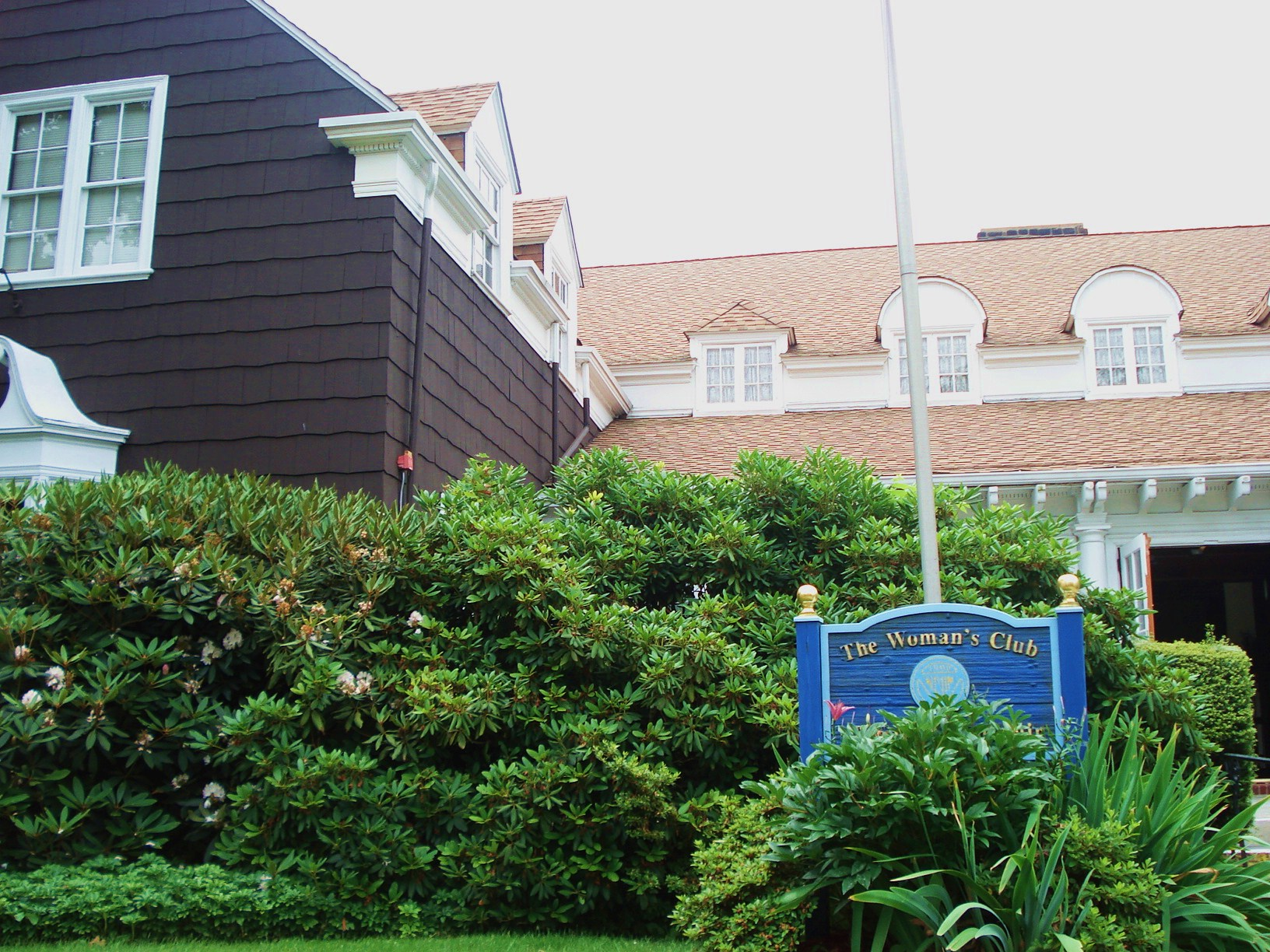
Montclair Women's Club

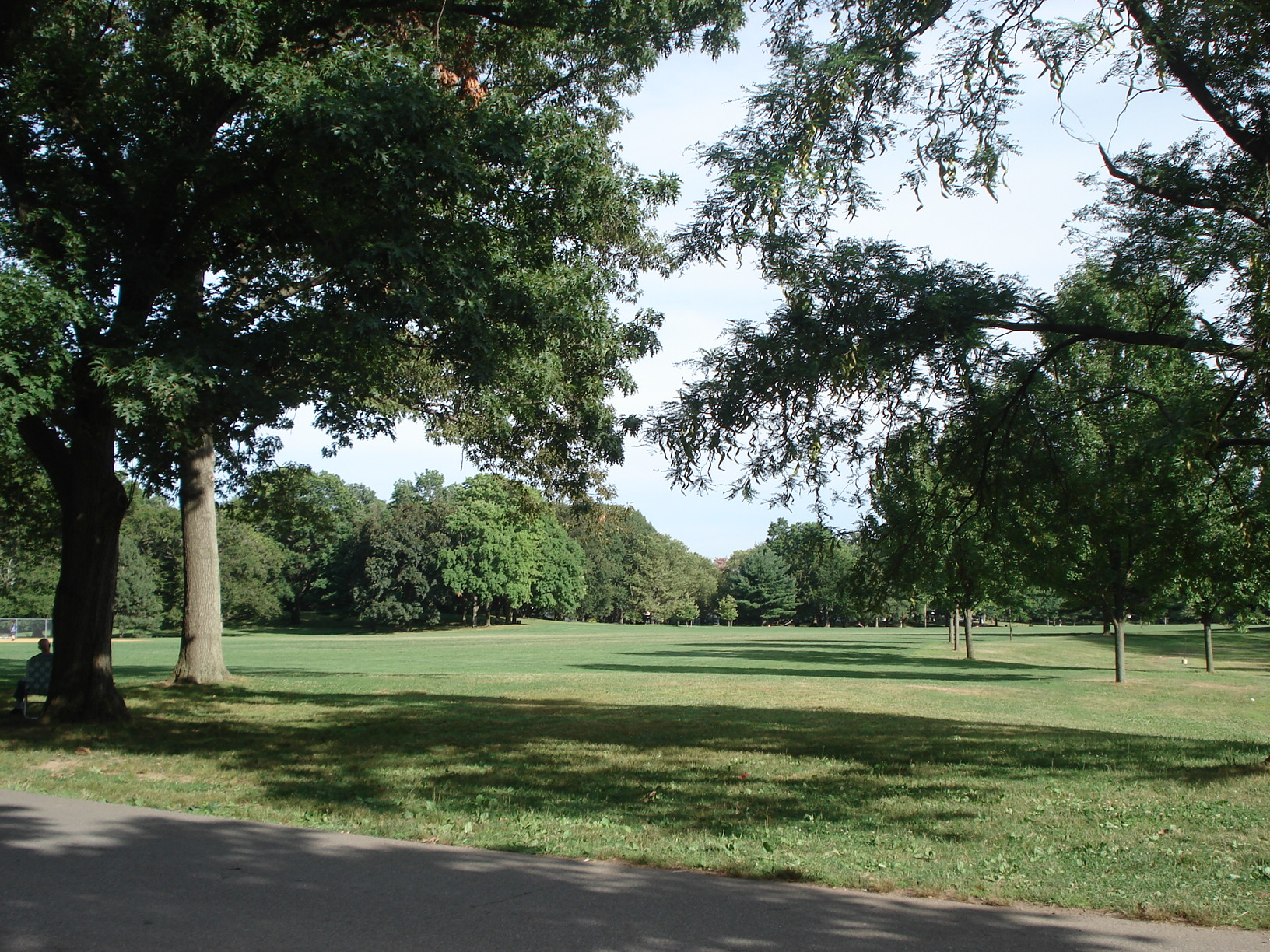
Brookdale Park
