= Business Integration Group, Inc. =

Business Integration Group, Inc. logo

Business Integration Group, Inc. was a Tempe, Arizona-based provider of Integrated Workplace Management System (IWMS) software and Professional Services. Founded in 1998, Business Integration Group, Inc. was originally a wholly owned subsidiary of commercial real estate services firm Cushman & Wakefield, Inc. In 2016, it was acquired by Accruent, LLC, of Austin, Texas.

== BigCenter IWMS ==
Business Integration Group Inc.’s platform, known as BIGCenter IWMS, is a web-based application composed of five real estate and facility management specific modules:
• Facility Center
• Portfolio Center
• Occupancy Center
• Project Center
• Green Center
Business Integration Group’s IWMS platform is offered to prospective clients under a variety of delivery options that include Software as a Service (SaaS) and License; on either a hosted or self-hosted basis. Functionality is available on an À la carte model, providing clients with the option to select the entire IWMS platform or the specific modules they wish to implement.

== Professional Services ==
In addition to its IWMS platform, Business Integration Group, Inc. offered its clients additional support via: 24*7 Facilities Helpdesk, Occupancy & Move Management, Preventive Maintenance, Resource Scheduling, Technology Assessment & Implementation Services, and Lease Administration. These services were selected separately and/or in addition to BIGCenter’s IWMS platform.

== Notable Clients ==
Business Integration Group, Inc’s IWMS solution and Professional Services were utilized by a number of private and public-sector organizations around the globe. Some of their more notable clients included Comcast, NBCUniversal, Metropolitan Life, Adobe Systems, Symantec Corporation, UBS, Novell, Prudential Financial, Fireman's Fund Insurance, Sydney Ports of Australia, and Arapahoe County, Colorado.
