= Lacordaire Academy =

Private school in Essex County, New Jersey, United States

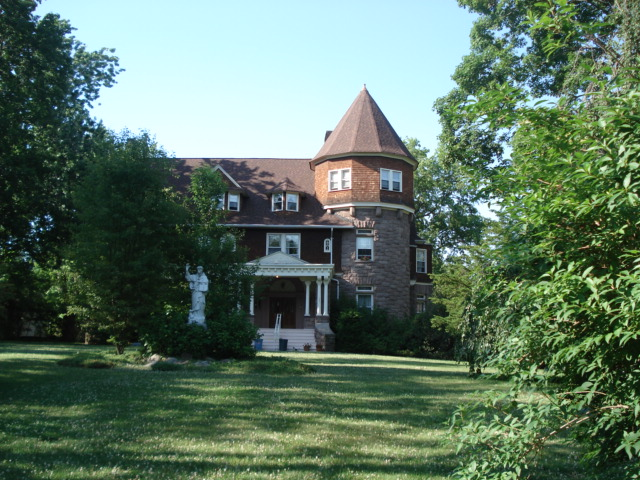
- Front Building of the Lacordaire Academy

Location
- 155 Lorraine Avenue; Montclair, (Essex County), New Jersey 07043; United States
- 40°50′30″N 74°12′5″W

Information
- Type: Private, Co-ed
- Religious affiliations: Roman Catholic, Sisters of St. Dominic
- Established: 1920
- NCES School ID: 00863533
- Head of school: Megan Mannato
- Faculty: 32.3 FTEs
- Grades: PreK-12
- Enrollment: 255 (plus 17 in PreK, as of 2023–24)
- Student to teacher ratio: 7.9:1
- Colors: Black and Red
- Team name: Lions Mascot Rory The Lion
- Accreditation: Middle States Association of Colleges and Schools
- Publication: Zephyr (literary magazine)
- Newspaper: Laco Nation
- Yearbook: Veritas
- Tuition: $21,000 (grades 9-12 for 2026–27)
- Website: www.lacordaire.net

Lacordaire Academy is a Catholic college preparatory school with a coeducational prekindergarten to eighth grade and an all girls ninth through twelfth grade student body. The Academy was established by the Sisters of St. Dominic of Caldwell, New Jersey. The school is located in the Upper Montclair section of Montclair, in Essex County, in the U.S. state of New Jersey.

Lacordaire Academy has been accredited by the New Jersey Department of Education and by the Middle States Association of Colleges and Schools Commission on Elementary and Secondary Schools since 1951 and is accredited through January 2025. The school is a member of the New Jersey Association of Independent Schools and is located within the Roman Catholic Archdiocese of Newark.

As of the 2023–24 school year, the school had an enrollment of 255 students (plus 17 in PreK) and 32.3 classroom teachers (on an FTE basis), for a student–teacher ratio of 7.9:1. The school's student body was 34.5% (88) White, 23.9% (61) Black, 16.9% (43) two or more races, 14.9% (38) Hispanic and 9.8% (25) Asian.

The school was founded in 1920, and named for Pere Henri Lacordaire, a Dominican priest who lived in post-revolution Paris.

== Activities ==
Lacordaire Academy provides many clubs and organizations that students can join based on their own interests and availability. At Lacordaire, a student can create any club that she desires as long as they find a moderator and people to join.

=== Leadership ===
- Dominican Preachers
- National Honor Society
- Student Ambassadors
- Student Council

=== Athletics ===
The Lacordaire Lions compete in interscholastic sports under the supervision of the New Jersey State Interscholastic Athletic Association competing on an independent basis.

Sports offered include:

- Tennis
- Volleyball
- Soccer
- Basketball
- Softball

A runner from the school was the Non-Public B individual champion in 2002.

=== Literary ===
- The Checkerboard (Newspaper)
- Veritas (Yearbook)
- Zephyr (Literary Magazine)
- Laco Ledger (Middle School)

=== Clubs ===
- Culture Club
- Mission Club
- Environmental Club
- Mock Trial
- Forensics
- Lego Club
- Preachers Club
- Peer Tutoring
- Checkerboard Club
- Choir and Instrumental Club
- Science Mentors
- Poetry Out Loud
- Sports Club
- Yearbook Club
- Medical Sciences Club
- Cooking Club
- Book Club
- Laco Voices

== Graduation requirements ==
All Upper School students follow a college preparatory program. All requirements must be fulfilled or substituted with a course of equal value.
Required:

- 6 full-year electives
- 4 years Religious Studies
- 4 years English
- 4 years Comprehensive Health/Physical Education
- 3 years Mathematics
- 3 years Foreign Language
- 4 years Science
- 2 years United States History
- 1 year World History
- 1 year Fine Arts
- 1 year Computer Science
- 1 semester Project Justice Internship

== Notable alumni ==
- Elizabeth McAlister (born 1939), peace activist and former nun of the Religious of the Sacred Heart of Mary.
