= J. Clydesdale Cushman =

American businessman (1887–1955)

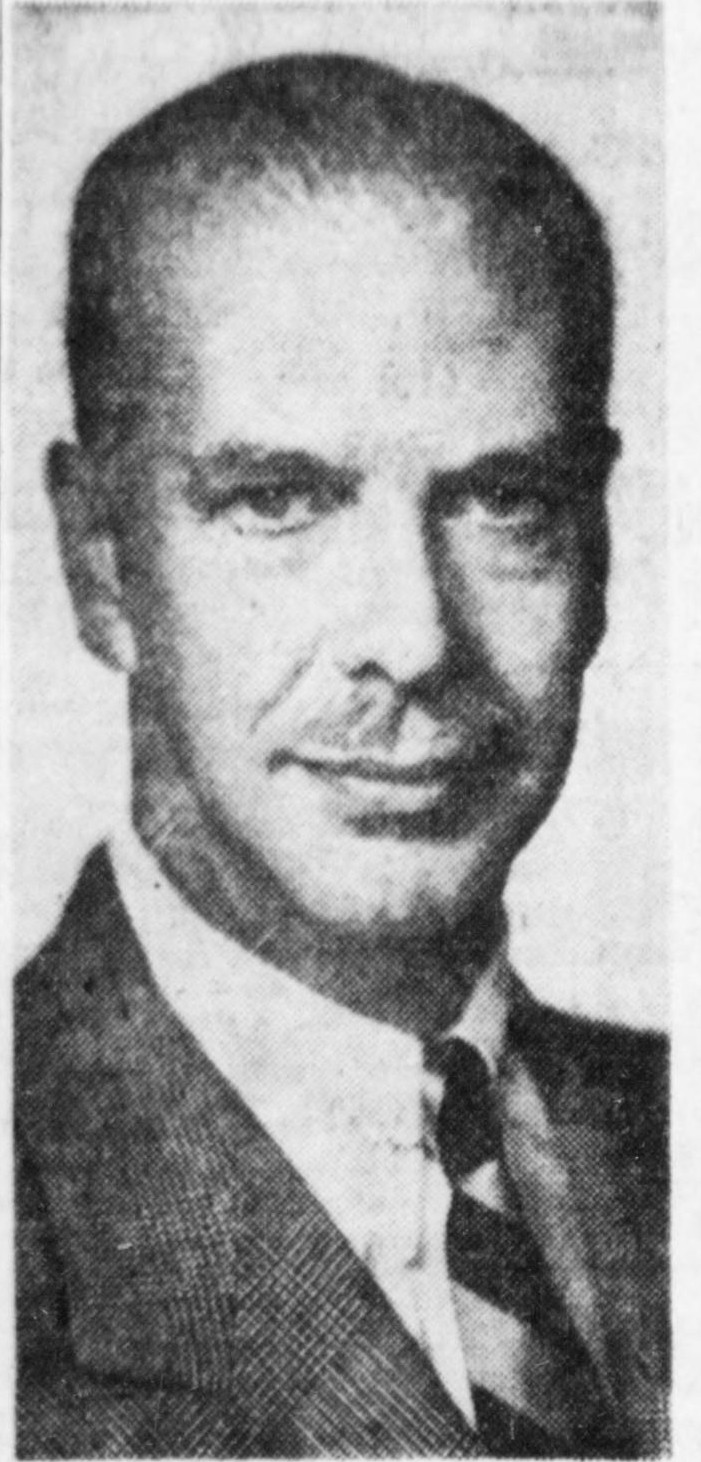
Cushman c. 1948

John Clydesdale Cushman (1887 – June 29, 1955) was an American businessman who co-founded the real estate firm Cushman & Wakefield in 1917 with Bernard Wakefield, who later became his brother-in-law.

Born in Summit, New Jersey, Cushman attended Phillips Exeter Academy. He died on June 29, 1955, at his home in Upper Montclair, New Jersey. His great-grandfather was New York real estate executive Don Alonzo Cushman.
