= Max Kolomatsky =

American street artist

- Other names: Max Kolo, Cool lookin bug
- Occupations: Street artist; filmmaker
- Website: www.maxkolo.com

Max Kolomatsky, also known as Max Kolo and Cool lookin bug, is a Brooklyn-based freelance digital street artist and filmmaker. He is best known for anonymously redesigning flyers around New York City.

== Biography ==
Kolomatsky is from Montclair, New Jersey. In 2023, Kolomatsky redesigned a flier asking people to join a group for people that played Catan that he felt was "cluttered and text-heavy". After this, Kolomatsky noticed that many fliers in New York City were "not achieving their full potential", specifically fliers for small businesses. He noted that "Good design really can benefit a small business".

Kolomatsky takes a photograph of the flier, redesigns it digitally on his iPad and then tapes it beside the original flier. Kolomatsky uploads videos of his artistic process to TikTok and Instagram, where several of them went viral, gaining the attention of Adobe, who partnered with Kolomatsky to make a series of viral illustration videos for their TikTok account. Kolomatsky has also illustrated for the New York Times, animated commercials for Vans, and directed a music video for Sony. Kolomatsky also went viral in 2025 after posting a video to TikTok about designing a game out of his chore chart due to his roommate forgetting to clean their dishes.
