= Margaret E. Grigsby =

African American physician

Margaret Elizabeth Grigsby
- Born: January 16, 1923; Prairie View, Texas
- Died: June 24, 2009 (aged 86); Washington, D.C.
- Education: Bachelor's Degree from Prairie View College (1943) and M.D. from The University of Michigan (1947)
- Known for: Physician of Internal Medicine, Tropical Medicine, and Infectious Disease
- Parent(s): John Richard Grigsby and Lee (Hankins) Grigsby

Margaret Elizabeth Grigsby (January 16, 1923 - June 24, 2009) was an American physician, noteworthy as the first African-American woman to become a fellow of the American College of Physicians and the first woman to preside over a major medical division at Howard University Hospital. Grigsby was best known as an Internal Medicine physician, with a speciality in Tropical Medicine and infectious diseases, practicing both in the United States and Africa. She died on June 24, 2009, at the age of 86, at Howard University Hospital, Washington, D.C.

== Education ==
Grigsby was born in Prairie View, Texas to John Richard and Lee (Hankins) Grigsby.

Grigsby earned her baccalaureate at Prairie View College in 1943. After earning her baccalaureate, she attended the University of Michigan to receive her medical degree. After obtaining her M.D., she toured the countries that were part of the Soviet Union in 1960 and presented papers in Moscow, Warsaw, and Prague. While Grigsby was abroad she continued her work as a professor of medicine at the University of Ibadan in Nigeria. In 1963 Grisby received a Diploma in Tropical Medicine & Hygiene from the London School of Hygiene and Tropical Medicine. Soon after, she received an award in 1967 as a distinguished professor of medicine in West Africa. Her contributions to smallpox medicine in Africa was ultimately honored with the Presidential Citation in 1972.

== Career ==
Starting in 1948, Grigsby interned at Homer G. Phillips Hospital in St. Louis until 1949. In 1949, she was promoted to an assistant resident of medicine, a position which she held until 1950. In 1950, Grigsby had the opportunity to be an assistant resident at Freedmen's Hospital in Washington. Thus, she transferred hospitals and worked in this position, until 1951 when Freedman's Hospital promoted her to an assistant physician. In 1956, Grigsby became an attending physician at Freedmen's Hospital and during this time she specialized in internal medicine from 1953 to 1954. In 1957, she accepted a job at Howard University where she was an instructor of medicine. She taught as an instructor until 1957, and then she was promoted as an assistant professor at Howard. She worked as an assistant professor until 1960 when she became an associate professor. Grigsby worked as an associate professor until 1966 when she became a full-time professor.

She held other positions. At Howard University, she worked as the chief of infectious diseases from 1952 to 1971, and an administrative assistant for the department of medicine school social work from 1961 to 1963. In addition to her positions at Howard, Grigsby held a couple positions in Ibadan, Nigeria. She had a position in the Epidemiologist United States Public Health Service from 1966 to 1968, and served as an honorary visiting professor for preventive and social medicine from 1967 to 1968.

During Grigsby's two years in Africa, she oversaw the smallpox inoculation of millions of individuals. Grigsby was able to do this through the Smallpox Eradication Program from Howard University College of Medicine. After returning from Africa she continued her profession as a professor at Howard University until she retired in 1993.

== Degrees and awards ==
- National Board Medical Examiners, American Board Internal Medicine. Rockefeller Foundation fellow Harvard University, 1951-1952
- Research fellow Thorndike Memorial Laboratory, Boston City Hospital, 1951-1952
- China Medical Board fellow tropical medicine University Puerto Rico, 1956
- Commonwealth Fund Fellow University London, 1962-1963
- Surgeon General's Certificate of Appreciation, 1987
- Leonard F. Sain Esteemed Alumni Award, 1987

== Selected Publications ==
- Grigsby, M. E. (1978). Tropical Diseases—A Handbook for Practitioners [Review of Tropical Diseases—A Handbook for Practitioners]. Journal of the National Medical Association, 70(8), 560–561. https://i-share-iit.primo.exlibrisgroup.com/permalink/01CARLI_IIT/8ucv33/cdi_pubmedcentral_primary_oai_pubmedcentral_nih_gov_2537217
- Grigsby, M. E. (1951). Medical aspects of atomic energy. Journal of the National Medical Association, 43(2), 73–79. https://i-share-iit.primo.exlibrisgroup.com/permalink/01CARLI_IIT/8ucv33/cdi_pubmedcentral_primary_oai_pubmedcentral_nih_gov_2616586
- Grigsby, M. E., & FUERTES, M. J. (1962). The prevention and control of hospital infections. Journal of the National Medical Association, 54(4), 480–482. https://i-share-iit.primo.exlibrisgroup.com/permalink/01CARLI_IIT/8ucv33/cdi_pubmedcentral_primary_oai_pubmedcentral_nih_gov_2642327
