= Roger Sedarat =

American poet

Roger Sedarat is an Iranian-American poet, scholar, and literary translator.

== Creative Work/Publications ==
He is the author of four poetry collections: Dear Regime: Letters to the Islamic Republic, which won Ohio UP's 2007 Hollis Summers' Prize, Ghazal Games (Ohio University Press, 2011), Foot Faults: Tennis Poems (David Roberts Books, 2016), and Haji as Puppet: an Orientalist Burlesque, which won the Tenth Gate Prize for a Mid-Career Poet (Word Works, 2017). In his poetry, he frequently crosses the post-modern American tradition with the classical Persian tradition, reproducing his hybrid identity in his verse. His poetry and literary translations have appeared in such journals as Poetry, New England Review, and Michigan Quarterly Review. He has also published the chapbooks: Eco-Logic of the Word Lamb/Translations & Imitations (Ghost Bird Press, 2016) and From Tehran to Texas (Cervena Barva, 2007). Co-author and co-translator of "Nature and Nostalgia in the Poetry of Nader Naderpour (Cambria, 2017), he received the 2015 Willis Barnstone Prize Award in Translation. Under the name of "Haji," he writes poetry and stages dramatic performances that both challenge oppressive regimes, the construct of "Poetry," and the western gaze of the Middle East in the 21st century.

== Academic Publications ==
Trained as an Americanist, his early study of American poetry, New England Landscape History in America Poetry: a Lacanian View (Cambria, 2011), relates the verse of Emily Dickinson, Robert Frost, Wallace Stevens, and Robert Lowell to the figuration of landscape history through psychoanalytic theory. His most recent academic book, Emerson in Iran: the American Appropriation of Persian Poetry (SUNY Press, 2019) is the first full-length study of Persian Influence in the work of the seminal American poet, philosopher, and translator, Ralph Waldo Emerson. Extending the current trend in transnational studies back to the figural origins of both the United States and Iran, Sedarat's comparative readings of Platonism and Sufi mysticism reveal how Emerson managed to reconcile through verse two countries so seemingly different in religion and philosophy. By tracking various rhetorical strategies through a close interrogation of Emerson's own writings on language and literary appropriation, he exposes the development of a latent but considerable translation theory in the American literary tradition, further showing how generative Persian poetry becomes during Emerson's nineteenth century, and how such formative effects continue to influence contemporary American poetry and verse translation. A book chapter, "Middle Eastern-American Literature: A Contemporary Turn in Emerson Studies," appearing in A Power to Translate the World: New Essays on Emerson and International Culture, examines Ralph Waldo Emerson's influence upon such Arab-American writers as Ameen Rihani.

== Personal Background ==
He was born in Normal, Illinois, to an Iranian father and American mother, and grew up in San Antonio, Texas. After attending the University of Texas at Austin, he completed an MA in English/Creative Writing at Queens College, City University of New York, and a PhD in English at Tufts University He currently teaches poetry and literary translation in the MFA Program in Creative Writing and Literary Translation as well as courses in literary theory, American and Middle-Eastern American literature, and poetics in the English Department at Queens College, City University of New York.
