= Guy T. Viskniskki =

Guy Thomas Viskniskki (April 28, 1876 – September 5, 1949) was a career newspaper editor and news executive who founded the historic World War I edition of The Stars and Stripes newspaper while serving as a U.S. Army officer in France with the American Expeditionary Force. Viskniskki established the tradition of The Stars and Stripes as an independent American newspaper for military personnel serving overseas, a tradition that continues to the present day.

Viskniskki was born in Carmi, Illinois, in 1876. He worked at several newspapers in his early career. During the Spanish American War he enlisted in the U.S. Army in 1899 and served as noncommissioned officer in Puerto Rico, then returned to civilian newspaper work following his discharge.

With the outbreak of World War I, Viskniskki rejoined the U.S. Army and, as a second lieutenant and morale officer, established a successful financially independent military newspaper at Camp Lee, Virginia in 1917. Transferred overseas, he persuaded the headquarters of General John J. Pershing to authorize the establishment of a weekly newspaper by and for American troops to contribute to morale. Printed in Paris and sold to frontline soldiers, the newspaper printed 30,000 copies for its first edition and was printing 500,000 copies per week by the time it disbanded in June 1919, shortly before the signing of the Treaty of Versailles that ended World War I.

Returning again to civilian life after World War I, Viskniskki spent the remainder of his career working as an editor, managing editor, and trouble-shooter for newspapers and news syndicates across the country, specializing in restoring profitability to troubled news organizations, especially during and after the Great Depression. A 1946 Time magazine article referred to him a "celebrated ... newspaper doctor" and a "tough, ruthless" efficiency expert.

A longtime resident of Montclair, New Jersey, he died at his home there in 1949 at the age of 73.
