= Bernard Wakefield =

British-American businessman (c. 1883–1967)

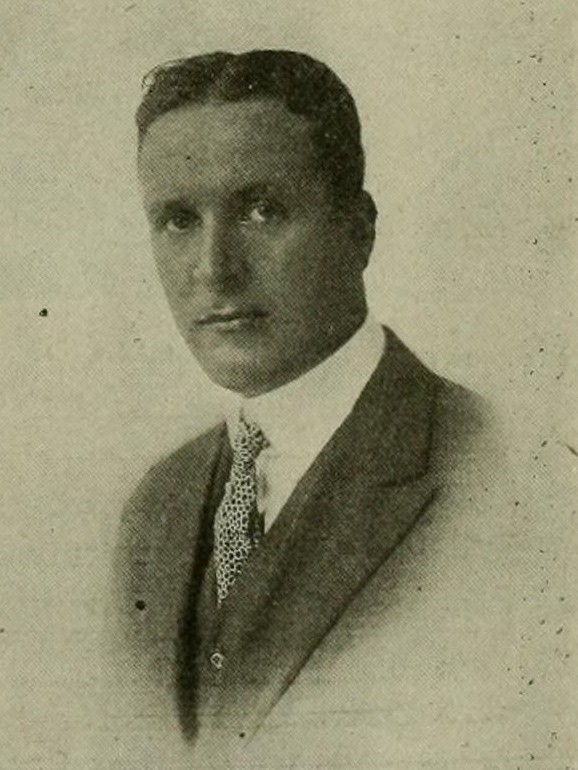
Wakefield c. 1919

Bernard Wakefield (c. 1883 – September 29, 1967) was a British-American executive who co-founded the real estate firm Cushman & Wakefield in 1917 alongside J. Clydesdale Cushman, who later became his brother-in-law. Born in Northamptonshire, England, he moved to the United States in 1910 and died at his home in Upper Montclair, New Jersey, at the age of 84.
