= Cushman & Wakefield =

Global commercial real estate services firm

Cushman & Wakefield Inc.
- Type: Public
- Traded as: NYSE: CWK; S&P 600 component; Russell 2000 component
- ISIN: GB00BFZ4N465
- Industry: Real estate
- Founded: 1917; 109 years ago
- Headquarters: Chicago, Illinois, U.S.
- Area served: Worldwide
- Key people: Steve Plavin (chairman); Michelle MacKay (CEO); Andrew McDonald (global president & COO)
- Products: Commercial real estate services
- Services: Agency Leasing; Asset Services; Capital Markets; Facility Services; Occupier Integrated Services; Investment Management (DTZ Investors); Project & Development Services; Tenant Representation; Valuation & Advisory
- Revenue: ▲US$10.3 billion (2025)
- Operating income: ▲US$452.5 million (2025)
- Net income: ▼US$88.2 million (2025)
- Total assets: ▲US$7.68 billion (2025)
- Total equity: ▲US$1.96 billion (2025)
- Number of employees: c. 53,000 (2026)
- Website: cushmanwakefield.com

Cushman & Wakefield is a global commercial real estate services firm headquartered in Chicago, Illinois. The company provides services to occupiers and investors and, as of 2025, had approximately 53,000 employees across more than 350 offices in nearly 60 countries. In 2025, Cushman & Wakefield reported revenue of $10.3 billion, with operations across services, leasing, capital markets, and valuation and other advisory services.

== History ==
Cushman & Wakefield was founded in New York City on October 31, 1917, by brothers-in-law J. Clydesdale Cushman and Bernard Wakefield.

In 1946, Cushman & Wakefield participates in the land assemblage for what became the United Nations headquarters complex on First Avenue in Manhattan.

In the 1960s, Cushman & Wakefield begins a national expansion, establishing offices throughout the U.S.

In 1969, media conglomerate RCA Corp acquires Cushman & Wakefield.

In 1976, RCA Corp sells its stake to The Rockefeller Group.

In 1987, Listed on London Stock Exchange as Debenham, Tewson & Chinnocks (DTZ)

In 1989, Mitsubishi Estate Co. Ltd., one of the world’s largest real estate companies, becomes The Rockefeller Group’s majority shareholder.

In 1990, a presence in Europe is established through the acquisition of Healey & Baker. George Healey founded the firm in 1910, taking building leases near Regent's Park during the construction of Regent Street. He was joined by partner George Henry Baker, who joined the firm in 1910, and whose name was added to the firm's in 1920. Baker initiated the firm's focus on commercial property.

In 1993, European joint ventures with Jean Thouard of France and the Zadelhoff Group in Germany and the Netherlands, creates the DTZ brand.

In 1994, Cushman & Wakefield establishes worldwide partnerships with major real estate firms in the Americas, Europe, Asia.

In 1999, DTZ extends into Asia with partners CY Leung & Co in China and Edmund Tie & Co in Singapore.

In 2001, Cushman & Wakefield acquires Cushman Realty Corporation (CRC), bolstering its presence on the West Coast and Southwest United States, bringing CRC founders John C. Cushman III and Louis B. Cushman back to the firm founded by their grandfather, J. Clydesdale Cushman and great-uncle, Bernard Wakefield.

In 2002, the Cushman & Wakefield Alliance Program is formed to expand service capabilities for clients in U.S. markets where owned offices were not maintained.

In 2005, Cushman & Wakefield expands internationally through acquisitions that included Russia's Stiles & Riabokobylko, Canada's Royal LePage Commercial, and Semco Johnson Controls.

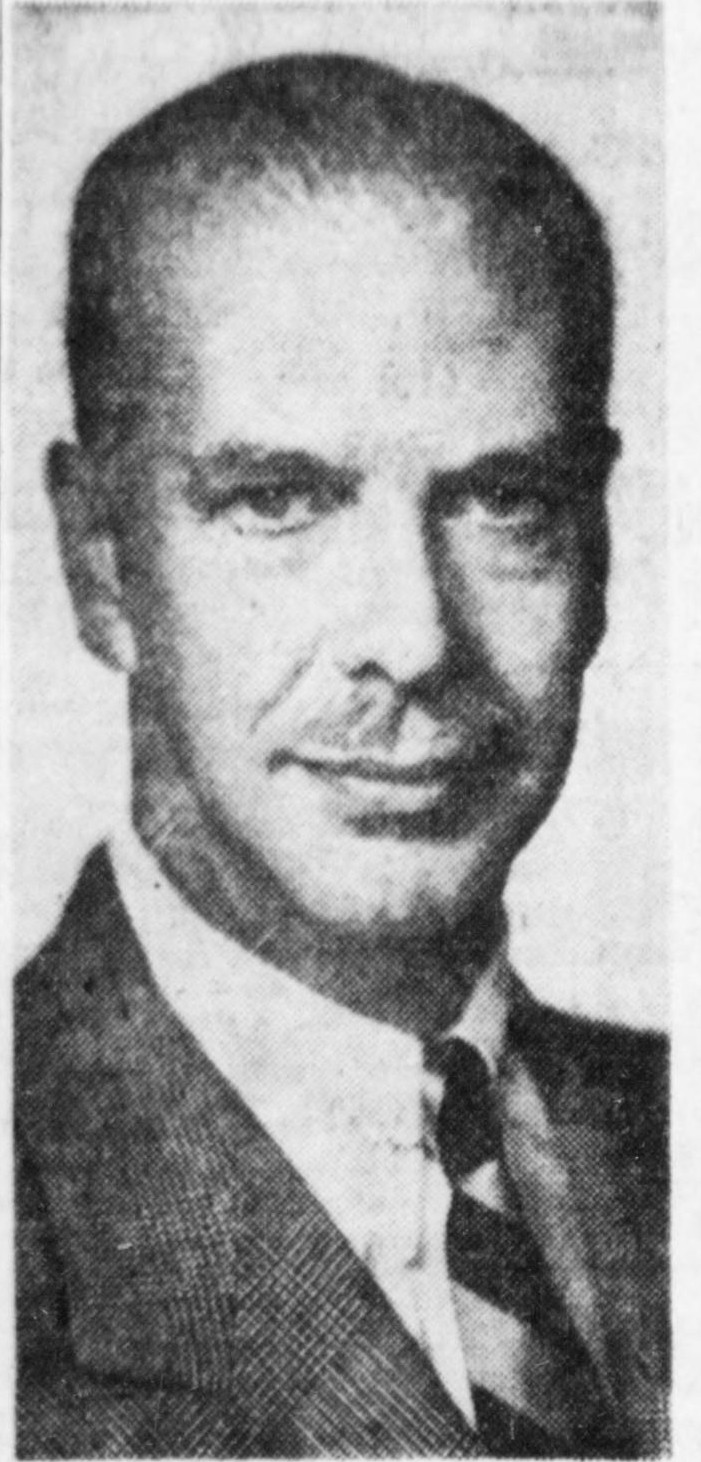
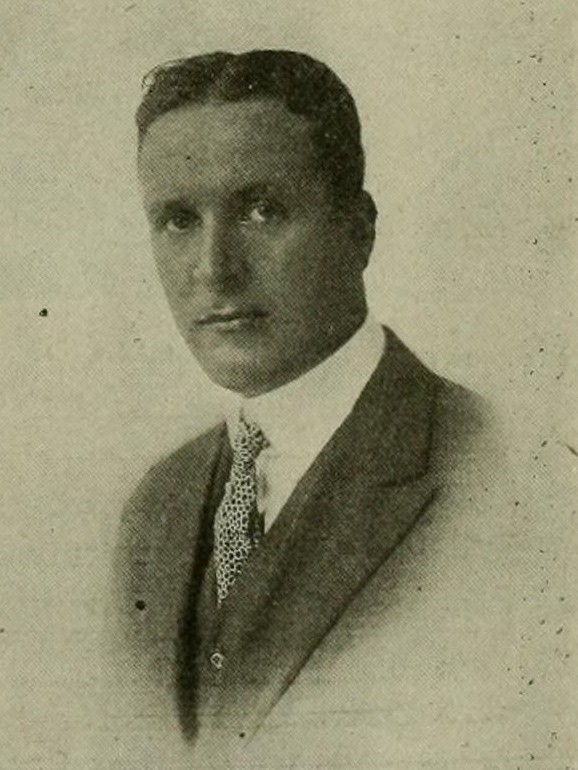
Cushman (left) and Wakefield, founders of Cushman & Wakefield

In 2007, IFIL (now known as EXOR), the investment group of the Agnelli family, acquired an approximately 70 percent stake in Cushman & Wakefield becoming the firm's majority shareholders and replacing the Rockefeller Group as majority shareholder of the firm. That same year, Cushman & Wakefield carried out a series of acquisitions which include real estate investment banking firm Sonnenblick Goldman, Semco, Alston Nock.

In December 2011, Australian engineering and services company UGL acquires the trading operations of DTZ Holdings for £77.5 million and integrated DTZ with its existing property services business. The combined property services operations were subsequently consolidated under the DTZ brand.

In November 2014, UGL sells DTZ to a private equity consortium comprising TPG Capital, PAG Asia Capital and Ontario Teachers’ Pension Plan.

On February 24, 2015, it was confirmed that Exor SpA had approved management's hiring of Goldman Sachs Group Inc. and Morgan Stanley to help look for a buyer for Cushman.

On May 11, 2015, DTZ, a commercial-real-estate-services firm backed by private-equity giant TPG, PAG Asia Capital, and Ontario Teachers' Pension Plan (OTTP), agreed to buy Cushman & Wakefield Inc. for $2 billion.

On September 1, 2015, Cushman & Wakefield and DTZ merged. The firm now operates under the Cushman & Wakefield brand. The new Cushman & Wakefield is majority owned by an investor group led by TPG, PAG, and OTPP. The two companies combined for $6 billion in revenues and 45,000 employees. In 2016, the two engaged in more than $191 billion in commercial real estate transactions and approximately 4.3 billion square feet under management.

In September 2016, Cushman & Wakefield sold its Business Integration Group, Inc., subsidirary to Accruent, LLC, of Austin, Texas. Business Integration Group was a provider of integrated workplace management system software and professional services based in Tempe, Arizona.

In October 2017, Chaney Brooks became an alliance partner with Cushman & Wakefield establishing a foothold in the Hawaii & Guam markets by partnering with one of the oldest commercial real estate firms in the islands.

In March 2018, Cushman & Wakefield had debts amounting to $3.1 billion, an increase of $300 million compared with the end of 2017. The company had a debt-annual revenue ratio of 44%, which was higher than that of its competitors CBRE Group, JLL and Zillow.

In June 2018, Cushman & Wakefield filed an S-1 form with the Securities & Exchange Commission announcing its intent to be listed on the NYSE. It became listed on the New York Stock Exchange on August 2, 2018.

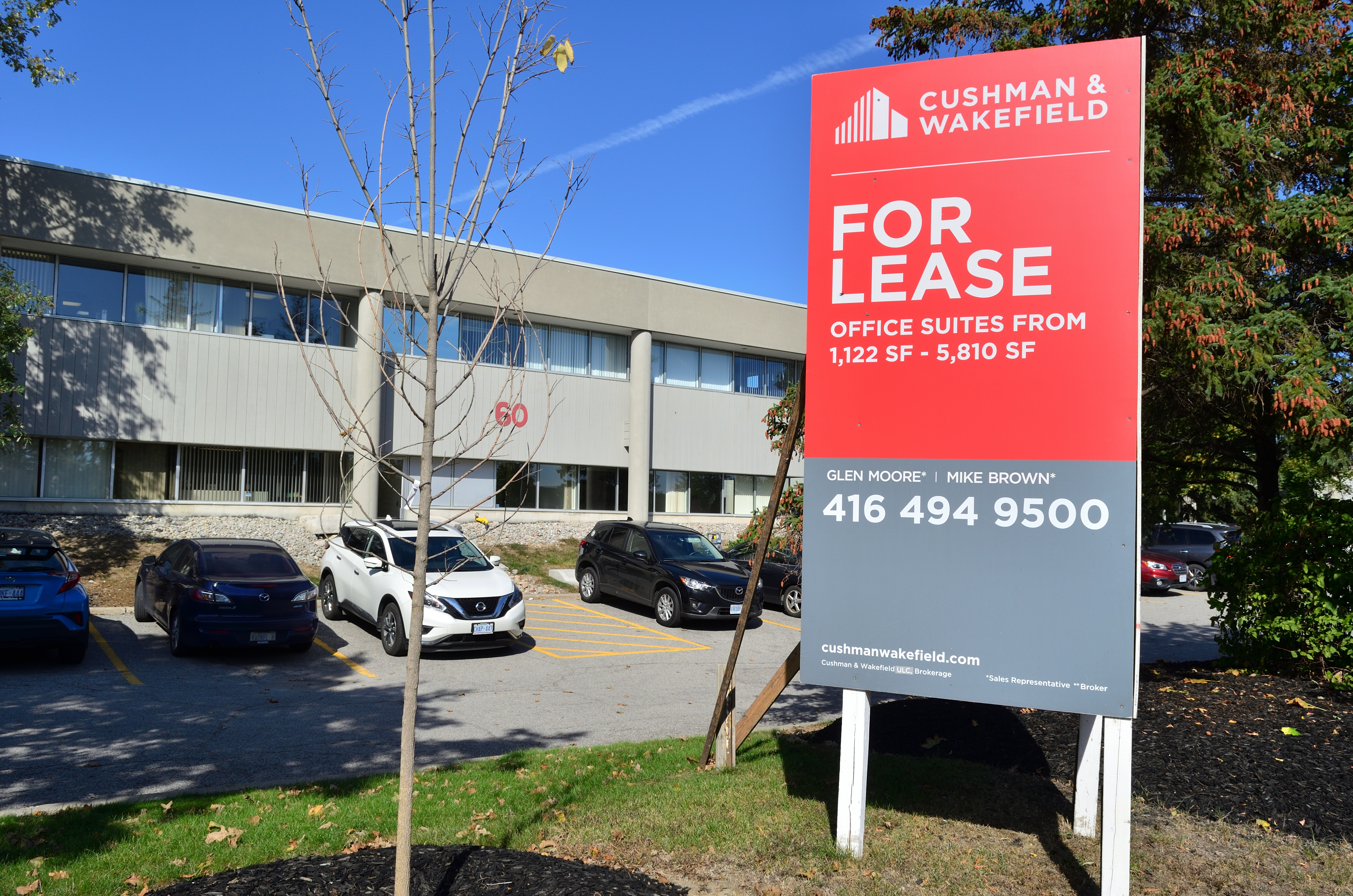
Cushman & Wakefield for lease sign in Canada

On November 9, 2020, Cushman & Wakefield purchased significantly all of the holdings of Triad Commercial Properties. Tom Townes will be the managing director and Hap Royster will be the vice chairman of Cushman & Wakefield. On November 13, 2020, Cushman & Wakefield confirmed the hiring of Chris Cuff as Regional Executive Director of Commercial Leasing based in Singapore.

== See also ==
- CBRE Group
- JLL (company)
- Newmark Group
- Colliers International
- Marcus & Millichap
