= Pearl Grigsby Richardson =

American educator

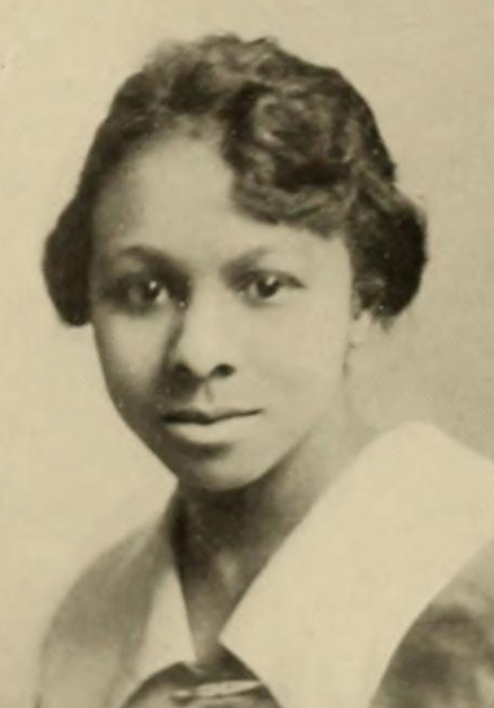
- Pearl Grigsby Richardson, from the 1919 yearbook of Smith College
- Born: March 28, 1896; Montclair, New Jersey, U.S.
- Died: October 13, 1983 (aged 87); New Jersey, U.S.
- Occupations: Educator, clubwoman

Pearl Aurelia Grigsby Richardson (March 28, 1896 – October 13, 1983) was an American educator and clubwoman. She ran a well-regarded childcare program in Montclair, New Jersey, from the 1930s to the 1960s.

== Early life and education ==
Pearl Grigsby was born in Montclair, New Jersey, the eldest of five children of William Grigsby and Golden Belle Anderson Grigsby. She graduated from Smith College in 1919. She pursued further studies in child development at Rutgers University.

== Career ==
After she married, Richardson taught in Georgia, at Dorchester Academy, a missionary school, and at Haines Normal Institute. She was a member of the Alpha Kappa Alpha (AKA) sorority, and of the Townswomen, an organization of twelve prominent Black women in Montclair. In 1921, she was one of the five founding members of the Delta Omega graduate chapter of AKA, in Petersburg, Virginia, along with Pauline Sims Puryear and Louise Stokes Hunter. She was one of the six founding members of the first chapter of AKA in Louisiana, when she helped to found the Alpha Beta Omega graduate chapter in New Orleans in 1927.

She lived in Saint Thomas in the Virgin Islands, where her husband was the appointed postmaster from 1932 to 1936. While there, she taught at Charlotte Amalie High School. Back in New Jersey, she was founder and director of Montclair's Child Care Center, from the late 1930s until she retired in 1965. "I knew it was needed here, so I just did it," she recalled in 1965.

== Personal life ==
Pearl Grigsby married fellow educator Edward S. Richardson Jr. in 1922. They had a son, Edward William. Her husband died in 1976, and she died in 1983, at the age of 87, in New Jersey.
