= List of African-American statewide elected officials =

States where African-Americans have served as statewide executive officials: Reconstruction Era African-American statewide officeholders (all Republican) 1868–1887 States which have only elected/appointed African-American Democrats as statewide officeholders (1963–present) States which have only elected/appointed African-American Republicans as statewide officeholders (1963–present) States which have elected/appointed African-Americans from both parties (1963–present)

This is a list of African Americans who have served in statewide elected executive offices in the United States, whether they were elected, succeeded or appointed to such elected office. These state constitutional officers have their duties and qualifications mandated in state constitutions. This list includes those directly elected to state constitutional boards and commissions, whether statewide or by district. This list does not include those elected to serve in non-executive branches of government, such as justices of the state supreme courts or at-large members of the state legislatures. This list also excludes federal legislators, such as the two members of the United States Senate elected from each state or at-large members of the United States House of Representatives.

== Summary ==
State	Number of statewide executive officials	U.S. Senators	U.S. at-large Representatives	Total	Notes
Arizona	1			1	
Arkansas	1			1	
California	5	2		6	Kamala Harris held office as Attorney General and later as U.S. Senator
Colorado	3			3	
Connecticut	5			5	
Delaware	2	1	1	3	Lisa Blunt Rochester has held office as U.S. Representative and U.S. Senator
Florida	4		1	5	Jonathan Clarkson Gibbs held office as Secretary of State and State Superintendent.
Georgia	3	1		4	
Illinois	4	3		6	Roland Burris held office as Comptroller, Attorney General and U.S. Senator
Indiana	4			4	
Kansas	1			1	
Kentucky	2			2	
Louisiana	5			5	
Maryland	4	1		5	
Massachusetts	3	2		4	Edward Brooke held office as Attorney General and U.S. Senator
Michigan	3			3	
Minnesota	1			1	
Mississippi	7	2		9	As of 2025, all of Mississippi's African-American statewide officials and Senators took office during Reconstruction.
Nevada	1			1	
New Jersey	8	1		9	
New Mexico	1			1	
New York	9			9	
North Carolina	4			4	
Ohio	3			3	
Oklahoma	1			1	
Oregon	1			1	
Pennsylvania	1			1	
South Carolina	5	1	1	6	Francis Lewis Cardozo held office as Secretary of State and State Treasurer.
Texas	2			2	
Vermont	1			1	
Virginia	3			3	
Wisconsin	3			3	

== Governors ==
Denotes incumbent governor
- Italics denotes acting governor

Portrait	Name	Party	State	Term start	Term end	Notes
	Oscar Dunn (1826–1871)	Republican	Louisiana	June 27, 1868	November 22, 1871	Elevated from lieutenant governor. Died in office.
	P. B. S. Pinchback (1837–1921)	Republican	Louisiana	December 9, 1872	January 13, 1873	Elevated from lieutenant governor. Term ended.
	Douglas Wilder (born 1931)	Democratic	Virginia	January 13, 1990	January 15, 1994	Term-limited.
	Deval Patrick (born 1956)	Democratic	Massachusetts	January 4, 2007	January 8, 2015	Retired
	David Paterson (born 1954)	Democratic	New York	March 17, 2008	December 31, 2010	Elevated to office from lieutenant governor. Retired.
	Wes Moore (born 1978)	Democratic	Maryland	January 18, 2023	present	

=== Territorial governors ===
Denotes incumbent governor
- Italics denotes acting governor

Portrait	Name	Party	Territory	Term start	Term end	Notes
	Walter Washington (1915–2003)	Democratic	District of Columbia	November 7, 1967	January 2, 1979	Appointed as Mayor-Commissioner before being elected in his own right Lost renomination
	Melvin H. Evans (1917–1984)	Republican	United States Virgin Islands	July 1, 1969	January 6, 1975	Appointed as civilian governor before being elected in his own right Lost election
	Marion Barry (1936–2014)	Democratic	District of Columbia	January 2, 1979	January 2, 1991	Retired
	Marion Barry (1936–2014)	Democratic	District of Columbia	January 2, 1995	January 2, 1999	Retired
	Sharon Pratt (born 1944)	Democratic	District of Columbia	January 2, 1991	January 2, 1995	Lost renomination
	Anthony A. Williams (born 1951)	Democratic	District of Columbia	January 2, 1999	January 2, 2007	Retired
	Adrian Fenty (born 1970)	Democratic	District of Columbia	January 2, 2007	January 2, 2011	Lost renomination
	Vincent C. Gray (born 1942)	Democratic	District of Columbia	January 2, 2011	January 2, 2015	Lost renomination
	Muriel Bowser (born 1972)	Democratic	District of Columbia	January 2, 2015	present	

== Lieutenant governors ==
Denotes incumbent lieutenant governor
- Italics denotes acting lieutenant governor

Portrait	Name	Party	State	Term start	Term end	Notes
	Oscar Dunn (1826–1871)	Republican	Louisiana	June 27, 1868	November 22, 1871	Died
	Alonzo J. Ransier (1834–1882)	Republican	South Carolina	December 3, 1870	December 7, 1872	Retired to run successfully for South Carolina's 2nd congressional district
	Alexander K. Davis (died 1884)	Republican	Mississippi	November 30, 1871	March 29, 1876	Retired
	P. B. S. Pinchback (1837–1921)	Republican	Louisiana	December 6, 1871	December 9, 1872	Elevated to governor
	Richard Howell Gleaves (1819–1907)	Republican	South Carolina	December 7, 1872	December 14, 1876	Lost reelection
	Caesar Antoine (1836–1921)	Republican	Louisiana	May 22, 1873	April 24, 1877	Lost reelection
	Mervyn Dymally (1926–2012)	Democratic	California	January 6, 1975	January 8, 1979	Lost reelection
	George L. Brown (1926–2006)	Democratic	Colorado	January 14, 1975	January 10, 1979	Retired
	Douglas Wilder (born 1931)	Democratic	Virginia	January 18, 1986	January 12, 1990	Retired to run successfully for governor
	Joe Rogers (1964–2013)	Republican	Colorado	January 12, 1999	January 14, 2003	Retired
	Jennette Bradley (born 1952)	Republican	Ohio	January 13, 2003	January 5, 2005	Resigned to become Ohio Treasurer
	Michael Steele (born 1958)	Republican	Maryland	January 15, 2003	January 17, 2007	Retired to run unsuccessfully for U.S. Senator of Maryland
	David Paterson (born 1954)	Democratic	New York	January 1, 2007	March 17, 2008	Elevated to governor
	Anthony Brown (born 1961)	Democratic	Maryland	January 17, 2007	January 21, 2015	Retired to run unsuccessfully for governor
	Malcolm Smith (born 1956)	Democratic	New York	January 7, 2009	June 8, 2009	Resigned
	Jennifer Carroll (born 1959)	Republican	Florida	January 4, 2011	March 12, 2013	Resigned
	Boyd Rutherford (born 1957)	Republican	Maryland	January 21, 2015	January 18, 2023	Retired
	Jenean Hampton (born 1958)	Republican	Kentucky	December 8, 2015	December 9, 2019	Retired
	Justin Fairfax (1979–2026)	Democratic	Virginia	January 13, 2018	January 15, 2022	Retired to run unsuccessfully for the Democratic nomination for governor
	Sheila Oliver (1952–2023)	Democratic	New Jersey	January 16, 2018	August 1, 2023	Died
	Garlin Gilchrist (born 1982)	Democratic	Michigan	January 1, 2019	present	
	Mandela Barnes (born 1986)	Democratic	Wisconsin	January 7, 2019	January 3, 2023	Retired to run unsuccessfully for U.S. senator
	Juliana Stratton (born 1965)	Democratic	Illinois	January 14, 2019	present	
	Mark Robinson (born 1968)	Republican	North Carolina	January 9, 2021	January 1, 2025	Retired to run unsuccessfully for governor
	Andrea Stewart-Cousins (born 1950)	Democratic	New York	August 24, 2021	September 9, 2021	New Lieutenant Governor appointed
	Andrea Stewart-Cousins (born 1950)	Democratic	New York	April 12, 2022	May 25, 2022	New Lieutenant Governor appointed
	Brian Benjamin (born 1976)	Democratic	New York	September 9, 2021	April 12, 2022	Resigned
	Winsome Sears (born 1964)	Republican	Virginia	January 15, 2022	January 17, 2026	Retired to run unsuccessfully for governor
	Antonio Delgado (born 1977)	Democratic	New York	May 25, 2022	present	
	Austin Davis (born 1989)	Democratic	Pennsylvania	January 17, 2023	present	
	Tahesha Way (born 1971)	Democratic	New Jersey	September 8, 2023	January 20, 2026	New Lieutenant Governor appointed
	Dale Caldwell (born 1960)	Democratic	New Jersey	January 20, 2026	September 25, 2026	Resigned

== Attorneys general ==
Denotes incumbent attorney general
- Italics denotes acting attorney general

Picture	Name	Party	State	Term start	Term end	Notes	Ref
	Edward Brooke (1919–2015)	Republican	Massachusetts	January 3, 1963	January 3, 1967	Retired to run successfully for U.S. Senate from Massachusetts	
	Roland Burris (born 1937)	Democratic	Illinois	January 14, 1991	January 9, 1995	Retired to run unsuccessfully for Governor of Illinois	
	Pamela Carter (born 1949)	Democratic	Indiana	January 13, 1993	January 16, 1997	Retired	
	Thurbert Baker (born 1952)	Democratic	Georgia	June 1, 1997	January 10, 2011	Retired to run unsuccessfully for Governor of Georgia	
	Karen Freeman-Wilson (born 1960)	Democratic	Indiana	June 8, 2000	January 14, 2001	Lost reelection	
	Peter C. Harvey (born 1952)	Democratic	New Jersey	June 16, 2003	January 30, 2006	Retired.	
	Kamala Harris (born 1964)	Democratic	California	January 3, 2011	January 3, 2017	Retired to run successfully for U.S. Senate from California	
	Curtis Hill (born 1960)	Republican	Indiana	January 9, 2017	January 11, 2021	Lost renomination	
	Letitia James (born 1958)	Democratic	New York	January 1, 2019	present		
	Kwame Raoul (born 1964)	Democratic	Illinois	January 14, 2019	present		
	Aaron D. Ford (born 1972)	Democratic	Nevada	January 7, 2019	present		
	Keith Ellison (born 1963)	Democratic	Minnesota	January 7, 2019	present		
	Daniel Cameron (born 1985)	Republican	Kentucky	December 17, 2019	December 17, 2023	Retired to run unsuccessfully for Governor of Kentucky	
	Anthony Brown (born 1961)	Democrat	Maryland	January 3, 2023	present		
	Andrea Campbell (born 1982)	Democrat	Massachusetts	January 18, 2023	present		
	Jay Jones (born 1989)	Democratic	Virginia	January 17, 2026	present		

=== Territorial attorneys general ===
Denotes incumbent attorney general
- Italics denotes acting attorney general

Picture	Name	Party	Territory	Term start	Term end	Notes	Ref
	Karl Racine (born 1963)	Democratic	District of Columbia	January 2, 2015	January 2, 2023		

== Secretaries of state ==
Denotes incumbent secretary of state
- Italics denotes acting secretary of state

Picture	Name	Party	State	Term start	Term end	Notes	Ref
	Jonathan Clarkson Gibbs (1821–1874)	Republican	Florida	1868	1872	Retired to run successfully for Superintendent of Public Instruction	
	Pierre G. Deslondes (born c. 1825)	Republican	Louisiana	1872	1876	Retired	
	James D. Lynch (1839–1872)	Republican	Mississippi	1869	1872	Retired	
	Hiram Rhodes Revels (1827–1901)	Republican	Mississippi	1872	1873	Retired	
	Hannibal C. Carter (1835–1904)	Republican	Mississippi	1873	1873	Retired	
	M. M. McLeod (c. 1847–1895)	Republican	Mississippi	1873	1873	Retired	
	James Hill (c. 1838–1903)	Republican	Mississippi	1874	1878	Retired	
	Francis Lewis Cardozo (1836–1903)	Republican	South Carolina	1868	1872	Retired to run successfully for State Treasurer	
	Henry Hayne (1840–???)	Republican	South Carolina	1872	1877	Resigned	
	Richard Austin (1913–2001)	Democratic	Michigan	January 1, 1971	January 1, 1995	Lost re-election	
	Basil Paterson (1926–2014)	Democratic	New York	January 1, 1979	January 1, 1983	Retired	
	Jesse McCrary (1937–2007)	Democratic	Florida	July 19, 1978	January 2, 1979	Retired	
	Vel Phillips (1923–2018)	Democratic	Wisconsin	January 3, 1979	January 3, 1983	Lost re-nomination	
	Myra McDaniel (1932–2010)	Democratic	Texas	August 6, 1984	January 26, 1987	Retired	
	Hannah Atkins (1923–2010)	Democratic	Oklahoma	1987	1991	Retired	
	Vikki Buckley (1948–1999)	Republican	Colorado	1994	1999	Died	
	Lonna Hooks	Republican	New Jersey	1994	1998	Retired	
	DeForest Soaries (born 1951)	Republican	New Jersey	January 1, 1999	January 1, 2002	Retired	
	Ken Blackwell (born 1948)	Republican	Ohio	January 8, 1999	January 8, 2007	Retired to run unsuccessfully for governor	
	Jesse White (born 1934)	Democratic	Illinois	January 11, 1999	January 9, 2023	Retired	
	Randy Daniels (born 1950)	Democratic	New York	2001	2005	Retired	
	Regena Thomas (born 1957)	Democratic	New Jersey	2002	2006	Retired	
	Nina Mitchell Wells (born 1950)	Democratic	New Jersey	January 19, 2006	January 19, 2010	Retired	
	Robyn Crittenden (born 1964)	Republican	Georgia	November 8, 2018	January 14, 2019	Retired	
	Tahesha Way (born 1971)	Democratic	New Jersey	September 8, 2023	January 20, 2026	New Secretary of State appointed	
	Dale Caldwell (born 1960)	Democratic	New Jersey	January 20, 2026	September 25, 2026	Resigned	
	Shirley Weber (born 1948)	Democratic	California	January 21, 2021	present		
	Stephanie Thomas (born 1969)	Democratic	Connecticut	January 4, 2023	present		
	Shirley Emehelu	Democratic	New Jersey	September 25, 2026	present	Appointed after Caldwell's resignation	

== Labor commissioners ==
Denotes incumbent labor commissioner
- Italics denotes acting labor commissioner

Picture	Name	Party	State	Term start	Term end	Notes	Ref
	Al Scott (born 1947)	Democratic	Georgia	1990	1992	Appointed by governor, lost special election primary	
	Mike Thurmond (born 1953)	Democratic	Georgia	January 11, 1999	January 10, 2011	Retired to run unsuccessfully for U.S. Senate	

== Auditors and comptrollers ==
Denotes incumbent auditor or comptroller
- Italics denotes acting auditor or comptroller

Picture	Name	Party	State	Term start	Term end	Notes
	Edward McCabe (1850–1920)	Republican	Kansas	January 8, 1883	January 10, 1887	Lost re-nomination
	Roland Burris (born 1937)	Democratic	Illinois	January 8, 1979	January 14, 1991	Retired to run successfully for Attorney General of Illinois
	H. Carl McCall (born 1935)	Democratic	New York	May 7, 1993	December 31, 2002	Retired to run unsuccessfully for Governor
	Ralph Campbell (1946–2011)	Democratic	North Carolina	January 3, 1993	January 4, 2005	Lost re-election
	Randy Brock (born 1943)	Republican	Vermont	January 3, 2005	January 4, 2007	Lost reelection
	Dwayne Sawyer (born 1966)	Republican	Indiana	August 19, 2013	December 15, 2013	Resigned
	Natalie Braswell	Democratic	Connecticut	December 31, 2021	January 4, 2023	Retired
	Timothy DeFoor (born 1961)	Republican	Pennsylvania	January 19, 2022	present	
	Brian J. Gaines (born 1981/82)	Democratic	South Carolina	May 12, 2023	present	

== Superintendents of education ==
Denotes incumbent superintendent
- Italics denotes acting superintendent

Picture	Name	Party	State	Term start	Term end	Notes	Ref
	William G. Brown (1832–1883)	Republican	Louisiana	1872	1876	Lost reelection	
	Thomas Cardozo (1838–1881)	Republican	Mississippi	1873	1875	Lost reelection	
	Joseph Corbin (1833–1911)	Republican	Arkansas	1873	1875	Lost reelection	
	Jonathan Clarkson Gibbs (1821–1874)	Republican	Florida	1872	1874	Died	
	Wilson Riles (1917–1999)	Democratic	California	1971	1983	Lost reelection	
	Doug Jamerson (1947–2001)	Democratic	Florida	1994	1995	Lost reelection	
	Patricia Willoughby	Democratic	North Carolina	September 1, 2004	August 23, 2005	Retired	
	Carolyn Stanford Taylor (born 1957)	Democratic	Wisconsin	January 7, 2019	July 5, 2021	Retired	
	Tony Thurmond (born 1968)	Democratic	California	January 7, 2019	present		
	Mo Green (born 1966/67)	Democratic	North Carolina	January 1, 2025	present		

== Treasurers ==
Denotes incumbent treasurer
- Italics denotes acting treasurer

Picture	Name	Party	State	Term start	Term end	Notes
	Antoine Dubuclet (1810–1887)	Republican	Louisiana	1868	1878	Retired
	Francis Lewis Cardozo (1836–1903)	Republican	South Carolina	August 1, 1872	May 1, 1877	Retired
	Gerald Lamb (1924–2014)	Democratic	Connecticut	1963	1970	Resigned
	Henry E. Parker (1928–2018)	Democratic	Connecticut	1974	1986	Resigned
	Loren E. Monroe (1932–2019)	Republican	Michigan	1978	1982	Retired
	James B. Lewis (born 1947)	Democratic	New Mexico	1985	1990	Retired
	James B. Lewis (born 1947)	Democratic	New Mexico	2007	2015	Retired
	Francisco Borges (born 1951)	Democratic	Connecticut	January 4, 1987	March 1, 1993	Resigned
	Jim Hill (born 1947)	Democratic	Oregon	January 1, 1993	January 1, 2001	Retired
	Joseph M. Suggs Jr. (born 1940)	Democratic	Connecticut	March 3, 1993	January 4, 1995	Lost election
	Richard Dixon (1938–2012)	Democratic	Maryland	1996	2002	Retired
	Denise Nappier (born 1951)	Democratic	Connecticut	January 3, 1999	January 9, 2019	Retired
	Jennette Bradley (born 1952)	Republican	Ohio	January 13, 2005	January 5, 2007	Lost renomination
	Michellene Davis (born 1971)	Democratic	New Jersey	September 2007	January 2008	Retired
	Velda Jones-Potter (born 1957/58)	Democratic	Delaware	January 1, 2009	January 1, 2011	Lost renomination
	Kevin Boyce (born 1971)	Democratic	Ohio	January 7, 2009	January 9, 2011	Lost reelection
	Chip Flowers (born 1974)	Democratic	Delaware	January 1, 2011	January 1, 2015	Retired
	Shawn Wooden (born 1970)	Democratic	Connecticut	January 3, 2019	January 4, 2023	Retired
	Erick Russell	Democratic	Connecticut	January 4, 2023	present	Incumbent

== Public utilities or railroad commissioners ==
Denotes incumbent statewide public utilities or railroad commissioner
- Italics denotes acting public utilities or railroad commissioner

Picture	Name	Party	State	Term start	Term end	Notes
	J. C. Watts (born 1957)	Republican	Oklahoma	January 14, 1991	1995	Resigned after being elected for Oklahoma's 4th congressional district
	David Burgess (born 1959)	Democratic	Georgia	1998	January 1, 2007	Lost re-election
	Michael L. Williams (born 1953)	Republican	Texas	January 3, 1999	March 31, 2011	Resigned
	Sandra Kennedy (born 1957)	Democratic	Arizona	January 5, 2009	January 7, 2013	Lost re-election
	Sandra Kennedy (born 1957)	Democratic	Arizona	January 7, 2019	January 2, 2023	Lost re-election
	Fitz Johnson (born 1963)	Republican	Georgia	August 26, 2021	January 1, 2026	
	Alicia Johnson (born 1972/73)	Democratic	Georgia	January 1, 2026	present	

== Elected State Boards of Education ==
Picture	Name	Party	State	Term start	Term end	Notes
	Alma Allen (born 1939)	Democratic	Texas	1995	2005	
	Lawrence Allen Jr. (born 1959)	Democratic	Texas	2005	2023	
	Aicha Davis	Democratic	Texas	2019	2024	Resigned to run successfully for Texas House of Representatives
	Staci Childs	Democratic	Texas	2023	present	
	LJ Francis	Republican	Texas	2023	present	

== See also ==
- African American officeholders from the end of the Civil War until before 1900
- List of African-American officeholders (1900–1959)
- List of African-American Republicans
- List of African-American firsts
- List of first African-American mayors
