= Charles Way =

American football player (born 1972)

Personal details
- Born: December 27, 1972 (age 53) Philadelphia, Pennsylvania, U.S.
- Spouse: Tahesha Wright
- Children: 4
- Education: University of Virginia
- Football career

No. 30
- Position: Fullback

Career information
- College: Virginia
- NFL draft: 1995: 6th round, 206th overall pick

Career history
- New York Giants (1995–1999)
- Stats at Pro Football Reference

Charles Christopher Way (born December 27, 1972) is an American former professional football player who was a fullback in the National Football League (NFL) for five seasons for the New York Giants. He was the Second Gentleman of New Jersey from 2023 to 2026, as the husband of Lieutenant Governor Tahesha Way.

== Early life and college ==
Way was born in 1972 to Jacqueline and Cleveland Way. He graduated from Northeast High School in Philadelphia, after which he attended the University of Virginia.

== Professional career ==
Way was selected by the New York Giants in the sixth round of the 1995 NFL draft with the 206th overall pick, and started in four games his rookie year. Primarily used as a fullback, blocking for Rodney Hampton, Way finished the year with 71 total yards (65 of which were receiving yards) and one touchdown, scoring in week six.

He started 13 games his second year, again primarily used as a blocker. He scored two touchdowns and finished the year with 79 rushing yards and 328 receiving yards.

Way's breakout year was in 1997. Given the starting halfback job after Hampton went down with an injury, Way made the most of his opportunity, rushing for 696 yards and gaining 1,001 all purpose yards, and scored five touchdowns (four rushing). He also rushed for 114 yards against Arizona in week twelve, the only time in his career that he broke the century mark. His contributions helped lead the Giants to the division championship and a home playoff game against the Minnesota Vikings, but the Giants blew a 19–3 lead and lost the game 23–22.

Way's numbers fell off slightly in 1998, but he still managed to score four touchdowns and rush for 432 yards. His career was halted by a chronic knee injury, and he announced his retirement in 2000.

== Post-playing career ==
After his playing career, Way spent 14 years with the Giants as their director of player development. In 2014, he became head of the NFL's player engagement department.

== Personal life ==
Way lives in Wayne, New Jersey, with his wife Tahesha, who previously served as New Jersey's Lieutenant Governor, Secretary of State, and as a member of the Passaic County Board of Chosen Freeholders. Charles and Tahesha have four children.
