= Secretary of State of New Jersey =

New Jersey executive officer

- Seal of the Secretary of State

- Incumbent; Shirley Emehelu since November 9, 2026
- New Jersey Department of State
- Type: Secretary of state
- Member of: Cabinet of New Jersey
- Reports to: Governor of New Jersey
- Seat: New Jersey State House; Trenton, New Jersey
- Appointer: The governor; with advice and consent of the Senate (Note: If the nominee is the lieutenant governor, then the governor may appoint them without the Senate's advice and consent. See N.J. Const. art. V, § IV, para. 3.)
- Term length: During the term of office of the governor
- Constituting instrument: N.J. Stat. Ann. § 52:16A-2
- Formation: July 2, 1776; 250 years ago
- First holder: Charles Pettit
- Website: nj.gov/state

The secretary of state of New Jersey is a member of the executive branch of the government of the U.S. state of New Jersey and is one of the original state offices. The secretary oversees the Department of State, as well as artistic, cultural, and historical programs, and volunteerism and community service, projects within the state. The secretary is also the keeper of the Great Seal of the State and is appointed by the governor.

The department's agencies include the State Archives, the New Jersey State Museum, the Division of Elections, the Division of Programs, the Business Action Center, the Council on the Arts, the Historical Commission, the Cultural Based Initiatives, the Center for Hispanic Research and Development, the Office for Planning Advocacy and the State Planning Commission. The secretary of higher education, the Higher Education Student Assistance Authority, the State Library, and the Sports and Exposition Authority are in but not of the department.

The New Jersey Division of Archives and Records Management, sometimes referred to simply as the "State Archives", is the repository for all vital statistics, including marriage and divorce records and birth certificates, and also maintains a separate set of files for the registry of wills. The secretary of state oversees the Division of Tourism which advertises and promotes New Jersey as a premier travel destination and the Division of Elections, and sets all tourism and election policy.

The secretary is the chief elections officer of New Jersey. Prior to April 1, 2008, the electoral division was under the state attorney general. The secretary of state is also the chair of the Board of State Canvassers, which certifies election results for federal and state office elections and public questions.

In New Jersey, registry of corporations is not the responsibility of the secretary of state. The New Jersey Department of the Treasury is responsible for the maintenance of corporate records.

In New Jersey, the secretary of state serves a term of office concurrent with that of the governor. Although the conventional wisdom is that the secretary of state cannot be removed from office except "for cause" by the governor or by way of legislative impeachment, a recent law review article argues that the governor does not have the authority to remove the secretary of state "for cause," and this issue has not been tested.

The Secretary of State and Lieutenant Governor was Dale Caldwell until his resignation on September 25, 2026. Shirley Emehelu assumed office as Lieutenant Governor and Secretary of State on November 9, 2026.

== List of officeholders ==
Holders of the office of Secretary of State include:

#	Image	Secretary of State	Term	Governor	Party
1		Charles Pettit	1776–1779	William Livingston	
2		Bowes Reed	1778–1794		
3		Samuel W. Stockton	1794–1795	Richard Howell	
4		John Beatty	1795–1805		
5		James Linn	1805–1820		Democratic Republican
6		Daniel Coleman	1820–1830		
7		James Westcott	1830–1840		
8		Charles McChesney	1840–1851		
9		Thomas Allison	1851–1861		
10		Whitfield Johnson	1861–1866		
11		Horace Congar	1866–1870		
12		Henry Kelsey	1870–1897		
13		George Wurts	1897–1902		
14		Samuel Dickinson	1902–1912		
15		David Crater	1912–1915	Woodrow Wilson	
16		Thomas Martin	1915–1926		
17		Joseph Fitzpatrick	1926–1931	A. Harry Moore (1926–1929); Morgan Foster Larson (1929–1931)	
18		Thomas A. Mathis	1931–1941	Morgan Foster Larson (1931–1932); A. Harry Moore (1931–1935); Harold G. Hoffman (1935–1938); A. Harry Moore (1938–1941)	Republican
19		Joseph Brophy	1941–1946	Charles Edison (1941–1944); Walter F. Edge (1944–1947)	
20		Lloyd B. Marsh	1946–1954	Walter F. Edge; Alfred E. Driscoll (1947–1953)	Republican
21		Edward J. Patten	1954–1962	Robert B. Meyner (1954–1962)	Democratic
22		Robert J. Burkhardt	1962–1970	Richard J. Hughes (1962–1970)	Democratic
23		Paul Sherwin	1970–1972	William T. Cahill (1970–1974)	Republican
Acting		Robert Falcey	1972–1974	William T. Cahill	
24		J. Edward Crabiel	1974–1977	Brendan Byrne	Democratic
Acting		Francis Carragher	1977	Brendan Byrne	Democratic
Acting		George Lee	1977	Brendan Byrne	Democratic
25		Donald Lan	1977–1982	Brendan Byrne	Democratic
26		Jane Burgio	1982–1990	Thomas Kean (1982–1990)	Republican
27		Joan Haberle	1990–1992	James Florio (1990–94)	Democratic
28		Daniel Dalton	1992–1994	James Florio (1990–94)	Democratic
29		Lonna Hooks	1994–1998	Christine Todd Whitman (1994–2001)	Republican
Acting		Carol Cronheim	1998–1999	Christine Todd Whitman (1994–2001)	Republican
30		DeForest Soaries	1999–2002	Christine Todd Whitman; Donald DiFrancesco (2001–2002)	Republican
31		Regena Thomas	2002–2006	James E. McGreevey (2002–2004); Richard Codey (2004–2006)	Democratic
32		Nina Mitchell Wells	2006–2010	Jon S. Corzine (2006–2010)	Democratic
33		Kim Guadagno	2010–2018	Chris Christie (2010–2018)	Republican
34		Tahesha Way	2018–2026	Phil Murphy (2018–2026)	Democratic
35		Dale Caldwell	2026	Mikie Sherrill (2026–present)	Democratic
36		Shirley Emehelu	2026–present	Mikie Sherrill (2026–present)	Democratic
