= Princeton Design Guild =

American design-build firm

- Type: Private
- Industry: Architecture, construction, custom woodwork, historic preservation
- Founded: 1985
- Founder: Kevin Wilkes
- Website: www.pdguild.com

Princeton Design Guild (PDG) is the name of an umbrella organization that includes the American construction company PDG Construction and the architecture firm Wilkes Architects.

Founded by architect Kevin Wilkes (a graduate of Princeton University in 1983 and Yale University in 1991) in 1985, PDG developed into an integrated design-build practice that combines architectural design with construction, along with custom woodworking and fabrication, historic preservation, and custom millwork. Its work has included residential architecture, renovation and new construction, commercial and municipal projects, historic preservation, and public art installations.

== History ==
=== Founding and early work ===
Princeton Design Guild (PDG) was founded by architect Kevin Wilkes in 1985 in Princeton, New Jersey. The Guild developed as an architecture and design-build practice, with architectural design and construction carried out under a single operation.

While an undergraduate at Princeton University, Wilkes — an architecture major — designed sets and costumes for approximately two dozen campus productions and studied scene design. He took three years away from Princeton between his sophomore and junior years to work at McCarter Theatre, first as a scenic artist and later as an assistant technical director, before designing stage sets in New York City.

Another project dating from Wilkes's undergraduate years became one of PDG's earliest projects—and its first completed house: a renovated prefabricated ranch house at the corner of Harrison and Sycamore Streets in Princeton. Contemporary coverage in *The Trenton Times* in 1985 described the transformation of the 1950s house and Wilkes's hands-on involvement in carpentry and masonry. The project was later known as Villa Speranza. An April 1989 profile in Architectural Digest identified it as PDG's first completed house and stated that it had been completed in 1987. The approximately 1,750-square-foot house was extensively remodeled, with its interior reorganized around a central corridor and its exterior altered while its basic form was retained. Nicholas Ulanov purchased the house shortly before its completion.

Wilkes's early residential work was also included in Donald Prowler's *Modest Mansions: Design Ideas for Luxurious Living in Less Space*, published in 1985. A photograph on page 117 identifies the project as the “Wilkes House” and credits its design to Wilkes.

In 1988, Wilkes received an Architecture Fellowship Grant from the New Jersey State Council on the Arts. He later earned a Master of Architecture degree from Yale University in 1991.

=== Development of the design-build practice ===
During the 1990s, PDG expanded from its early residential work into an integrated design-build operation combining architectural design, construction, and custom millwork fabrication. A 2008 profile published by the National Institute of Child Health and Human Development described Princeton Design Guild as a “design-build collaborative of architects and craftsmen.”

The Guild's work included both new construction and the rehabilitation of existing buildings. In 2000, *Fine Homebuilding* published an article by Wilkes describing PDG's reconstruction of a large nineteenth-century porch on a three-story manor in central New Jersey. The project included new structural footings and masonry piers, custom columns, a new roof, and custom-fabricated mahogany arches, keystones, and railings. The article identified Wilkes as the founder of Princeton Design Guild.

By 1999, PDG operated a design, construction, and fabrication business in Belle Mead, New Jersey. The Guild maintained woodworking facilities for producing custom architectural elements including doors, cornices, columns, mantels, moldings, flooring, cabinetry, and furniture. Its construction operation handled work ranging from excavation and foundations to framing, roofing, utilities, and mechanical systems, while the Guild also managed municipal approvals and permitting.

A 2020 *Town Topics* profile marking PDG's 35th anniversary reported that the Guild occupied approximately 20,000 square feet in three buildings in Belle Mead and employed 20 full-time workers. The company had completed more than 500 residential and commercial projects in locations ranging from Florida to Manhattan. While residential renovation had initially been the PDG's primary focus, commercial work had grown to approximately half of its activity. The Guild continued to combine architectural design, construction, and fabrication, including woodworking and metalworking, within its operations.

=== Civic and public projects ===
PDG's projects expanded beyond private residential work to include municipal, commercial, and public projects. It organized and managed the public design charrette for the design of the new Princeton Township Municipal Building and later served as architect of record for the Remembrance Fountain in South Brunswick Township, a memorial to local residents who died in the September 11 attacks.

PDG also became involved in a series of temporary public-art and garden projects in Princeton. The Guild's work included Writers Block, established in 2004, and Quark Park, established in 2006. Both were developed by Peter Söderman, architect Kevin Wilkes, and landscape architect Alan Goodheart and brought Princeton scientists and engineers together with artists and designers to create installations on a vacant lot in Princeton.

Writers Block consisted of a series of architectural pavilions created through collaborations between Princeton-area writers and architects, including members of Princeton University's School of Architecture. The structures were dedicated to writers and Princeton faculty members, and the garden was intended both as a place for contemplation and exploration and as a venue for community events. The installation was temporary and was scheduled to be dismantled and its structures auctioned for charity later in 2004.

Quark Park was conceived as a temporary garden in which art and landscape design could make scientific ideas accessible to the public. The project brought together twelve teams of artists, scientists, and landscape designers. Its development followed a meeting between project organizers Peter Söderman and Jeff Nathanson and physicist Freeman Dyson at the Institute for Advanced Study; Dyson subsequently participated in the project with rocket scientist and U.S. Congressman Rush Holt.

Writers Block received an Honor Award for a Built Project from the New Jersey chapter of the American Institute of Architects and a New Jersey Office of Smart Growth award for Creative Initiative. Quark Park subsequently received recognition from professional architecture and planning organizations.

=== Sustainable construction and accessibility ===
In 2010, PDG partnered with Community Options and Hopewell Township on a sustainable group home for four people with disabilities. PDG managed the project's architecture and construction. The project was designed to meet LEED for Homes standards and incorporated extensive material reuse and recycling, including the planned salvage of more than 10,000 board feet of lumber from an existing barn and reuse of the farmhouse's timber frame, flooring, and siding for historic-restoration projects.

=== Historic preservation and adaptive reuse ===
Historic preservation and renovation became an important part of PDG's practice. Its projects have included the restoration and adaptive reuse of existing residential, commercial, and historic structures.

PDG participated in the adaptive reuse of Princeton's former United States Post Office in Palmer Square as Triumph Restaurant & Brewery. The project, which followed several years of planning and construction, involved the restoration of significant portions of the approximately 90-year-old building while incorporating new uses and building systems. Wilkes served as the owner's representative and helped oversee the project team. Princeton Design Guild performed historic-preservation woodworking and contemporary millwork and worked with Massimo Building Corporation on the project.

PDG has also undertaken the restoration of the childhood home of actor, singer, scholar, and human-rights activist Paul Robeson at 110 Witherspoon Street in Princeton. The restoration seeks to preserve the building's historic footprint and exterior while rebuilding deteriorated portions of the interior and installing new building systems.

The restoration has involved extensive investigation of the building's physical history. Because no historic photograph of the house has been found, the project team has examined the structure itself to determine which elements are original. Workers uncovered original clapboard siding, multiple layers of flooring, and personal objects left between successive renovations, as well as evidence from the building's later use as a boarding house.

In July 2026, after more than a decade of work, *Town Topics* reported that the Robeson House had entered its final phase of construction. The three-story building will soon be a community resource, with the first floor becoming the Robeson Gallery, the second floor providing meeting rooms and nonprofit office space, and the third floor providing temporary lodging. A rear courtyard will provide additional gathering space.

=== Awards & Recognition ===
Princeton Design Guild and its principal, Kevin Wilkes, have received recognition from professional and civic organizations for architectural design, remodeling, and community-oriented projects. In 2004, Wilkes and Kluck Architects received an AIA New Jersey Honor Award for Built Projects for Writers Block in Princeton. The project was subsequently recognized with a 2005 Smart Growth Architecture Award for Creative Initiative from the New Jersey Department of Community Affairs' Office of Smart Growth.

In 2006, Quark Park in Princeton received an AIA New Jersey Design Merit Award. The project was also recognized by the New Jersey Chapter of the American Planning Association with an Outstanding Implementation award for "Temporary Projects with Long Term Consequences." The AIA award is independently listed in the professional history of architect Joshua Zinder, who was involved with the Quark Park project.

In 2019, Remodeling magazine named Wilkes and Princeton Design Guild to its Big50, recognizing the firm among leading remodeling companies in the United States. At the time, the company reported 34 years in business, $2.9 million in 2018 volume, and a staff of 20. The profile described Princeton Design Guild as a design-build operation in which architects and tradespeople worked alongside woodworking, stone-fabrication, and metal-fabrication facilities.
