= Ly Harding =

German-born American painter and sculptor

Ly Stellar Harding
- Born: Ly Stellar; 1881; Germany
- Died: October 7, 1968 (aged 86–87); East Orange, New Jersey, U.S.
- Other names: Ly Harding; Ly Stellar Harding
- Known for: Painting, sculpture
- Spouse: Hugo Harding

Ly Stellar Harding (1881 – 7 October 1968) was a German-born American painter, sculptor, and art educator based in Montclair, New Jersey. She was known for landscape and floral paintings as well as sculpture, and exhibited in museums and artist-association shows throughout New Jersey and the northeastern United States.

== Early life and education ==
Harding was born in Germany in 1881. She traveled widely in Europe while receiving her education and artistic training. Much of her formal art study took place in Paris and Brussels.

In 1907 she emigrated to the United States, where she continued her studies in Chicago and New York City.

== Career ==
After settling in New Jersey, Harding established herself as a painter and sculptor in Montclair. Her work included landscapes, floral subjects, and still lifes, as well as figurative sculpture. Contemporary descriptions note that she worked in a variety of media in both painting and sculpture.

Harding exhibited in museums and regional venues in both Europe and the United States. In New Jersey her work appeared in shows at the Montclair Art Museum, the Newark Museum, and the New Jersey State Museum in Trenton, New Jersey. She also took part in exhibitions organized by the Associated Artists of New Jersey. At the Visual Arts Center of New Jersey in Summit, her work was shown in the 1948 exhibition "Paintings and Sculpture of the Associated Artists of New Jersey," where she was listed among participating artists as "Ly Harding".

In addition to exhibiting, Harding taught private art lessons throughout the Oranges in northern New Jersey and served as secretary of the Associated Artists of New Jersey. Her work has continued to appear on the art market; auction records describe her as "Ly Stellar Harding (American/New Jersey, 1881–1968)". Paintings such as Still Life with Mandolin have been offered by galleries and collectors into the 21st century.

== Personal life ==
Harding lived for many years at 7 Yale Terrace in Montclair, New Jersey. In 1915 she married Dr. Hugo Harding, a chemist noted for work on early synthetic rubber and artificial silk; he died in 1948.

Harding was a member of the local Unitarian community in Montclair, where a memorial service for her was held following her death. She died at East Orange General Hospital in East Orange, New Jersey, on 7 October 1968, at the age of 87.

== Legacy ==
Harding is remembered as part of the circle of mid-20th-century artists active in New Jersey, alongside painters and sculptors associated with the Associated Artists of New Jersey and other regional groups. Examples of her work are held in private collections, and she is listed in art reference databases and auction records in the United States and Europe.
