= Governor of New Jersey =

Head of government of the U.S. state of New Jersey

- Coat of arms of the state of New Jersey

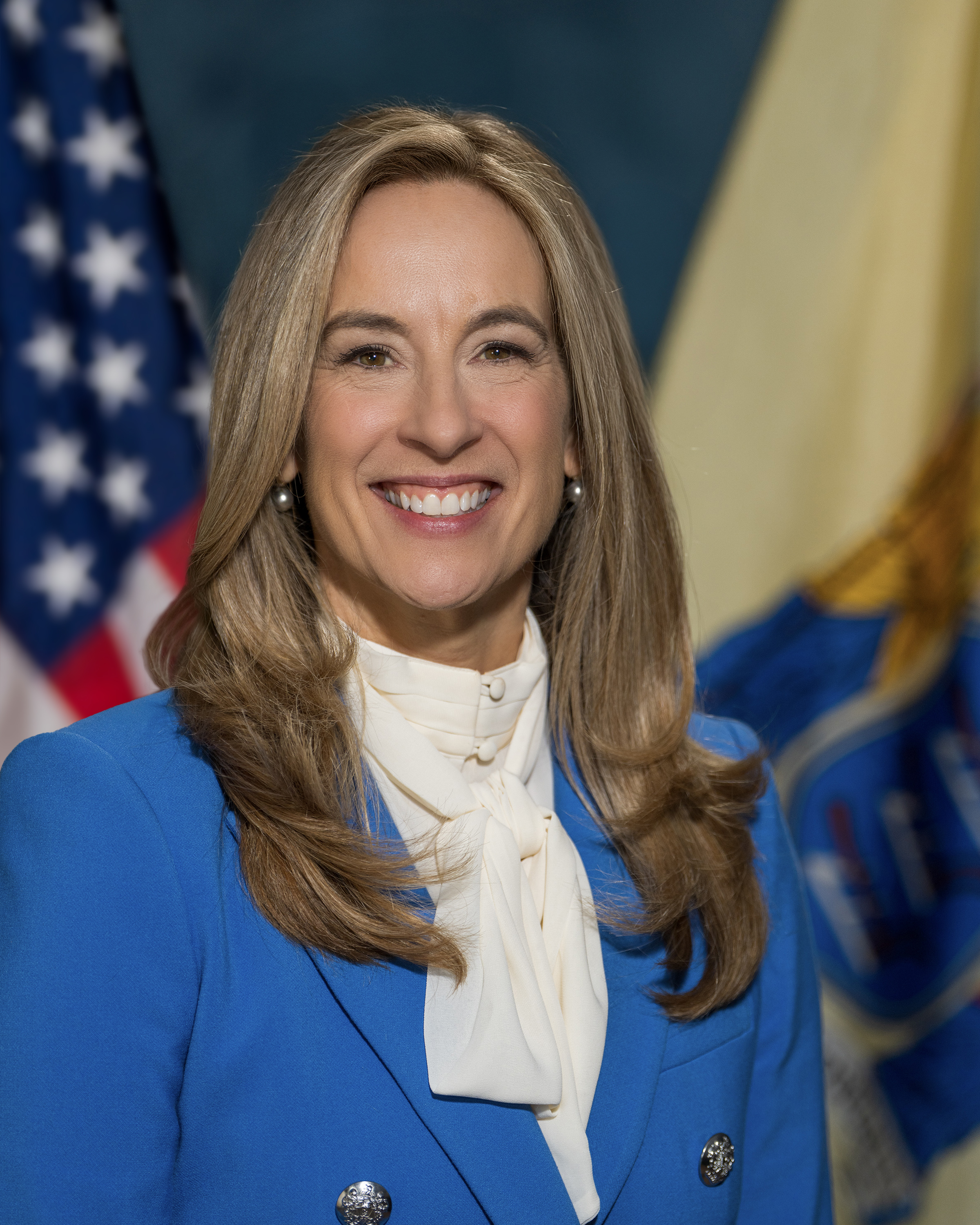
- Incumbent; Mikie Sherrill since January 20, 2026
- Style: Governor (informal); The Honorable (formal)
- Status: Head of state; Head of government
- Residence: Drumthwacket
- Seat: Trenton, New Jersey
- Term length: Four years, renewable once consecutively
- Constituting instrument: New Jersey Constitution of 1776
- Precursor: Governor of New Jersey (Great Britain)
- Inaugural holder: William Livingston
- Formation: August 31, 1776 (250 years ago)
- Succession: Line of succession
- Deputy: Lieutenant Governor of New Jersey
- Salary: $175,000
- Website: Official website

The governor of New Jersey is the head of government of the U.S. state of New Jersey. The office of governor is an elected position with a four-year term. There is a two consecutive term limit, with no limitation on non-consecutive terms. The official residence of the governor is Drumthwacket, a mansion located in Princeton, New Jersey. The governor's office is located inside the New Jersey State House in Trenton. New Jersey is notable as one of the few states in which the governor's official residence is not located in the state capital.

The first and longest-serving governor of New Jersey was William Livingston, who served from August 31, 1776, to July 25, 1790. A. Harry Moore remains the longest-serving popularly elected governor. The current and 57th governor is Mikie Sherrill, a Democrat who assumed office on January 20, 2026.

== Role ==
The governor is directly elected by the voters to become the political and ceremonial head of the state. The governor performs the executive functions of the state and is not directly subordinate to the federal authorities. The governor assumes additional roles, such as being the commander-in-chief of the New Jersey National Guard forces (when they are not federalized).

Unlike many other states that have elections for some cabinet-level positions, under the New Jersey Constitution the governor and lieutenant governor are the only officials elected on a statewide basis. Much like the president of the United States, the governor appoints the entire cabinet, subject to confirmation by the New Jersey Senate. More importantly, under the New Jersey constitution, the governor appoints all superior court judges and county prosecutors, although this is done with strong consideration of the preferences of the individual state senators who represent the district where vacancies arise. The governor is also responsible for appointing two constitutionally created officers, the New Jersey attorney general and the secretary of state of New Jersey, with the approval of the Senate.

As amended in January 2002, state law allows for a maximum salary of $175,000. Phil Murphy stated his intention to accept the full salary. Jon Corzine accepted a token salary of $1 per year as governor. Previous governor Jim McGreevey received an annual salary of $157,000, a 10% reduction of the maximum allowed, while Chris Christie, Murphy's immediate predecessor, accepted the full gubernatorial salary.

The governor has a full-time protective security detail from the Executive Protection Unit of the New Jersey State Police while in office. A former governor is entitled to a one-person security detail from the New Jersey State Police for up to six months after leaving office.

== Oath of office ==
"I, [name of governor], elected governor of the state of New Jersey, do solemnly promise and swear that I will diligently, faithfully and to the best of my knowledge, execute the said office in conformity with the powers delegated to me; and that I will to the utmost of my skill and ability, promote the peace and prosperity and maintain the lawful rights of the said state. So help me God."

== Lieutenant governor ==
On November 8, 2005, voters passed an amendment to the New Jersey State Constitution that created the position of Lieutenant Governor of New Jersey, effective with the 2009 gubernatorial election. Before this amendment was passed, the President of the New Jersey Senate would simultaneously serve as governor whenever the office of governor was vacant. This dual position was more powerful than that of an elected governor, as the individual would have a major role in both the legislative and executive branches.

The amendment was prompted by New Jersey State Senate President Richard Codey serving as Governor of New Jersey in January 2002 and again from November 2004 to January 2006 after the resignations of elected Governors Christine Todd Whitman and Jim McGreevey.

Kim Guadagno, a former prosecutor, was sworn in as New Jersey's first lieutenant governor on January 19, 2010, under Governor Chris Christie. Guadagno was succeeded by former assemblywoman Sheila Oliver, who was sworn in on January 16, 2018, under Governor Phil Murphy. On August 1, 2023, the lieutenant governor position became vacant when Oliver died in office. On September 8, 2023, Governor Murphy selected Tahesha Way, New Jersey's Secretary of State, as the third lieutenant governor of New Jersey, to succeed Oliver and serve out the remainder of Oliver's term. In January 2026, Dale Caldwell took office as lieutenant governor under Governor Mikie Sherrill. On September 25, 2026, Caldwell resigned from office after the release of a report which alleged that he had engaged in sexual harassment and ethics violations.

== Center on the American Governor ==
In 2005, the Center on the American Governor was established at the Eagleton Institute of Politics at Rutgers University to study the governors of New Jersey and, to a lesser degree, the governors of other states. The program features extensive archives of documents and pictures from the Byrne, Kean, Florio, Whitman, and Corzine administrations, video interviews with many members of the respective administrations, information on other American governors, and news updates on all fifty current governors.

== Timeline ==
Timeline of New Jersey governors

== See also ==
- Governorship of Phil Murphy
- List of colonial governors of New Jersey
- List of governors of New Jersey (1776–present)

U.S. order of precedence (ceremonial)
| Preceded by Vice President | Order of precedence of the United States; Within New Jersey | Succeeded by Mayor of municipality in which event is held |
| Preceded by Vice President | Order of precedence of the United States; Within New Jersey | Succeeded by Otherwise Speaker of the U.S. House of Representatives |
| Preceded by Governor of Pennsylvania | Order of precedence of the United States; Outside New Jersey | Succeeded by Governor of Georgia |
