= Jacob Landau (artist) =

American painter

- Jacob Landau, 1996
- Born: December 17, 1917; Philadelphia, Pennsylvania
- Died: November 24, 2001 (aged 83); Roosevelt, New Jersey
- Known for: printmaking
- Website: jacoblandau.org

Jacob Landau (December 17, 1917 – November 24, 2001) was an American artist best known for his evocative works on the human condition. Typically, his works address the Great Depression, World War II, and the impact of technology and politics on individuals and their surroundings. Landau's works can be found in the permanent collections of the Metropolitan Museum of Art, the Library of Congress, the Museum of Modern Art, and the National Gallery.

== Biography ==
Landau was born December 17, 1917, in Philadelphia, Pennsylvania. By the age of three he began drawing everything around him. When he was 12, he began studying at the Graphic Sketch Club, now the Samuel Fleisher Memorial. At the age of 17, Landau's illustrations for Kipling's Jungle Book won a competition in Scholastic Magazine. He won the competition the following year as well. In 1935, Landau received a scholarship from the Museum School of Industrial Art (today the University of the Arts) to study illustration, printmaking and painting. After his graduation in 1939, Landau moved to New York City where he experimented with a variety of styles, treatments and media. His first phase as a professional artist included illustrating books and magazines.

In 1943, Landau was drafted into the armed forces, serving two years overseas in the Mediterranean Theater. In the army, Landau served in a number of capacities which utilized his artistic talents. His service in Italy included work as the art editor, photographer, and reporter of At Ease, a special services magazine. After his discharge in 1946, Landau used the G.I. Bill to further study art.

Landau spent a year (1948–1949) at New York's New School for Social Research before moving to Paris with his wife, Frances, and young son to study at the Academie Julian and the Academie de la Grande Chaumiere. While in Paris, Landau met printmaker Leonard Baskin, who taught him the medium of woodcuts.

From 1954 to 1957 Landau taught at the Philadelphia College of Art before moving to Pratt Institute where he would teach for over 20 years. During his time at Pratt, Landau helped to establish the University Without Walls program, in which students worked closely with instructors to gain hands-on experience. In 1975, Landau became a faculty member of the Artist Teacher Institute, a 10-day summer residency program sponsored by the New Jersey State Council on the Arts.

In addition to his art and teaching, Landau was very involved in the community. He was active in many different organizations including: Alliance for Arts Education, American Humanist Association, Association for Humanistic Psychology, Coalition for Nuclear Disarmament, International Arts Association, Jewish Federation, Linkage Project, New Jersey School for the Arts, Printmaking Council, and World Futures Society. In 1974 he was elected into the National Academy of Design as an Associate member and became a full Academician in 1979.

Landau and his wife Frances lived in Roosevelt, New Jersey as part of a small community of artists. There he built a geodesic dome which was created as an art studio. His wife died in 1993 of Alzheimer's disease. They had two sons, Jonas and Stefan.

Jacob Landau died on November 24, 2001, at the age of 85, and is buried in the Roosevelt Cemetery near his friends Ben Shahn and Gregorio Prestopino. After his death, the Jacob Landau Institute was formed to preserve his legacy, share his unique philosophy of education, and nurture individual artists.

== Artwork ==
Landau's art communicates his consciousness of humankind's predicament, its beauty and its horror. Growing up during the Great Depression and having been profoundly affected by The Holocaust, Landau's work expresses the self-inflicted human turmoil of the 20th century. He often drew from biblical or literary sources, presenting unpleasant topics in a way that emphasized the unlimited possibilities of peace and greater understanding. Existential philosopher Walter Kauffman described Landau's work as "unmistakenly modern and at the same time in the tradition of Goya and Blake." Landau's works can be found in the permanent collections of the Library of Congress, the Museum of Modern Art, the National Gallery, and the Smithsonian American Art Museum.

== Select exhibitions ==
Landau's work has been exhibited in over 30 one-man and 200 group shows, both nationally and internationally.

- "Le Drame Quotidien," Galerie Paul Lebar, Paris, April–May 1952
- "The Insiders," Cober Gallery, New York City, November 8–26, 1960
- "Three Artists View the Human Condition," New Jersey State Museum, June–September 1968
- "Human Concern/Personal Torment," Whitney Museum, New York City, October–November 1969
- "Kingdom of Dreams," Associated American Artists, New York City, February 2–21, 1970
- ”Jacob Landau: Apocalyptic And Prophetic Works 1967-76,” ACA Galleries, New York City, October–November 1976
- "Jacob Landau: The Graphic Work," New Jersey State Museum, June–August 1981
- "Jacob Landau: A Print Retrospective," Philadelphia Art Alliance, September–October 1981
- "International Printmaking Invitational," The Art Gallery, California State College at San Bernardino, April–May 1983
- "From the Capital to the Cape: A Celebration of New Jersey Artists," Noyes Museum, Oceanville, NJ, June–September 1983
- "Dreams and Nightmares: Utopian Visions in Modern Art," Hirschhorn Museum, Washington, DC, 1983–1984
- "The Prophetic Quest," Temple Judea Museum of Kenneth Israel, Elkins Park, PA, March–June 1995
- "Old Man Mad about Drawing," Monmouth University, West Long Branch, NJ, February 7–26, 1997
- "Unlimited Possibilities: Jacob Landau Works on Paper 1950 – 2000," Erdman Gallery, Princeton Theological Seminary, Princeton, NJ, October–December 2001

== Book illustration ==
In addition to his numerous paintings, lithographs, sketches and drawings, Landau illustrated books. Below are some examples:

- Watkins, L. A. Rhumbo. New York: Grosset and Dunlap, 1937.
- Poe, Edgar Allan. Gold Bug. New York: Macmillan, 1953.
- Beals, Carleton. Adventure on the Western Sea. New York: Holt, 1956.
- Call, Hughie. Rising Arrow. New York: Viking, 1955.
- Appel, Benjamin. Man and Magic. New York: Pantheon, 1966.
- Friedlander, Albert H. Out of the Whirlwind. New York: Union of American Hebrew Congregations, 1968.
- Hoffmann, E. T. A. Tales of E. T. A. Hoffmann. Chicago: University of Chicago Press, 1972.
- Herrstrom, David Sten. Appearing by Daylight. Huntington, WV: Aegina Press, 1989.
- Herrstrom, David Sten. Jonah's Disappearance. Tarzana, CA: 1992.

== Collections of Landau's work ==
The Jacob Landau Institute was founded to preserve the memory and legacy of Jacob Landau. The institute has established two major cooperative agreements to this end. Drew University Library permanently houses the Jacob Landau Archive, which includes his papers, artwork, and books. The Library is currently working to organize and preserve the materials in the Archive for the use and longevity of Landau's legacy. The Jacob Landau Institute works in conjunction with Monmouth University in West Long Branch, New Jersey to create educational programs that have far reaching benefits for the artistic community and general population of Monmouth County and beyond.
