= New Jersey Department of State =

- Seal of the Secretary of State of New Jersey

- Logo of the NJDOS

Department overview
- Formed: January 1, 1949; 77 years ago
- Jurisdiction: Government of New Jersey
- Headquarters: 225 West State Street, Trenton, New Jersey
- Annual budget: US$2 billion (FY2027)
- Department executive: Shirley Emehelu, Secretary of State
- Website: nj.gov/state

The New Jersey Department of State (NJDOS) is a principal department in the executive branch of the New Jersey government responsible for administering elections, maintaining official records, business and economic development, cultural affairs, and civic engagement. The department is headed by the New Jersey Secretary of State.

== Organization ==
The Department of State is divided into several divisions and agencies:

- Division of Elections
- Division of Travel & Tourism
- Business Action Center
- New Jersey State Museum
- New Jersey State Archives
- New Jersey Council on the Arts
- New Jersey Cultural Trust
- New Jersey Historical Commission
- Cultural Heritage Commissions

== Related legislation ==
- 1948: Department of State Act of 1948, P.L. 1948, c. 445
