= Alma Allen (politician) =

American politician from Texas (born 1939)

Alma A. Allen

Member of the Texas House of Representatives from the 131st district
- Incumbent
- Assumed office January 11, 2005
- Preceded by: Ronald R. "Ron" Wilson

Personal details
- Born: April 7, 1939 (age 87)
- Party: Democratic
- Spouse: Lawrence A. Allen Sr.
- Children: Lawrence Allen Jr.

Alma Toliver Allen (born April 7, 1939) is a Democratic member of the Texas House of Representatives for District 131 in Harris County, Texas. She became a representative in 2004 after serving on the Texas State Board of Education for ten years (her son, Lawrence Allen Jr., succeeded her in this office).

Allen won her eighth term in the legislature in the general election held on November 6, 2018. With 35,878 votes (85.8 percent), she overwhelmed the Republican candidate, Syed S. Ali, who polled 5,926 votes (14.2 percent). Allen took office on January 11, 2005.

She originates from the Sunnyside neighborhood of Houston.

Texas House of Representatives
Preceded by Ronald R. "Ron" Wilson	Texas State Representative for District 131 (Harris County); 2004–	Succeeded by Incumbent
