= New Jersey Historical Commission =

Government agency in New Jersey, United States

State of New Jersey Historical Commission

Agency overview
- Jurisdiction: New Jersey
- Headquarters: 225 West State Street, 4th Floor, Trenton, NJ 08625-0305
- Agency executives: Michael Fernandez, Chair; Sara Cureton, Executive director
- Parent agency: New Jersey Department of State
- Website: http://www.nj.gov/state/historical/index.html

The New Jersey Historical Commission is a government agency of the U.S. state of New Jersey. It is committed to preserving the historical record and advancing interest in and awareness of New Jersey's past through Grant funding, Educational Initiative, Diversity and Inclusion, and Public Outreach.
