= Tahesha Way =

American politician

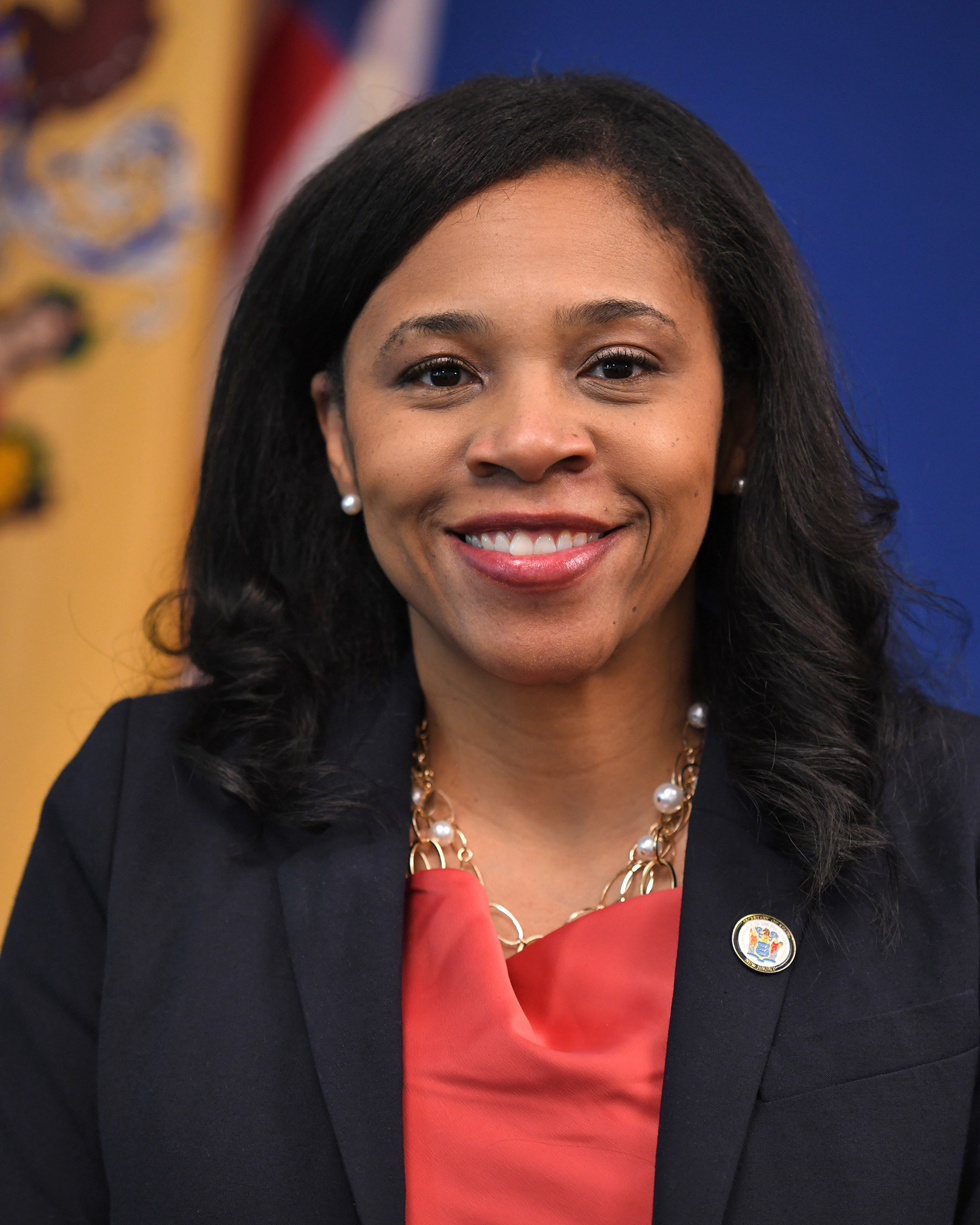
- Official portrait, 2022

3rd Lieutenant Governor of New Jersey
- In office September 8, 2023 – January 20, 2026
- Governor: Phil Murphy
- Preceded by: Sheila Oliver
- Succeeded by: Dale Caldwell

34th Secretary of State of New Jersey
- In office January 16, 2018 – January 20, 2026
- Governor: Phil Murphy
- Preceded by: Kim Guadagno
- Succeeded by: Dale Caldwell

Member of the Passaic County Board of County Commissioners
- In office July 6, 2006 – January 7, 2010
- Preceded by: Lois Cuccinello
- Succeeded by: Deborah Ciambrone; Michael Marotta; Edward O'Connell

Personal details
- Born: Tahesha Leila Wright; 1971 or 1972 (age 54–55) New York City, New York, U.S.
- Party: Democratic
- Spouse: Charles Way
- Children: 4
- Education: Brown University (BA); University of Virginia (JD)

Tahesha Leila Way (née Wright; born 1971 or 1972) is an American politician and jurist from New Jersey. A member of the Democratic Party, she served as the state's third lieutenant governor from 2023 to 2026, and as its 34th secretary of State from 2018 to 2026. She was previously a member and director of the Board of Chosen Freeholders (now known as Board of Commissioners) in Passaic County, New Jersey.

== Background ==
Way earned her undergraduate degree in English and American literature from Brown University and a Juris Doctor degree from the University of Virginia School of Law. She worked as a law clerk, a television producer for Court TV, and a literature professor at Fairleigh Dickinson University.

== Career ==
Way was admitted to the state bar in 1998. She worked as a lawyer in Totowa, New Jersey, and as an administrative law judge.

Way was appointed to the Passaic County Board of Chosen Freeholders (now Board of Commissioners) in 2006. In December 2017, Governor-elect Phil Murphy selected Way as the next Secretary of State of New Jersey. She was sworn in as New Jersey's 34th Secretary of State on February 26, 2018.

On September 8, 2023, Murphy appointed Way as lieutenant governor of New Jersey, filling the vacancy triggered by the death of Sheila Oliver. As the lieutenant governor of New Jersey is constitutionally required to simultaneously hold an appointed cabinet position, Way continued to serve as Secretary of State.

In July 2024, Way was mentioned as a contender to be appointed by Murphy to replace Bob Menendez in the United States Senate, after Menendez announced that he would resign effective August 20 after being convicted in his corruption trial; Murphy ultimately chose George Helmy to take Menendez's seat.

In December 2025, Way announced her run to replace Mikie Sherrill in the 2026 New Jersey's 11th congressional district special election after Sherrill resigned to become the governor of New Jersey. She lost the Democratic primary to Analilia Mejia.

== Personal life ==
Way is married to former New York Giants running back Charles Way. They have four daughters.

== See also ==
- List of female lieutenant governors in the United States
- List of minority governors and lieutenant governors in the United States

Political offices
Preceded by Kim Guadagno	Secretary of State of New Jersey; 2018–2026	Succeeded by Dale Caldwell
Preceded by Sheila Oliver	Lieutenant Governor of New Jersey; 2023–2026	Succeeded by Dale Caldwell
