= Lawrence Allen Jr. =

American politician and educator from Texas

Member of the Texas State Board of Education for District 4
- In office January 1, 2005 – January 1, 2023
- Preceded by: Alma Allen
- Succeeded by: Staci Childs

Personal details
- Born: 1959 (age 66–67) Houston, Texas, US
- Party: Democratic
- Parent: Alma Allen
- Education: Prairie View A&M University

Lawrence Allen Jr. (born 1959) is an American politician and educator who served on the Texas State Board of Education from 2005 to 2023. A member of the Democratic Party, he is the son of Texas state legislator Alma Allen, who preceded him on the board.

== Life and career ==
Born in Houston in 1959, Allen received his bachelor's degree and two master's degrees from Prairie View A&M University. His mother is Alma Allen, a Texas state legislator who served on the Texas State Board of Education for ten years until 2004. He has taught at Lanier Middle School and Dowling Middle School and worked as assistant principal of Dowling Middle School, Jesse H. Jones High School, and Jack Yates High School. In addition, he has worked as principal of Jesse H. Jones High School. As of 2017, he was employed as director of special projects with the Houston Independent School District.

Allen was first elected to the Texas State Board of Education in November 2004 and seated in January 2005, succeeding his mother as the member for District 4 in the Houston area (Fort Bend and Harris counties). He served as vice chair of the board for two years, vice chair of the Committee on School Finance for eight years, and member of the Planning and Instruction committees. In 2010, Allen voted against a Board resolution vowing to reject school textbooks that depicted Islam overly favorably.

In 2022, Allen opted out of seeking reelection to the State Board of Education in order to run for a Houston-area seat in the Texas House of Representatives. He lost the Democratic primary by a wide margin of 63%-37% to Asian-American lawyer Daniel Lee, who went on to lose the general election to Republican nominee Jacey Jetton. Staci Childs, a Democrat, succeeded Allen on the State Board of Education.

Allen is a member of the Houston Association of School Administrators, the National Association of Secondary School Principals, and the National Association of Secondary School Principals. He is married with four children. He is a practicing Muslim.
