= Lieutenant Governor of New Jersey =

Second-highest elected office in New Jersey

- Coat of arms of the state of New Jersey

- Incumbent; Shirley Emehelu since November 9, 2026
- Style: Lieutenant Governor (informal); The Honorable (formal)
- Term length: Four years, renewable once consecutively
- Constituting instrument: New Jersey Constitution of 1947 (as amended, effective January 17, 2006)
- Inaugural holder: Kim Guadagno
- Formation: January 19, 2010
- Succession: First
- Salary: $210,000 (per year)

The lieutenant governor of New Jersey is an elected constitutional officer in the executive branch of the state government of New Jersey in the United States. The lieutenant governor is the second highest-ranking official in the state government and is elected concurrently on a ticket with the governor for a four-year term. The position itself does not carry any powers or duties other than to be next in the order of succession, but the state constitution requires that the lieutenant governor also be appointed to serve as the head of a cabinet-level department or administrative agency within the governor's administration, other than the position of Attorney General.

Prior to 2010, New Jersey was one of a few states in the United States that did not have a lieutenant governor to succeed to the governorship in the event of a vacancy in that office. For most of the state's (and previously the colony's) history, a vacancy in the position of governor was filled by the president of the State Senate (called the "Legislative Council" from 1776 to 1844), or during the colonial era by the president of the royal governor's Provincial Council.

After several episodes during which the state had multiple "acting governors" in the span of a few years following the resignations of Governor Christine Todd Whitman in 2001 and Governor James E. McGreevey in 2004, popular sentiment and political pressure from the state's residents and news media outlets sought a permanent and tenable solution to the issue of gubernatorial succession. A referendum put before the state's voters authorized the amendment of the state's constitution in 2006. This amendment provided for the state's first lieutenant governor to be elected in the state's 2009 gubernatorial election.

Republican Kim Guadagno was the first to serve in the post. Guadagno, previously the sheriff in Monmouth County, was chosen by Governor Chris Christie to be his running mate on the Republican Party ticket in the 2009 election. In 2017, Democratic New Jersey Assemblywoman and former Speaker of the Assembly Sheila Oliver was elected lieutenant governor as the running mate of Phil Murphy; she was sworn in as the state's second lieutenant governor on January 16, 2018 and served until her death on August 1, 2023. Then–Secretary of State Tahesha Way was appointed lieutenant governor on September 8, 2023. In 2025, then-President of Centenary University Dale Caldwell was elected lieutenant governor as the running mate of Governor Mikie Sherrill on the Democratic Party ticket in the 2025 election; he was sworn in as the first male lieutenant governor on January 20, 2026. Caldwell resigned in September 2026, and was succeeded by Shirley Emehelu in November 2026 after her appointment by Governor Sherrill.

== Gubernatorial succession (1776–2001) ==
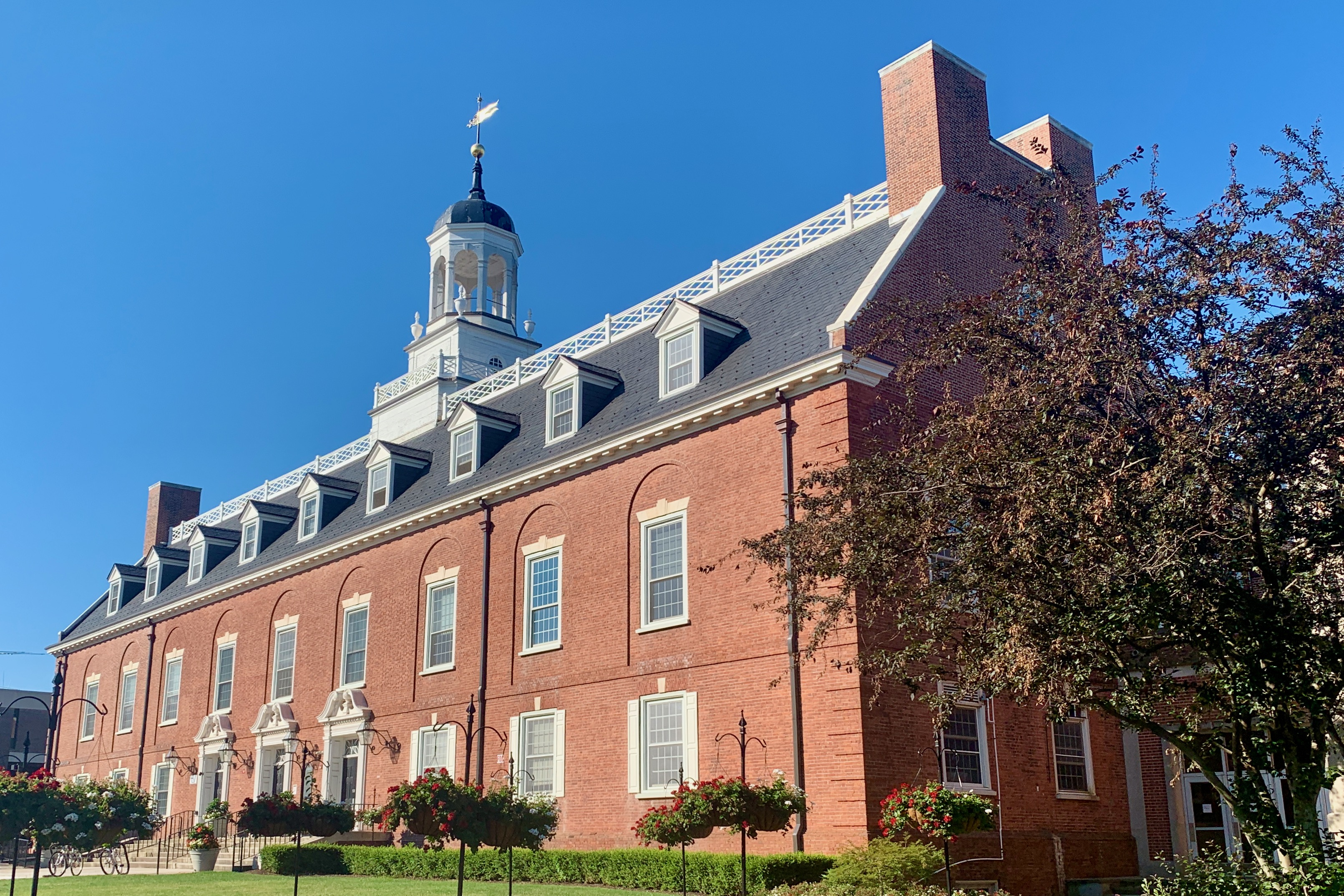
New Jersey's third constitution, adopted in 1947, was drafted at a convention held at College Avenue Gymnasium at Rutgers University. The convention rejected Governor Alfred E. Driscoll's proposal for a lieutenant governor.

Prior to the creation of the modern lieutenant governor position, the only state-wide, non-federal, elected official was the governor of New Jersey. New Jersey was one of eight states without a lieutenant governor and one of four states without any other state-wide elected official (including county prosecutors). Further, the state constitution does not provide for elections for state-wide cabinet-level positions—it grants the governor the power to appoint the "principal department heads" for the executive branch. For these reasons, New Jersey's governor was considered the most powerful elected chief executive in the United States.

In the event of a vacancy in the governor's office, the state constitution specified that the president of the New Jersey State Senate, the upper chamber of the state legislature, would assume the role of acting governor without needing to resign from state senate. Further, if the acting governorship filled by the state senate president were vacated or that person could not assume the office, the governor would be succeeded by the speaker of the New Jersey General Assembly, the state legislature's lower chamber. This order of succession was included in the first state constitution in 1776, reinstated in the subsequent 1844 constitution, and kept in the 1947 Constitution until the 2006 amendment.

On several occasions in the state's history, proposals for a lieutenant governor were raised and rejected. Governor Alfred E. Driscoll backed a proposal to create the office in 1947 as the state was rewriting its constitution at a constitutional convention held at Rutgers University in New Brunswick. Driscoll's proposal was not approved.

In 1986, Governor Thomas Kean proposed the creation of the office in a move seen at the time as a political maneuver "apparently to preclude the possibility of a Democratic successor". At the time, Kean was seen as a potential candidate in the 1988 presidential or U.S. Senate candidate, and the state senate president was a Democrat. Kean's proposal was ultimately unsuccessful.

== Creation of the office (2001–present) ==
=== Resignations and succession controversies (2001–2006) ===
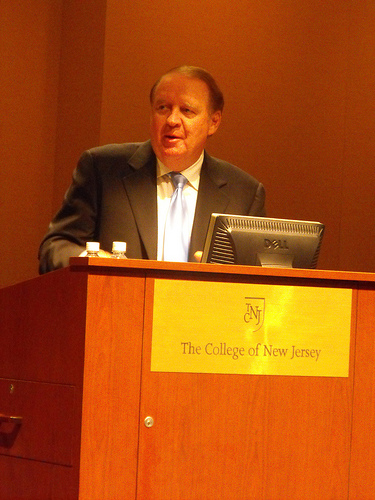
New Jersey State Senator Richard Codey served as the state's acting governor on two occasions, the first time for four days and the second for 14 months.

New Jersey experienced two periods during which several politicians assumed the governorship within the span of a few years. In 2001, Governor Christine Todd Whitman resigned after being appointed by George W. Bush to the position of administrator of the federal Environmental Protection Agency. Senate President Donald DiFrancesco became acting governor following Whitman's resignation on January 31, 2001, and remained in office until he retired from the state senate on January 8, 2002.

In an unusual political circumstance, the 2001 legislative elections returned a senate with equal numbers of Republicans and Democrats, with each party having 20 senators. Both sides negotiated to choose two senators from their respective parties to serve as co-presidents. Because of an 8-day gap between the seating of the new state legislature and the inauguration of Governor-elect Jim McGreevey, four men held the position of acting governor:

- Outgoing Senate President Donald DiFrancesco continued to serve until 12:00 noon on January 8, 2002, until the new senate session was convened.
- New Jersey's Attorney General John J. Farmer Jr. was acting governor for 90 minutes on January 8, 2002, while awaiting the swearing in of the next senate president.
- Senate co-President John O. Bennett, a Republican, served as acting governor from January 8–12, 2002.
- Senate co-President Richard Codey, a Democrat, served as acting governor from January 12, 2002, until McGreevey was sworn in as governor at noon on January 15, 2002.

After Governor Jim McGreevey resigned in the midst of a sex scandal in 2004, Richard Codey served again as acting governor from November 15, 2004. Codey was the only acting governor during this time, as the 2003 legislative elections had given the Democrats outright control of the state senate. Codey's tenure ended with the inauguration of Governor Jon Corzine on January 17, 2006.

Public attention was directed to the issue of succession in the wake of the resignations of Whitman and McGreevey during so brief a period. The response of the general public and the media was that the situation of acting governors and resignations made the situation untenable and that the state needed a permanent solution such as a lieutenant governor. There were three chief arguments in favor of establishing a lieutenant governor:

- That the senate president was chosen by the members of the state senate, not elected by voters—eligible to be acting governor solely by virtue of having been elected by the citizens in only one of the state's forty legislative districts.
- That an acting governor serving simultaneously in the executive branch and legislative branch would give the acting governor very broad powers and was a breach of the "separation of powers" between branches of the government.
- That there potentially would be a lack of continuity between political platforms from a governor of one party and a senate president of another who assumes the post as acting governor. As there was no guarantee the two individuals would be members of the same party, there was greater concern that the policies of the acting governor might be in direct conflict with those of the preceding governor.

=== Referendum on a constitutional amendment ===
In 2005, the state legislature passed resolutions for a proposed constitutional amendment to create the position of lieutenant governor. In accordance with the state constitution, this proposal was put before the voters as a public question on the ballot for the general election held on November 8, 2005. If passed by the voters, the proposal would take effect at the next gubernatorial election in 2009. The General Assembly considered legislation, designated as "Assembly Concurrent Resolution No. 100" (ACR100), which it passed on February 24, 2005, with 73 votes in favor and 1 opposed (Note: On ACR100, 5 assembly members did not vote and 1 member abstained.) The senate followed by approving the legislation, under the title "Senate Concurrent Resolution No. 2 (SCR2), with 32 votes in favor and 5 opposed (Note: On SCR2, 3 senate members did not vote.) on March 21, 2005. The senate was still run by acting governor Richard Codey as senate president.

The question proposed on the ballot read:

Shall the amendment of Articles II, IV, V and XI of the Constitution, agreed to by the Legislature, establishing the office of lieutenant governor, and providing for the term, election, succession, salary, qualifications, and duties of the office, and for an interim succession to be employed in the event of a vacancy in the office of the governor before the election of the first lieutenant governor, be adopted?

The amendment question was approved by voters by a tally of 836,134 votes (56.1%) to 655,333 (43.9%). In the interim period before the next election in 2009, any vacancy in the office of governor after January 17, 2006 would be filled first by the senate president, followed by the speaker of the general assembly, who would vacate their legislative seat upon assuming the governor's office.

Reflecting the procedure as outlined above, as Jon Corzine, Codey's successor as governor, attended the swearing in of Bob Menendez as a U.S. Senator on January 18, 2006, in Washington, D.C., Codey spent part of his first day as former (acting) governor as the acting governor of the state. Codey also served as acting governor once again between April 12 and May 7, 2007 as Corzine recovered from serious injuries suffered in a car accident.

In an extremely unusual event in December 2006, state transportation commissioner Kris Kolluri served as acting governor the day of December 28, 2006. As Governor Corzine, Codey the senate president, assembly speaker, and attorney general were all out of state, Kolluri became acting governor.

=== 2009 gubernatorial election ===
New Jersey elected its first lieutenant governor in 2009. After the primary election in June 2009, Governor Corzine signed into law A.3902, a bill from the state legislature that sought to clarify a vague passage in the state constitution concerning a gubernatorial candidate's selection of a running mate. Corzine signed the bill into law on June 25, 2009. The constitution provided that a gubernatorial candidate select a running mate within 30 days after the "nomination." Confusion arose over whether the nomination was the date of the primary election or the date that the vote count of that election was confirmed as final and certified by the state's Secretary of State. As defined by state law, the primary election is held on "Tuesday after the first Monday in June". However, the reported winner of a primary election is not official until the state's 21 county clerks are canvassed for official results after an election. This allows time for the Secretary of State to tabulate stray late absentee ballots, including military voters stationed outside the state, calculate final adjustments of vote tallies, litigate legal disputes, and conduct recounts if necessary. A.3902 provided a clarification of this deadline as "30 days after primary results are certified by the secretary of state, not the primary election itself." The bill also reduced the number of days in which the June primary election results must be certified from 86 days, which would place the deadline in August, to the fourth Friday in June, less than four weeks after the election. By enacting this bill, New Jersey's gubernatorial candidates had an extra three and a half weeks to announce their selection of a lieutenant governor running mate. The 2009 deadline for such an announcement was moved from July 2, 30 days after the primary election, to July 27, which is 30 days after the certification of election results.

In the week before the deadline, the three candidates nominated for governor and running in the November general election selected their running mates. The incumbent, Democratic nominee Governor Jon Corzine, chose State Senator Loretta Weinberg. His Republican challenger, Chris Christie, a former U.S. Attorney for New Jersey, selected Monmouth County Sheriff Kim Guadagno. Independent candidate Chris Daggett selected Frank J. Esposito, a history professor and former administrator at Kean University. On November 3, 2009, Christie defeated Corzine by a margin of 48.5% (1,174,445 votes) to 44.9% (1,087,731 votes), with 5.8% (139,579 votes) of the vote going to Daggett. With Christie's election as governor, Kim Guadagno was slated to become the state's first lieutenant governor in its modern form. Christie and Guadagno were installed at inaugural ceremonies held on January 19, 2010.

=== Subsequent elections ===
In the 2013 gubernatorial election, Guadagno was again chosen as lieutenant governor as Christie's running mate. The Christie-Guadagno ticket defeated Democratic candidates state Senator Barbara Buono (for governor) and labor union leader Milly Silva (for lieutenant governor). In 2017, after winning the Republican primary for governor, Guadagno chose Woodcliff Lake Mayor Carlos Rendo as her running mate. Phil Murphy, winner of the Democratic primary for governor, selected Assemblywoman Sheila Oliver for the second spot on his ticket. The Murphy-Oliver Democratic team ticket defeated the Guadagno-Rendo Republican ticket in the November general election.

Murphy and Oliver were re-elected on November 2, 2021, defeating the Republican ticket of former Assemblyman Jack Ciattarelli for governor and former State Senator Diane Allen for lieutenant governor.

The lieutenant governor position became vacant when Oliver died in office on August 1, 2023. Governor Murphy subsequently chose Secretary of State Tahesha Way to become lieutenant governor, and the appointment did not require confirmation, with Way also remaining Secretary of State.

== Constitutional provisions ==
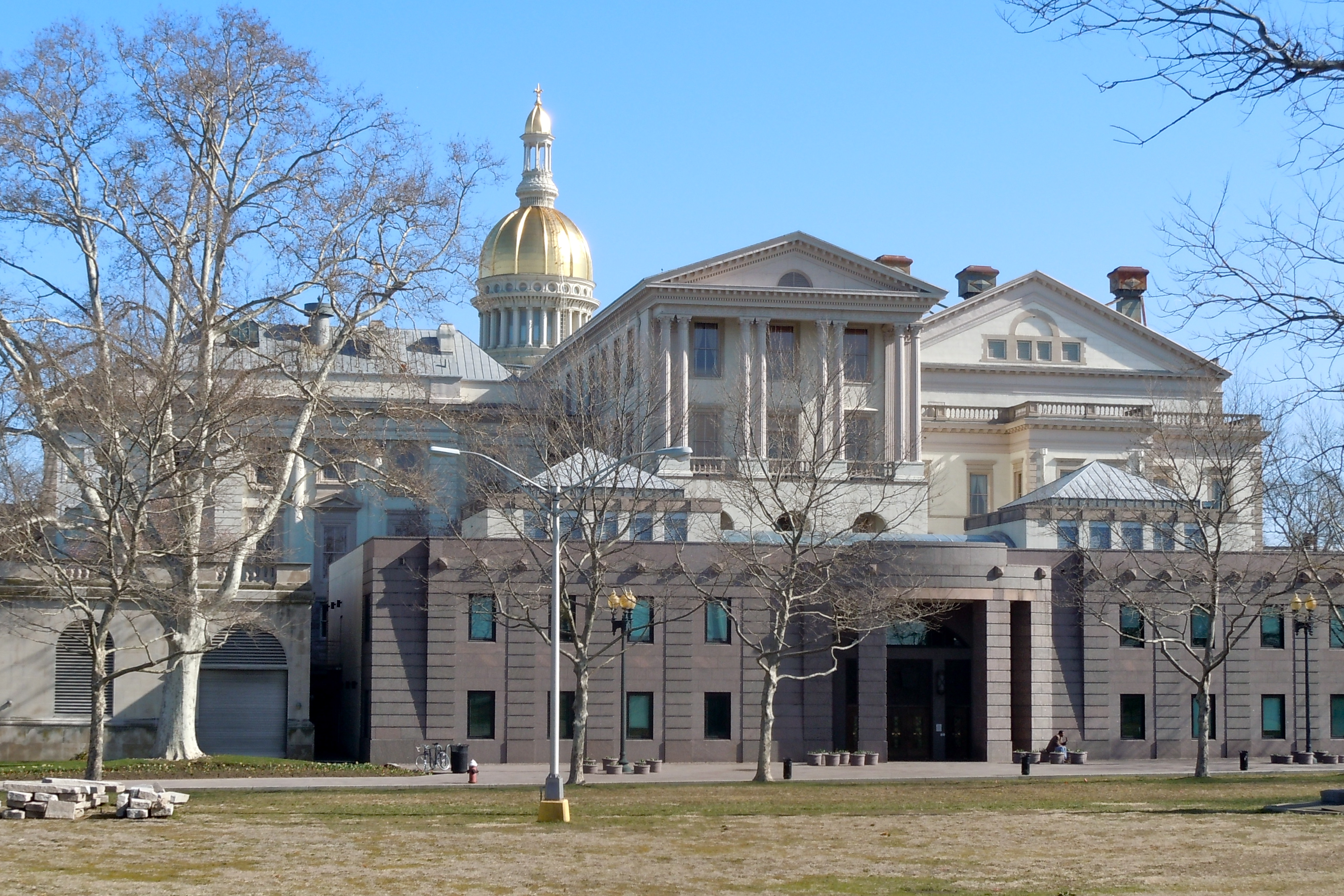
New Jersey's State House in Trenton, New Jersey, seen from the west

=== Qualifications and duties ===
As amended on January 17, 2006, New Jersey's state constitution mandates that a person may only be eligible for the position of lieutenant governor if they meet the eligibility qualifications to serve as governor. Article V, Section I, paragraph 2, requires that a candidate for governor (and thus lieutenant governor) be at least 30 years old, a citizen of the United States for at least 20 years, and a resident of New Jersey for at least seven years. Within 30 days after the certification of the statewide primary election, the candidate for governor selects a running mate to join the ticket as the candidate for lieutenant governor. The governor and lieutenant governor must be members of the same political party. As candidates they campaign on the same ticket, are elected conjointly, and serve the same four-year term concurrently.

Additional requirements are imposed by Article V, Section I, paragraph 10 of the state constitution, which provides that the lieutenant governor be appointed as a head of a cabinet-level department or administrative agency within the governor's administration, with the exception that lieutenant governor cannot be the state's attorney general.

=== Order of succession ===
The order of succession in the event the governor's office is left vacant is specified in Article V, Section I, paragraph 6 of the New Jersey State Constitution, as amended, effective January 17, 2006, which states:

In the event of a vacancy in the office of Governor resulting from the death, resignation or removal of a Governor in office, or the death of a Governor-elect, or from any other cause, the Lieutenant Governor shall become Governor, until a new Governor is elected and qualifies.

In the event of simultaneous vacancies in both the offices of Governor and Lieutenant Governor resulting from any cause, the President of the Senate shall become Governor until a new Governor or Lieutenant Governor is elected and qualifies. If there is a vacancy in the office of Senate President, or if the Senate President declines to become Governor, then the Speaker of the General Assembly shall become Governor until a new Governor or Lieutenant Governor is elected and qualifies. If there is a vacancy in the office of Speaker of the General Assembly, or if the Speaker declines to become Governor, then the functions, powers, duties and emoluments of the office shall devolve for the time being upon such officers and in the order of succession as may be provided by law, until a new Governor or Lieutenant Governor is elected and qualifies.

Article V, Section I, paragraph 8 of the State Constitution explains what happens if the position of Lieutenant Governor becomes vacant:

In the event of a vacancy in the office of Lieutenant Governor resulting from the death, resignation or removal of a Lieutenant Governor in office or the death of a Lieutenant Governor-elect or from any other cause, the Governor shall appoint a Lieutenant Governor within forty-five days of the occurrence of the vacancy to fill the unexpired term.

If a Lieutenant Governor becomes Governor, or in the event of simultaneous vacancies in the offices of Governor and Lieutenant Governor, a Governor and a Lieutenant Governor shall be elected to fill the unexpired terms of both offices at the next general election, unless the assumption of the office of Governor by the Lieutenant Governor, or the vacancies, as the case may be, occur within sixty days immediately preceding a general election, in which case they shall be elected at the second succeeding general election. No election to fill the unexpired terms shall be held in any year in which a Governor and Lieutenant Governor are to be elected for full terms. A Governor and Lieutenant Governor elected for unexpired terms shall assume their offices immediately upon their election.

== Appointments during the colonial period (1702–1776) ==
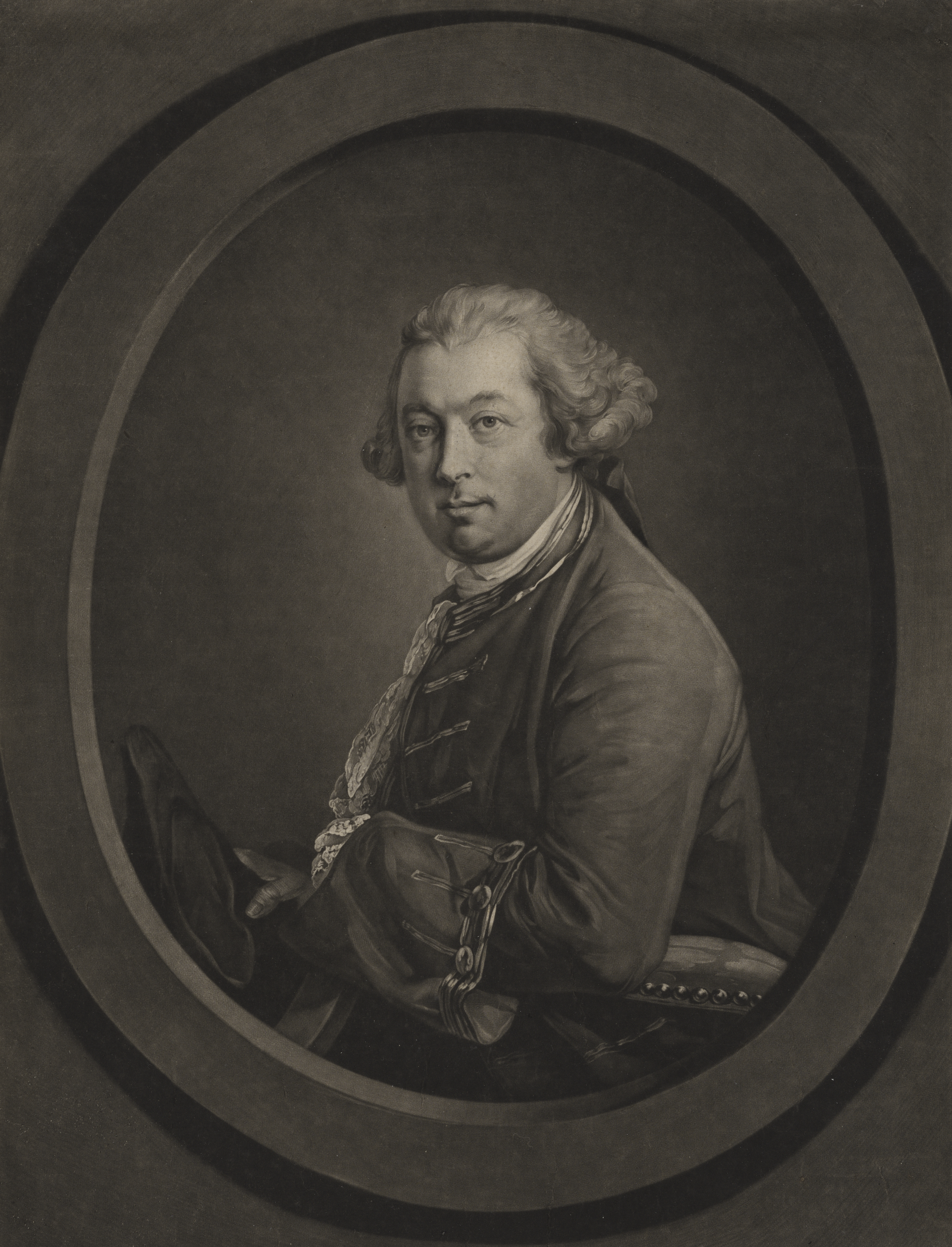
Thomas Pownall (1722–1805) was one of two men to serve as lieutenant governor of New Jersey (1755–1757) during the colonial period.

During the proprietary period (1664–1702), New Jersey was divided into two separate colonies, East Jersey and West Jersey. These were often administered in its first years by deputies who resided in North America and represented the province's governor and its major investors (the "proprietors"), who typically resided in London. In 1702, the proprietors of East and West Jersey surrendered their political authority to Queen Anne. The Queen united both provinces into one crown colony to be administered by a royal governor appointed by the Crown.

Only two individuals held the post of Lieutenant Governor of New Jersey during its colonial history. This position existed by direct commission from the British monarch only for two brief periods, 1702–09 and 1755–57. For most of the colonial period, in the event of the resignation, prolonged absence or death of the royal governor, the province would be administered by an "acting governor" who was the president of the Provincial Council (also called the "Governor's Council")—the upper house of the colonial legislature. The council presidency was an honorary ceremonial post given to the council's oldest member.

Richard Ingoldesby (d. 1719), a British army captain who was dispatched to New York to restore royal authority in New York after Leisler's Rebellion, was commissioned as the lieutenant governor of New Jersey and New York in November 1702. Ingoldesby served under the colony's first royal governor, Edward Hyde, Lord Cornbury and then his successor John Lovelace, 4th Baron Lovelace. Although Lord Cornbury was frequently absent from New Jersey and focused most of his efforts in New York, he refused to permit Ingoldesby any authority to govern. Ingoldesby became acting governor of both provinces briefly after the sudden death of Lord Lovelace on May 6, 1709. However, his authority was opposed by rival factions of the colony's proprietors who asserted that his commission was invalid. Ingoldesby further angered the colony's Quaker leaders after he retaliated against them for their opposition to raising troops from New Jersey to support a planned invasion of French colonies in Canada. His commission as governor was revoked in October 1709, but the news of his removal did not reach him until April 1710.

The second lieutenant governor, Thomas Pownall (1722–1805), was appointed to the post in 1755 under royal governor Jonathan Belcher (1681/2 (Note: In the Julian calendar, then in use in England, the year began on March 25. To avoid confusion with dates in the Gregorian calendar, then in use in other parts of Europe, dates between January and March were often written with both years. Dates in this article before 1752 are in the Julian calendar unless otherwise noted. See: Old Style and New Style dates)–1757). Pownall had little responsibility beyond anticipating the death of the aging governor who for most of his tenure was in declining health from a progressive paralytic disorder. Belcher lived longer than expected, and Pownall grew restless. In 1756, Pownall journeyed to England, where he was offered the governorship of Pennsylvania, which was retracted after he made demands for wide-ranging powers. While in England, Pownall advised the government organized by Thomas Pelham-Holles, 1st Duke of Newcastle, and his close foreign affairs advisor William Pitt on the state of affairs in the colonies during the Seven Years' War (called the French and Indian War in North America). Because the insights and first-hand knowledge he shared had impressed his superiors in Britain, Pownall was commissioned as Royal Governor of Massachusetts in March 1757. Pownall arrived in Boston to assume the new post on August 3, 1757. When Belcher died on August 31, 1757, Pownall did not assume the governorship of New Jersey. Pownall's appointment in Massachusetts left the New Jersey to be administered by John Reading (1686–1767) in his second tenure as "acting governor"—continuing the previous convention of the president of the Governor's Council assuming the governorship in an acting capacity. Reading assumed the post reluctantly, after first requesting unsuccessfully that Pownall return to New Jersey to assume the office.

From Ingoldesby's removal in 1710 until the tenure of Pownall, four appointed royal governors (John Montgomerie, Sir William Cosby, Lewis Morris, and Jonathan Belcher) died in office and were replaced with acting governors from the provincial council. Two of these acting governors (John Anderson and John Hamilton) died in office, and were replaced by another acting governor drawn from the members of the provincial council.

== List of lieutenant governors ==
=== Colonial period ===
Portrait	Lieutenant governor	In office	Appointed by	Royal governor
—	Richard Ingoldesby (d. 1719)	1702–1710	Queen Anne	Edward Hyde, Viscount Cornbury (1702–1708); John Lovelace, 4th Baron Lovelace (1708–1709); served as acting governor (1709–1710)
"portrait of Thomas Pownall, Lieutenant Governor of New Jersey from 1755 to 1757"	Thomas Pownall (1722–1805)	1755–1757	King George II	Jonathan Belcher (1747–1757)

=== Modern era (2010–present) ===
Democrat (4) Republican (1)

#	Picture	Lieutenant governor	Party	In office	Governor	Position in Cabinet
1	"portrait of Kim Guadagno, first Lieutenant Governor of New Jersey"	Kim Guadagno (b. 1959)	Republican	January 19, 2010 – January 16, 2018	Chris Christie	Secretary of State
2		Sheila Oliver (1952–2023)	Democratic	January 16, 2018 – August 1, 2023 (Note: Lieutenant Governor Sheila Oliver died in office on August 1, 2023.)	Phil Murphy	Commissioner of Community Affairs
Office vacant from August 1 – September 8, 2023					Phil Murphy	N/A
3		Tahesha Way (b. 1971 or 1972)	Democratic	September 8, 2023 – January 20, 2026	Phil Murphy	Secretary of State
4		Dale Caldwell (b. 1960)	Democratic	January 20, 2026 – September 25, 2026 (Note: Caldwell resigned after accusations of sexual harassment and ethics violations came to light.)	Mikie Sherrill	Secretary of State
Office vacant from September 25 – November 9, 2026					Mikie Sherrill	N/A
5		Shirley Emehelu	Democratic	November 9, 2026 – present	Mikie Sherrill	Secretary of State

== See also ==
- Government of New Jersey
- List of colonial governors of New Jersey
- List of governors of New Jersey
