= Dale Caldwell =

American politician (born 1960)

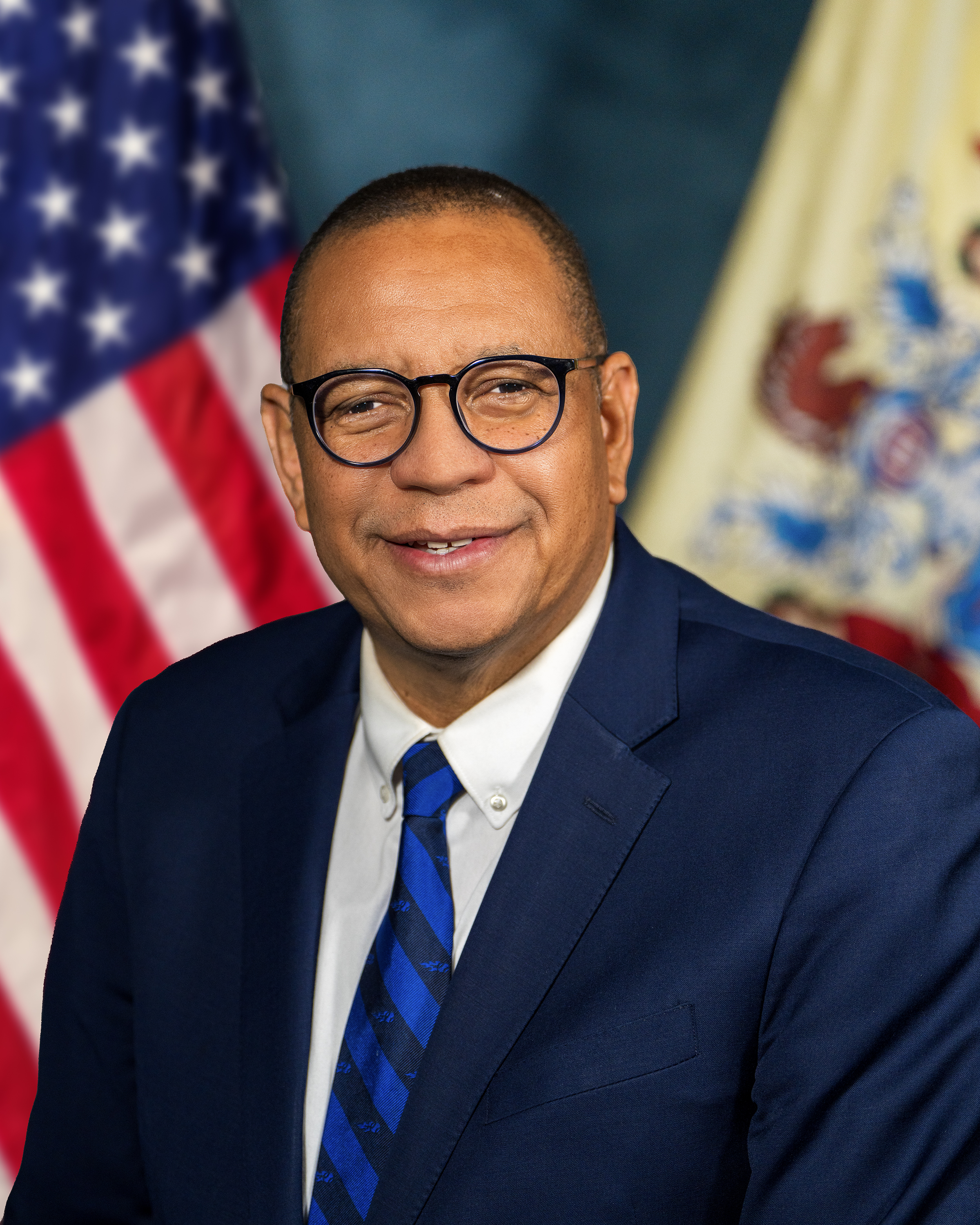
- Official portrait, 2026

4th Lieutenant Governor of New Jersey
- In office January 20, 2026 – September 25, 2026
- Governor: Mikie Sherrill
- Preceded by: Tahesha Way
- Succeeded by: Shirley Emehelu

35th Secretary of State of New Jersey
- In office January 20, 2026 – September 25, 2026
- Governor: Mikie Sherrill
- Preceded by: Tahesha Way
- Succeeded by: Shirley Emehelu

15th President of Centenary University
- In office July 1, 2023 – January 20, 2026
- Preceded by: Bruce Murphy
- Succeeded by: John Schol

Personal details
- Born: Dale Gilbert Caldwell; July 6, 1960 (age 66) Boston, Massachusetts, U.S.
- Party: Democratic
- Children: 1
- Education: Princeton University (BA); University of Pennsylvania (MBA); Seton Hall University (EdD)

Dale Gilbert Caldwell (born July 6, 1960) is an American academic administrator and author who served as the fourth lieutenant governor and 35th secretary of state of New Jersey from January to September 2026. A member of the Democratic Party, Caldwell was the first man to serve as the state's lieutenant governor, he is also currently the shortest serving lieutenant governor in New Jersey’s history. He previously served as president of Centenary University from 2023 to 2025, and was the university's first black president.

A former president of the Educational Services Commission of New Jersey (2001–2024), Caldwell was also the founding president of the College Achieve of Greater Asbury Park Charter School and served as a member of the New Brunswick Board of Education from 1998 to 2024. He is also the pastor of Covenant United Methodist Church in Plainfield, New Jersey. Following a report alleging that Caldwell had engaged in sexual harassment and ethics violations, Caldwell announced his resignation in September 2026.

== Early life and education ==
Caldwell was born on July 6, 1960, in Boston, Massachusetts. His parents, Gilbert and Grace Caldwell, met in Greensboro, North Carolina, where they were both attending college. His father, Rev. Dr. Gilbert Haven Caldwell, graduated from North Carolina A&T and became a United Methodist pastor who knew and marched with Martin Luther King Jr.

Caldwell is a 1978 graduate of the Hopkins School in New Haven, Connecticut. He earned his Bachelor in Arts in economics from Princeton University in 1982. Caldwell earned a Master of Business Administration in finance from the Wharton School of the University of Pennsylvania in 1988 and a Doctorate in Education Administration from Seton Hall University in 2017.

== Public sector career ==
After graduating from the Wharton School, Caldwell worked in the public sector health care practice of Deloitte Consulting from 1988 to 1999. He left Deloitte to become the founding executive director of the Newark Alliance, where he led the organization in enhancing education and economic development of New Jersey’s largest city. He left the Newark Alliance to serve as the assistant commissioner of the New Jersey Department of Community Affairs (DCA) for Governor Jim McGreevey’s administration from 2003 to 2005. He was later promoted to deputy commissioner and served as the chief operating officer of the department.

=== USTA ===
Caldwell became the first Black president and CEO of the United States Tennis Association (USTA) Eastern Section in 2006. The election was challenged by the losing candidate, Gerard E. Cuva, a white tennis instructor from Albany, who filed a lawsuit contending that the vote counting was improperly influenced. The lawsuit was ultimately rejected.

The newly installed USTA Eastern Section president suggested that the International Tennis Hall of Fame (ITHF) create an exhibit called “Breaking The Barriers” celebrating Black tennis history. Caldwell served as the co-curator of this exhibit with Arthur Carrington. It debuted at the 2007 US Open, where more than 26,000 spectators viewed the exhibit. The success of the exhibit inspired Caldwell to found the Black Tennis Hall of Fame in 2008 to celebrate players and contributors who were denied the right to participate in white only tennis tournaments and events.

As chair of the USTA Strategic Planning Committee, Caldwell created the New York Open, a professional tournament in Central Park. It was designed to help players rated 300 and below in the world earn extra income. The tournament ran from 2013 to 2019. In 2021, Caldwell was inducted into the Eastern Tennis Hall of Fame.

== Education career ==
Caldwell was first appointed to the New Brunswick Public Schools Board of Education in 1998 and served as President for a total of six years before he resigned in 2004. In 2009, he was selected as the New Jersey School Board Member of the Year by the New Jersey School Boards Association. During this time Caldwell also founded the consulting, training and coaching firm Strategic Influence.

Caldwell also served as a member of the Educational Services Commission of New Jersey Board of Directors from 1999 to 2024, and serves as President from 2001 to 2024. He has served as President of the Board of the College Achieve of Greater Asbury Park Charter School since 2017.

In 2013, the Village Charter School in Trenton, New Jersey, named Caldwell head of school. In 2015, he was named the Charter School Administrator of the Year from the New Jersey Charter School Association for his work leading the Village Charter School.

=== Fairleigh Dickinson University ===
Caldwell became the executive director of the Rothman Institute of Innovation and Entrepreneurship in the Silberman College of Business at Fairleigh Dickinson University in 2018. In this position, he led the expansion of the Veterans Launching Ventures program, the New Jersey Family Business of the Year Awards, and the Executive Coaching program.

=== Centenary University ===
Caldwell held this position until he became the 15th President of Centenary University in 2023. He served as President of Centenary University until his inauguration as Lieutenant Governor of New Jersey in 2026.

Caldwell is also a licensed local pastor in the United Methodist Church and has been the pastor of Covenant United Methodist Church in Plainfield since 2021.

== Lieutenant Governor and Secretary of State of New Jersey ==
=== 2025 gubernatorial election ===
On July 18, 2025, Caldwell was named by the New Jersey Globe as one of a number of candidates being considered by Democratic gubernatorial nominee Mikie Sherrill to be her running mate in New Jersey's 2025 gubernatorial election. On July 24, Sherrill selected Caldwell as her running mate, making him the Democratic candidate for lieutenant governor. Sherrill won, making Caldwell New Jersey’s first male lieutenant governor. He was also named chair of Sherrill's transition after her election.

On December 1, 2025, Sherrill announced that Caldwell would also serve as the secretary of state.

=== Allegations of inappropriate behavior ===
On September 4, 2026, the New Jersey Globe reported that Caldwell was under investigation by the governor's office for "alleged inappropriate behavior with women and possible ethics violations that include the purported offer of state jobs." The Globe also reported that Sherrill had appointed former New Jersey Attorney General Christopher Porrino to lead the investigation. The investigation's report included findings that substantiated allegations of sexual harassment by Caldwell.

On September 24, 2026, Governor Sherrill formally called for Caldwell to resign after investigations found he "engaged in serious, repeated violations of state policy and failed to uphold the responsibilities of his office". Sherrill gave Caldwell until September 25 to announce his resignation. The New Jersey Globe reported on September 25 that Caldwell would resign, which he did later that day.

== Personal life ==
As of 2025, Caldwell lives in New Brunswick, New Jersey. He has a daughter who is a student at Rutgers University.

== Awards and honors ==
- ROI-NJ 150 Most Influential C-Suite Executives in New Jersey (2023)
- NJBIZ NJ Power 50 - Ranked the 9th Most Influential Person in Higher Education (2023)
- Inducted into the Eastern Tennis Hall of Fame (2021)
- AARP New Jersey Andrus Award (2021)
- New Jersey Charter School Association Administrator of the Year Award (2015)
- USTA Eastern Section Leslie G. FitzGibbon Man of the Year Award (2014)
- International Tennis Hall of Fame Tennis Educational Merit Award (2010)
- New Jersey School Boards Association New Jersey School Board Member of the Year (2009)
- Fred Woodbridge Award given by the Princeton University Class of 1982 (1997)
- Hopkins School Distinguished Alumnus (2024)

== Bibliography ==
- Caldwell, Dale (2022). Intelligent Influence in Baseball. Absolutely Amazing eBooks. ISBN 978-1-955036-31-3.
- Caldwell, Dale (2022). Breaking The Barriers. Absolutely Amazing eBooks. ISBN 978-1-955036-09-2.
- Caldwell, Dale (2017). The Influence of Socioeconomic Factors on Student Achievement. Lambert Academic Publishing. ISBN 978-3-330-33104-4.
- Caldwell, Dale (2013). Fruit of the Spirit Hymnal and Calendar. Intelligent Influence Publishing Group. ISBN 978-0-9838963-8-8.
- Caldwell, Dale (2012). Intelligent Influence. Intelligent Influence Publishing Group. ISBN 978-0-9838963-0-2.
- Caldwell, Dale (2011). Tennis in New York. Intelligent Influence Publishing. ISBN 978-0-9838963-0-2.
- Caldwell, Dale (2008). School To Work To Success. Luminary Media Group. ISBN 978-1-930580-76-3.
- Caldwell, Dale (2004). Fruit of the Spirit Poems and Hymns. Ulyssian Publications. ISBN 978-1-930580-53-4.

Party political offices
Preceded by Sheila Oliver	Democratic nominee for Lieutenant Governor of New Jersey; 2025	Most recent
Political offices
Preceded by Tahesha Way	Lieutenant Governor of New Jersey; 2026	Succeeded by Shirley Emehelu
Preceded by Tahesha Way	Secretary of State of New Jersey; 2026	Succeeded by Shirley Emehelu
