= Shirley Emehelu =

American politician

- Official portrait, 2024

5th Lieutenant Governor of New Jersey
- Incumbent
- Assumed office November 9, 2026
- Governor: Mikie Sherrill
- Preceded by: Dale Caldwell

36th Secretary of State of New Jersey
- Incumbent
- Assumed office September 25, 2026; Acting: September 25, 2026 – November 9, 2026
- Governor: Mikie Sherrill
- Preceded by: Dale Caldwell

Personal details
- Born: Shirley Uchenna Udekwu; 1978 or 1979 (age 47–48) Nigeria
- Party: Democratic
- Spouse: Ikenna Emehelu (m. 2005)
- Education: Yale University (BA, JD)

Shirley Uchenna Emehelu (née Udekwu; born 1978/1979) is an American attorney and politician currently serving as the 5th lieutenant governor and 36th secretary of State of New Jersey since November 9, 2026. She was sworn in to both offices after being appointed by Governor Mikie Sherrill to replace Dale Caldwell, who resigned in September. Emehelu served as acting Secretary of State in the interim. She holds both offices concurrently, as did Caldwell.

== Early life and education ==
Emehelu was born Shirley Uchenna Udekwu in Nigeria and emigrated to the United States at age three. Both of her parents were physicians. She initially lived in Chicago and then moved to Pittsburgh.

Emehelu received her Bachelors of Arts from Yale University and her Juris Doctor degree from Yale Law School.

== Career ==
From 2010 to 2019, Emehelu was an Assistant U.S. Attorney. Sherrill and Emehelu worked together as federal prosecutors and knew each other as residents of Montclair, New Jersey, and as parents of children in the local public schools. Emehelu joined state government in 2022 as executive assistant attorney general, the third-highest-ranking official in the New Jersey Attorney General’s Office, during Governor Phil Murphy’s second term. She was named to the post by Attorney General Matt Platkin.

Emehelu joined the Sherrill administration in January 2026, first as acting state comptroller and then as acting Secretary of State in September.

On November 9, 2026, Sherrill named Emehelu the lieutenant governor of New Jersey.

== Personal life ==
Emehelu married attorney Ikenna Emehelu in April, 2005.

Political offices
Preceded by Dale Caldwell	Secretary of State of New Jersey; 2026–present	Incumbent
Preceded by Dale Caldwell	Lieutenant Governor of New Jersey; 2026–present	Incumbent
