= New Jersey State Council on the Arts =

Cultural organization in New Jersey, USA

Coordinates: 40.2218°N 74.7741°W

Agency overview
- Formed: 1966
- Jurisdiction: New Jersey
- Headquarters: 225 West State Street, 4th floor, Trenton, New Jersey 08608
- Agency executives: Elizabeth A. Mattson, Chair; Nicholas Paleologos, Executive Director
- Parent agency: New Jersey Department of State
- Website: nj.gov/state/njsca/

The New Jersey State Council on the Arts was founded in 1966 to support artistic activities in the state of New Jersey. It is funded by the New Jersey State Legislature and the National Endowment for the Arts (NEA).
