= New Jersey State Museum =

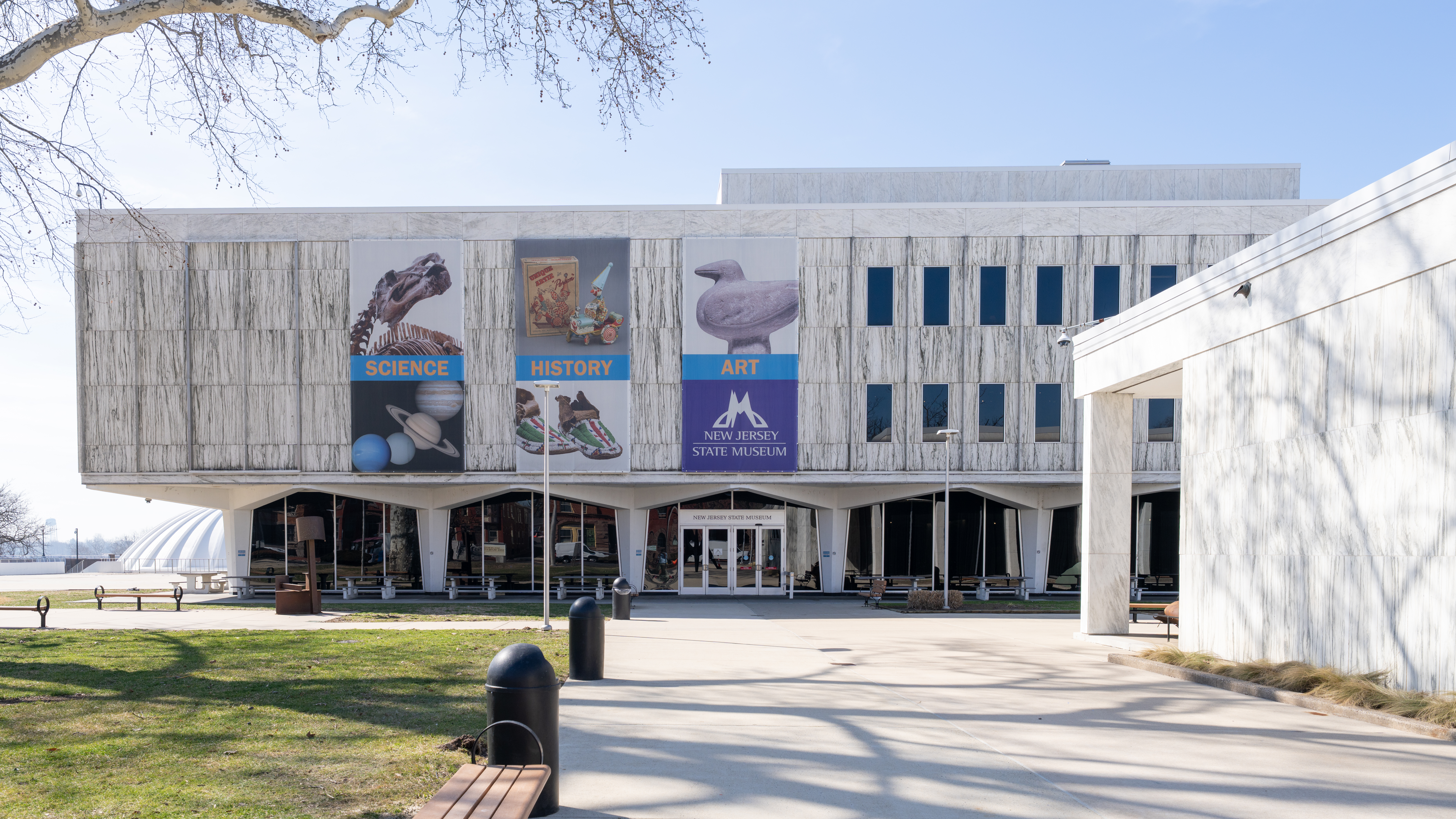

- Location of the museum in New Jersey
- Established: 1895
- Location: Trenton, New Jersey
- Coordinates: 40.216944°N 74.743333°W
- Type: State museum of New Jersey
- Collection size: 2+ million objects
- Directors: Margaret M. O'Reilly, Executive Director
- Website: www.nj.gov/state/museum/

The New Jersey State Museum is located at 195-205 West State Street in Trenton, in the U.S. state of New Jersey. The museum's collections include natural history specimens, archaeological and ethnographic artifacts, and cultural history and fine art objects. Exhibitions, educational activities, research programs, and lectures are also offered. The museum, a division of the New Jersey Department of State, includes a 140-seat planetarium and a 384-seat auditorium.

The New Jersey State Museum received initial accreditation in 1974 from the American Alliance of Museums (AAM) and has maintained its status since that time, with its accreditation renewed in 2019. The museum is one of nine in the state to be accredited by the AAM.

== History ==
The New Jersey State Museum was the first state museum in the country to be established with a specific focus on educating the public and is one of the oldest state museums in the nation. The New Jersey Legislature formally established the museum by law in 1895, and the museum was housed in the New Jersey State House. The museum is a division of the New Jersey Department of State.

In its beginning, the museum focused on natural history. The first major collections were of rocks, minerals, and fossils from the New Jersey Geological Survey, which began in 1836. In 1912, the museum expanded its focus to include archaeology through the acquisition of artifacts produced by Native Americans in the region. These artifacts dated from the prehistoric and historic periods as well as from New Jersey's populations during the Colonial and post-colonial eras. In 1922, the museum was one of the first on the east coast to exhibit, as art, a collection of objects from Native Americans of North America. With the acquisition of these objects, the museum started its ethnographic collections. In 1924, decorative arts were added to the museum with examples from the Trenton-area ceramics industry. In 1929, the museum moved into a larger space in the newly constructed State House Annex. While fine art had been exhibited and acquired through the mid-20th century, the museum began a greater emphasis in the early 1960s on acquiring paintings, sculpture and works on paper.

In 1964, the museum moved from the State House Annex into facilities created specifically for it within the newly created Capitol Cultural Complex. The museum's main building consists of four floors of exhibition, program, laboratory, and research space, a planetarium, and a museum gift shop. An adjacent building contains an auditorium, as well as additional gallery spaces.

== Bureau of Archaeology/Ethnography ==
The Bureau of Archaeology/Ethnography collections encompass approximately 2.4 million prehistoric and historic specimens acquired by 100 years of excavation, as well as almost 4,000 ethnographic objects acquired through gifts to the museum.

The ethnographic collection consists of specimens that represent the Lenape and other North American indigenous groups.

== Bureau of Cultural History ==
The Bureau of Cultural History collection includes over 13,000 artifacts documenting New Jersey's cultural, economic, military, political, and social history, as well as aspects of its decorative arts. The Cultural History Bureau also oversees the preservation and interpretation of the New Jersey State Capitol's collection of military flags used by New Jersey regiments in the Civil War and World War I.

== Bureau of Fine Art ==
The State Museum has collected over 12,000 works of art including paintings, prints, drawings, sculpture, and photographs.

The collection has an American focus that highlights the work of New Jersey artists within the context of American art history. Also included are works that depict New Jersey scenes and events. The strengths of the Fine Art collection lie in works by the American modernists associated with Alfred Stieglitz, American abstract artists of the 1930s and 1940s, a comprehensive collection of works by 19th through 21st-century African-American artists, contemporary American and New Jersey art, the complete graphic outputs of Ben Shahn and Jacob Landau and print and paper work by the New Jersey Fellows associated with the Brodsky Center. The Fine Art History Bureau also has curatorial responsibility for the State House Portrait Collection which includes portraits of New Jersey's governors, jurists, and other state officials.

== Bureau of Natural History ==
The Bureau of Natural History holds a collection of about 250,000 specimens, including industrial minerals and ores, paleontological specimens (fossils), osteological specimens (bones), modern shells, and a systematic study skin component. Sub-collections include pinned insects, fluid-preserved fauna, taxidermy mounts, and glass lantern slides. The bureau is also the repository for about 300 types of specimens of Paleozoic and Mesozoic fossils, as well as fossils documenting the Paleozoic strata within the Delaware Water Gap National Recreation Area. Minerals from the zinc-mining locality of Franklin-Sterling Hill are represented, including the largest number of fluorescent mineral species in the world, as are mine-specific specimens from New Jersey's industrial iron mining history. Specimens from beyond New Jersey are used for comparative purposes in exhibitions and educational programming.

== Bureau of Education and Public Programs ==
The museum's Bureau of Education offers programs and events. School groups attend museum-based classes, workshops, exhibition tours, and planetarium programs, as well as access classroom resources such as curriculum guides.

Since its opening in 1964, the State Museum's planetarium has been a large part of the museum's public programming. The planetarium is equipped with "Full Dome" video technology. Exhibits include displays of constellations, Solar System models, and space exploration experiences. The planetarium presents public shows on weekends, during school vacation periods (spring and winter), and during the summer.

== See also ==
- New Jersey State Library
