= Frank Lautenberg =

American politician (1924–2013)

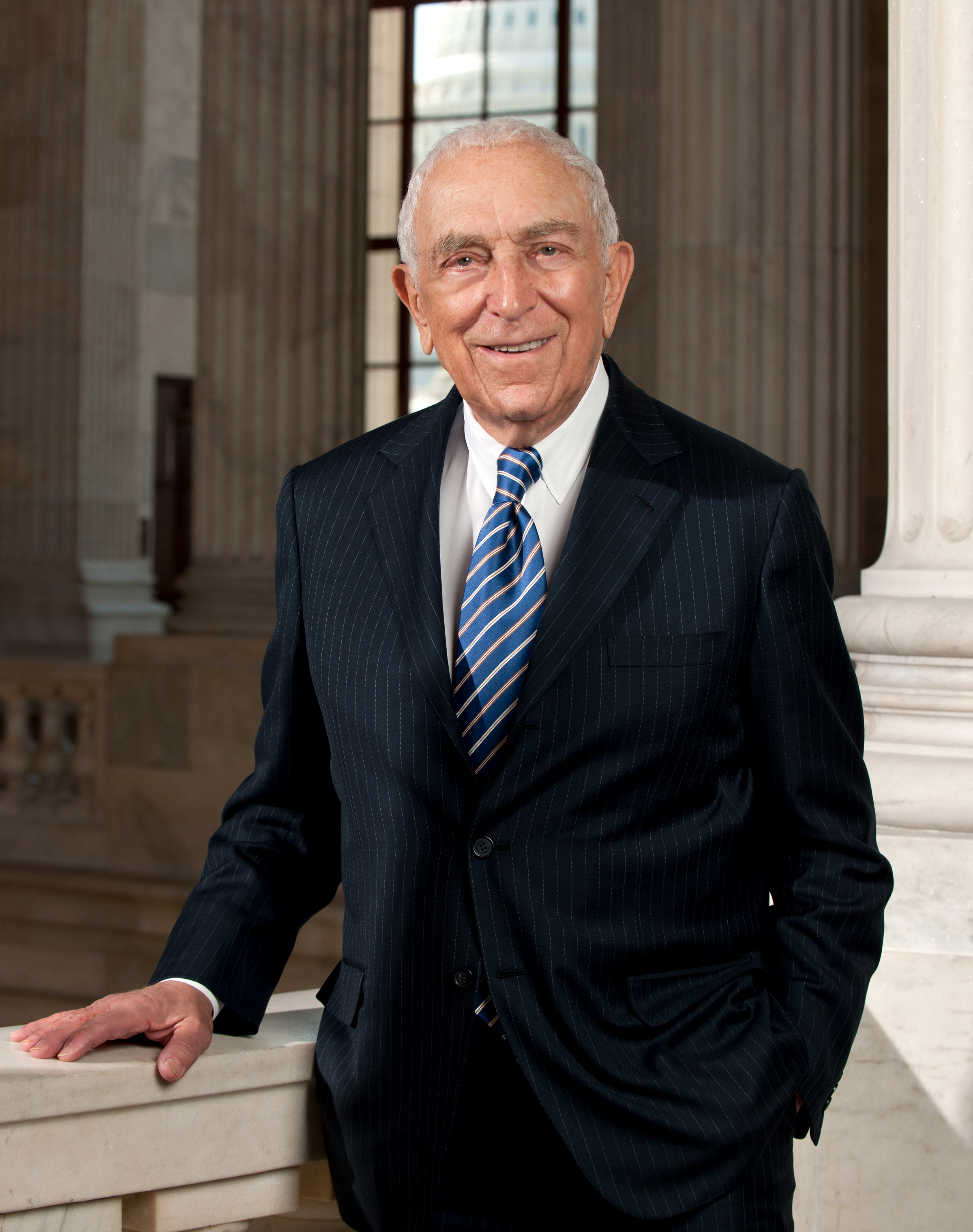
- Official portrait, 2011

United States Senator from New Jersey
- In office January 3, 2003 – June 3, 2013
- Preceded by: Robert Torricelli
- Succeeded by: Jeffrey Chiesa
- In office December 27, 1982 – January 3, 2001
- Preceded by: Nicholas F. Brady
- Succeeded by: Jon Corzine

Personal details
- Born: Frank Raleigh Lautenberg; January 23, 1924 Paterson, New Jersey, U.S.
- Died: June 3, 2013 (aged 89) New York City, New York, U.S.
- Resting place: Arlington National Cemetery
- Party: Democratic
- Spouses: Lois Levenson (m. 1956; div. 1988) Bonnie Englebardt (m. 2004)
- Children: 4
- Education: Columbia University (BS)

Military service
- Branch: United States Army
- Service years: 1942–1946
- Rank: Technician Fifth Grade
- Unit: Army Signal Corps
- Conflict: World War II
- Frank Lautenberg's voice Frank Lautenberg on his opposition to the National Highway Designation Act of 1995; Recorded June 22, 1995

Frank Raleigh Lautenberg (/ˈlɔːtənbɜːrɡ/; January 23, 1924 – June 3, 2013) was an American businessman and Democratic Party politician who served as United States Senator from New Jersey from 1982 to 2001, and again from 2003 until his death in 2013. He was originally from Paterson, New Jersey.

Lautenberg was elected to five terms as Senator. He first took office in December 1982 and served three terms, retiring from the Senate in 2001. Called upon to run again one year later due to circumstances surrounding his Senate colleague Robert Torricelli's re-election campaign, Lautenberg returned to the Senate in January 2003 and was elected to one additional term in 2008. He died during his fifth term and remains New Jersey's longest serving senator, with a total of 28 years, five months, and eight days in office.

Before entering politics, he was an early partner in, and became the chairman and chief executive officer of Automatic Data Processing, Inc. In his early years, he served overseas in the U.S. Army Signal Corps from 1942 to 1946 as a part of the war effort, and after returning home his interest in American political events increased. He has been called "the last of the New Deal liberals" and was known for his legislative efforts against drunk driving, and his support of spending for Amtrak and urban public transportation, for stronger environmental regulations, greater consumer protections, and investigations of wrongdoing by Wall Street.

== Early life and career ==
Lautenberg was born in Paterson, New Jersey, the son of Mollie (née Bergen) and Sam Lautenberg, Jewish immigrants from Poland and Russia, who had arrived in the United States as infants. He was named after his maternal grandfather, Frank Bergen, and close family friend and Paterson community activist, Raleigh Weintrob.

When Lautenberg was 19, his father, who worked in silk mills, sold coal, farmed, and once ran a tavern, died of cancer. His mother then opened a sandwich shop to support the family.

After graduating from Nutley High School in 1941, Lautenberg served overseas in the 3185th Signal Battalion of the United States Army Signal Corps during World War II from 1942 to 1946. Then, financed by the GI Bill, he attended and graduated from Columbia Business School's now-defunct undergraduate program in 1949 with a degree in economics.

He worked as a salesman for Prudential Insurance and was the first salesman at Automatic Data Processing (ADP), a payroll-management company. He became the company's CEO in 1975.

He was the executive commissioner of the Port Authority of New York and New Jersey from 1978 to 1982.

Lautenberg also served in roles with a number of Jewish and pro-Israel organizations, including as a member of the Jewish Agency for Israel's board of governors and as president of the American Friends of the Hebrew University. In 1974, he became the youngest chair ever in the history of the United Jewish Appeal. Within a year Lautenberg had increased its charitable intake to the second-highest level in its history. He was also named to the President's Commission on the Holocaust in the late 1970s.

== U.S. Senator ==
=== Early years ===
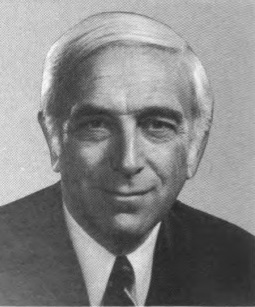
Lautenberg first served in the U.S. Senate in 1982.

Lautenberg contributed to Democratic candidates for years. He donated $90,000 to George McGovern's campaign for president in 1972, earning himself a place on one of Richard Nixon's enemies lists. In 1982, he ran for the Democratic nomination for the U.S. Senate. He faced nine other candidates: former State Banking Commissioner Angelo Bianchi, former Morristown Mayor Donald Cresitello, former Congressman Joseph A. LeFante, labor leader Frank Forst, former Congressman Andrew Maguire, Richard McAleer, businessman Howard Rosen, Princeton Mayor Barbara Boggs Sigmund, and Passaic County Freeholder Cyril Yannarelli. Maguire was the favorite but Boggs' entry took votes away from him and Lautenberg spent a considerable amount of his own money. Lautenberg won with a plurality, taking 26% of the vote to Maguire's 23%, LeFante's 20% and Sigmund's 11%.

The seat had been occupied by Democrat Harrison A. Williams, who resigned on March 11, 1982, after being implicated in the Abscam scandal. After Williams' resignation, Republican Governor Thomas Kean appointed Republican Nicholas F. Brady to the seat. Brady served in the Senate through the primary and general elections but did not run for the seat himself. In the general election, Lautenberg faced popular Republican congresswoman Millicent Fenwick. She ran on a very progressive platform and polls in the Summer of 1982 put her ahead by 18 points. Even Lautenberg quipped that she was "the most popular candidate in the country." Lautenberg spent more of his own money, eventually out-spending Fenwick two-to-one. He emphasised President Reagan's unpopularity, reminded the voters that she would be a vote for a Republican majority in the Senate and called Fenwick, who was 72, "eccentric" and "erratic" but denied that he was referring to her age. He did however point out that she would be almost 80 at the end of her first term and was therefore unlikely to gain much seniority in the Senate. Lautenberg won by 51% to 48%, in what was considered a major upset. Brady, who had just a few days left in his appointed term, resigned on December 27, 1982, allowing Lautenberg to take office several days before the traditional swearing-in of senators, which gave him an edge in seniority over the other freshman senators.

In his first term, Lautenberg pushed the National Minimum Drinking Age Act, which was passed in 1984. The same year, he spoke at the Democratic National Convention, though he was overshadowed by New York Governor Mario Cuomo, who gave the keynote speech.

In his 1988 race, Lautenberg was opposed by Republican Wall Street executive, former college football star Brigadier General Pete Dawkins, who won the 1958 Heisman Trophy for the Army Black Knights. After trailing in early polls, the Lautenberg campaign, headed by Democratic consultant James Carville, ran an aggressive advertising campaign enumerating Lautenberg's legislative accomplishments and raising the possibility that Dawkins' candidacy was intended solely as a stepping stone to the presidency, as well as pointing out his lack of roots in New Jersey. Lautenberg ultimately came from behind to win re-election, 54% to 46%. The race was named the 17th-nastiest in American political history by political scientist Kerwin Swint in his book Mudslingers: The 25 Dirtiest Political Campaigns of All Time.

Following his re-election, Lautenberg became a member of the President's Commission on Aviation Security and Terrorism (PCAST), which was set up in September 1989 to review and report on aviation security policy in light of the sabotage of Pan Am Flight 103 on December 21, 1988.

After Boris Perchatkin’s speeches in the US Congress in 1989 along with Representative Bruce Morrison, Lautenberg was a primary sponsor of what became known as the Lautenberg Amendment, which first passed in 1989. The amendment granted presumptive refugee status to Jewish people and members of other groups from the Soviet Union, and facilitated the emigration of hundreds of thousands of Jews to the United States.

Lautenberg was re-elected in the 1994 Republican Revolution, defeating New Jersey State Assembly Speaker Chuck Haytaian by 50% to 47%.

In 1999, two popular Republicans were considering running against Lautenberg: the incumbent Governor Christine Todd Whitman and former Governor Thomas Kean. Polling showed Lautenberg trailing both of them. Lautenberg also did not get along with his New Jersey Senate colleague Robert Torricelli, and suspected that he was encouraging Whitman to run against him. Torricelli's relationship with Lautenberg had been very rocky, especially when Lautenberg directly accused Torricelli of encouraging Whitman to challenge him for his Senate seat. Lautenberg raised his concerns in a meeting with Democratic senators in 1999, and Torricelli responded by shouting, "You're a fucking piece of shit, and I'm going to cut your balls off!" Lautenberg was also less than enthusiastic at the prospect of fundraising for a grueling campaign, and did not want to have to spend more of his own money.

He announced his retirement in 2000, but denied it was because he thought he would lose to Whitman or Kean, saying that he had been vulnerable in previous elections, and, "Mr. Vulnerable always wins." His fellow Democrat and businessman, Jon Corzine, was elected to replace him.

=== 2002 election ===
Almost immediately, Lautenberg regretted his decision, especially after neither Whitman nor Kean ran against Corzine in the general election (instead, Congressman Bob Franks ran for the seat, and was defeated). He also was said to be missing his days working in the Senate. He had considered reversing his decision and running for re-election, but since his rival, Senator Torricelli, had encouraged Corzine to run in the first place, Lautenberg would likely have had trouble restarting his campaign. A little over a year after he left office, however, Lautenberg found an opening.

In the 2002 primaries leading up to the midterm elections. Torricelli won the Democratic nomination for a second term in the Senate. The Republican candidate was Doug Forrester, the mayor of West Windsor Township. It was expected that Torricelli would win the election by a significant margin, as no Republican had won election from New Jersey since Clifford P. Case was elected to his final six-year term in 1972 in the seat Torricelli was currently occupying. However, an ongoing investigation into the Senator's activities and business dealings resulted in federal corruption charges being filed against him before the election. The subsequent drop in voter support in the weeks that followed resulted in Torricelli's decision to withdraw from the race on September 30, 2002.

After overtures were made to retired Senator Bill Bradley, Congressman Frank Pallone, and future Senator Robert Menendez to take over as candidate, the New Jersey Democratic Party called upon Lautenberg and he accepted the nomination. This was met with an almost immediate challenge by Forrester and the Republicans as New Jersey law forbade the replacement of candidates on the ballot after a certain deadline. The ballot name change was unanimously upheld by the New Jersey Supreme Court, who cited that the law, as written, did not consider the possibility for an emergency resignation and said that Forrester would have an unfair advantage if Torricelli was left on the ballot. The U.S. Supreme Court declined to take up the case. With the popular Lautenberg now in the race, Forrester's lead in the polls evaporated and Lautenberg won the election by a 54% to 44% margin.

=== Back in the Senate ===
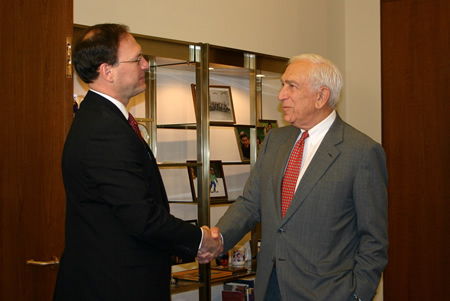
Lautenberg meets with Associate Justice nominee Samuel Alito prior to his confirmation hearings. Lautenberg eventually voted against the nominee.

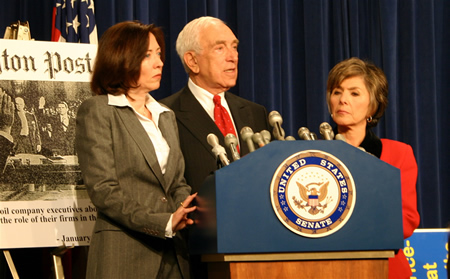
Lautenberg with Barbara Boxer (right) and Maria Cantwell (left) at a news conference discussing whether oil executives lied during a congressional testimony regarding price gouging.

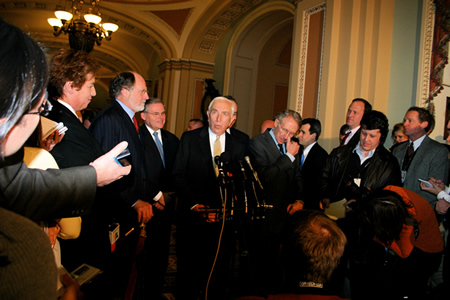
Lautenberg (center) is joined by Sen. Harry Reid (right) and outgoing Senator Jon Corzine (second to left, with red tie) to welcome the new Senator Bob Menendez (between Corzine and Lautenberg) on Capitol Hill

Despite having served over 18 years in the Senate, upon Lautenberg's return he was treated like other freshman senators with respect to seniority. This was despite the fact that he had agreed to run for office with the implicit understanding that Democratic leader Tom Daschle would allow him to retain seniority and serve on the Appropriations Committee. He was reported to have been upset with his treatment and commented that "when you come down from a relatively lofty position of seniority, the atmosphere is different", having been given one of the least prestigious office spaces behind a fire exit door.

Back in the Senate, Lautenberg was once again considered one of the chamber's most liberal members. He was pro-choice, supported gun control, introduced many bills increasing penalties for carjacking and car theft, and criticized the Bush administration on national security issues. He was heavily involved in various anti-smoking and airline safety legislation. He also co-sponsored legislation to increase drunk driving penalties. He was probably best known as the author of the legislation that banned smoking from most commercial airline flights. He also is known for authoring the Ryan White Care Act, which provides services to AIDS patients. Upon his return to the Senate, Lautenberg was the first U.S. senator to introduce legislation calling for homeland security funds to be distributed solely on the basis of risk and vulnerability.

In 2005, he became a leading voice within the Senate in calling for an investigation into the Bush administration payment of columnists.

When Jon Corzine resigned from the Senate to become Governor of New Jersey, Lautenberg became the senior senator again in 2006. This also made him the only person to have been both the junior and senior senator from New Jersey twice each. Lautenberg received an "A" on the Drum Major Institute's 2005 Congressional Scorecard on middle-class issues.

In 2007, Lautenberg proposed the Denying Firearms and Explosives to Dangerous Terrorists Act of 2007, designed to deny weapons purchases by persons that the government has placed on the terrorist watchlist. On June 21, 2007, Lautenberg passed Clifford Case for the most votes on the Senate floor of any United States Senator in New Jersey history.

=== 2008 election ===
In February 2006, Lautenberg announced his intention to run for re-election in 2008, saying that deciding not to run for re-election in 2000 "was among the worst decisions of his life." Lautenberg formally announced his candidacy on March 31, 2008. His campaign manager was Brendan W. Gill.

Congressman Steve Rothman and State Senator John Adler both mooted the possibility of running, but said they would defer to Lautenberg. In private he called them "the pallbearers". Ultimately, both declined to run. Instead, Congressman Rob Andrews announced he would challenge Lautenberg for renomination in the Democratic primary. Also running was Morristown Mayor Donald Cresitello, who had run against Lautenberg in the 1982 Senate primary. Andrews ran a poor campaign, "best remembered—if it's remembered at all—for its ineptness." He was also tarred with his vote for the Iraq War. Lautenberg's New Jersey Senate colleague Bob Menendez also came to his aid and Lautenberg defeated Andrews 59% to 35% in the June 3 primary. He then defeated former Congressman Dick Zimmer in the general election 56% to 42%.

The New York Times editorial board endorsed Mr. Lautenberg's Senate candidacy during the 2008 cycle.

Both opponents cited Lautenberg's age among reasons to vote against him. Andrews, for example, referenced Lautenberg's own 1982 defeat of Millicent Fenwick, in which Lautenberg was alleged to have referred to Fenwick's age (Fenwick was 72 at the time; Lautenberg was 84 in 2008). Lautenberg denied he made Fenwick's age an issue, saying he only ever questioned Fenwick's "ability to do the job."

=== Final years ===
In June 2010, Lautenberg compared the devil with Dubai. Lautenberg was quoted as stating, "We wouldn't transfer the title to the devil, and we're not going to transfer it to Dubai." According to a Foreign Policy in Focus article, Lautenberg defended his remarks due to the UAE's refusal to support U.S. policy toward Israel and Iran. According to the Arab American Institute, Lautenberg apologized in a letter upon meeting with Arab American Institute representatives.

On February 14, 2013, Lautenberg announced he would not seek re-election. In the press conference, Lautenberg joked "Is it too late to change my mind?" and joked that he would pray "something goes wrong" so he could be called on to run again.

At the time of his death from viral pneumonia at age 89, Lautenberg was the oldest serving senator and the last remaining World War II veteran in the Senate.

=== Committee assignments ===
Lautenberg served on the following committees:

- Committee on Appropriations
  - Subcommittee on Commerce, Justice, Science, and Related Agencies
  - Subcommittee on Energy and Water Development
  - Subcommittee on Financial Services and General Government
  - Subcommittee on Homeland Security (Vice chairman)
  - Subcommittee on State, Foreign Operations, and Related Programs
  - Subcommittee on Transportation, Housing and Urban Development, and Related Agencies
- Committee on Commerce, Science, and Transportation
  - Subcommittee on Aviation Operations, Safety, and Security
  - Subcommittee on Consumer Affairs, Insurance, and Automotive Safety
  - Subcommittee on Oceans, Atmosphere, Fisheries, and Coast Guard
  - Subcommittee on Surface Transportation and Merchant Marine Infrastructure, Safety and Security (Chairman)
- Committee on Environment and Public Works
  - Subcommittee on Superfund, Toxics and Environmental Health (Chairman)
  - Subcommittee on Transportation and Infrastructure
  - Subcommittee on Water and Wildlife

== Political positions and votes ==
- Agriculture – In 2007, Lautenberg voted for an amendment to the 2007 farm bill which would have limited the amount of subsidies that a married couple could receive to $250,000; the amendment failed. However, he voted against eliminating farm price supports and eventually voted for the 2007 farm bill as well. He supported increasing the minimum wage.
- Civil liberties – Lautenberg was not in the Senate at the time of the original Patriot Act in 2001; when the 2005 re-authorization came to the Senate floor, Lautenberg voted against cloture, but voted in favor of accepting the conference report. In March 2011, he stated to an assembled group of constituents that Tea Party Republicans "don't deserve the freedoms that are in the Constitution ... but we'll give them to them anyway".
- Environment and energy – Lautenberg, who had a pro-environment voting record, wrote a bill in 1986 that established the Toxics Release Inventory, which required companies to disclose the chemicals they released into the environment. He also co-sponsored the Consumer First Energy Act of 2008, which would have repealed $17 billion in tax breaks for oil companies and re-invested the $17 billion in renewable energy development and energy efficiency technology. However, the Senate rejected a cloture motion on the bill in June 2008. One of his main priorities in his final term was a bill he authored with Republican Senator David Vitter that would overhaul chemical safety laws. Lautenberg favored alternative energy sources, and voted in favor of giving tax incentives to those who use them.
- Foreign policy – In 1996, Lautenberg voted against a bill that eliminated the United States Arms Control and Disarmament Agency, the United States Information Agency, the Agency for International Development, and the International Development Cooperation Agency and allowed the President to withhold 20% of funds appropriated to the United Nations if any agency of the organization does not implement consensus-based decision-making procedures on budgetary matters that assure that significant attention is given to the specific interests of the United States. He opposed capping foreign aid, and voted to give billions of dollars to the International Monetary Fund. He voted against implementing both the North American Free Trade Agreement and the Central American Free Trade Agreement. He called for action to be taken at the World Trade Organization against members of the OPEC cartel which sets production quotas that raise prices for crude oil, and consequently, America's gasoline. Lautenberg was an opponent of the Iraq War, though he was not in office when it was voted on.
- Gun control – Lautenberg was a consistent supporter of gun control. He sponsored the Domestic Violence Offender Gun Ban, more commonly known as the "Lautenberg Amendment". This piece of legislation prohibits individuals (including law enforcement officers and military service members), convicted of a state or federal misdemeanor involving the use or attempted use of physical force, or the threatened use of a deadly weapon, among family members, from possessing a firearm. One of his last speeches on the Senate floor was in support of a failed bi-partisan measure for increased gun control.
- Homeland security – Lautenberg was a proponent of the Container Security Initiative which would screen cargo containers bound for the United States for radiological contents. This policy is intended to identify threats before they arrive at U.S. ports. The Bush administration argued that the policy would be too expensive to implement, as U.S. inspection teams, with equipment, would need to be installed in 700 foreign ports.
- Public health – In 1984, Lautenberg wrote the National Minimum Drinking Age Act that set the national drinking age at 21. In 2000, his legislation set 0.08 as the blood alcohol level threshold for drunk driving. He also wrote legislation that banned smoking on airplanes, in federal buildings, and in federally-funded buildings that serviced children.
- Social issues – Lautenberg was pro-choice on abortion, and voted against banning "partial-birth abortions" in 1999. He voted in favor of expanding embryonic stem cell research. The NAACP gave him a 100% rating, indicating his strong support for affirmative action.
  Lautenberg was a strong supporter of same-sex marriage, and also voted to prohibit job discrimination based on sexual orientation and to expand the federal definition of hate crimes to include sexual orientation. He voted against a constitutional amendment banning same-sex marriage, and expressed his support for equal marriage rights for LGBT couples in later years. Lautenberg did, however, vote in favor of the Defense of Marriage Act in 1996. The Human Rights Campaign gave him a 100% rating, indicating his strong support for LGBT rights. Lautenberg also cosponsored a bill in 2012 that would have removed the deadline for the Equal Rights Amendment and a new attempt for the ERA in 2013.
- Tax policy – Lautenberg voted against repealing and restricting the Alternative Minimum Tax and the estate tax. Lautenberg voted for the American Recovery and Reinvestment Act of 2009, which contained $280 billion in tax breaks by expanding the earned income tax credit, child tax credit, home energy credit, and college credit, introducing a homebuyer credit and a credit for workers earning less than $75,000, along with an increased ceiling for the AMT and extended tax credits to companies for renewable energy production, along with a new policy making more companies eligible for a certain tax refund. In 2008, he voted to raise taxes on those earning more than $1 million per year. In 2006, he voted in favor of repealing the Bush-era tax cut on capital gains.
- Transportation – Lautenberg supported federal funding of public transportation, such as Amtrak and New Jersey Transit. Lautenberg was primary sponsor of the S.294 [110th] "Passenger Rail Investment and Improvement Act of 2008" (Full Text), which would fund Amtrak for the next five years and provide opportunity for expansion. With the dramatic rise of gasoline prices from 2007 to 2008, Amtrak ridership has reached record levels. The bill passed the House, but Senate and House differences were never resolved. He was also a strong supporter of the commuter rail project Access to the Region's Core. When New Jersey Governor Chris Christie cancelled the project, Lautenberg called his move "one of the biggest public-policy blunders in New Jersey history", and said that, "All he knows how to do is blow hot air." The Frank R. Lautenberg Rail Station at Secaucus Junction was dedicated in 2003 with his name, because he helped allocate federal funds to build it.
- Miscellaneous – Since the advent of the late 2000s recession, Lautenberg supported a number of Democratic bills designed to deal with the resulting problems plaguing Americans. In 2009, he voted in favor of the American Recovery and Reinvestment Act of 2009, popularly dubbed the stimulus bill. He later voted for the Credit Cardholders' Bill of Rights and the Helping Families Save Their Homes Act of 2009.

== Personal life ==
=== Family ===
Frank Lautenberg married Lois Levenson in 1956; they had four children: Ellen, Nan, Lisa, and Joshua. Their 31-year marriage ended in divorce, in 1988. On 25 January 2004, he married his companion of nearly 16 years, Bonnie S. Englebardt. He also had two stepdaughters, Danielle Englebardt and Lara Englebardt Metz with Bonnie; and 13 grandchildren.

Lautenberg resided in Montclair, New Jersey for much of his Senate career and last resided in nearby Cliffside Park. In 2024, Lautenberg was awarded the Presidential Medal of Freedom by President Joe Biden, a Senate colleague for over two decades.

=== Health ===
On February 19, 2010, his office announced that Lautenberg had been diagnosed with a diffuse large b-cell lymphoma (an aggressive but curable blood cancer that appears in organs like the stomach) at Mount Sinai Medical Center in New York. He had been hospitalized with profuse gastric bleeding following a fall in his Cliffside Park, New Jersey, home shortly after returning from a Haiti trip with a 12-member congressional delegation. He was released from the hospital on February 25, 2010. Six to eight chemotherapy treatments of the intensive R-CHOP regimen followed every 21 days over several months, and a doctor for Lautenberg at the time said a full recovery was expected. Lautenberg continued his Senate work between treatments. On June 26, 2010, the senator announced that he was cancer-free.

=== Wealth ===
In 2010, Lautenberg's wealth was estimated to be between $55 million and $116.1 million, making him the fifth-wealthiest Senator. Lautenberg began collecting modern art after his election to the Senate, much of which was sold after his death.

== Death ==
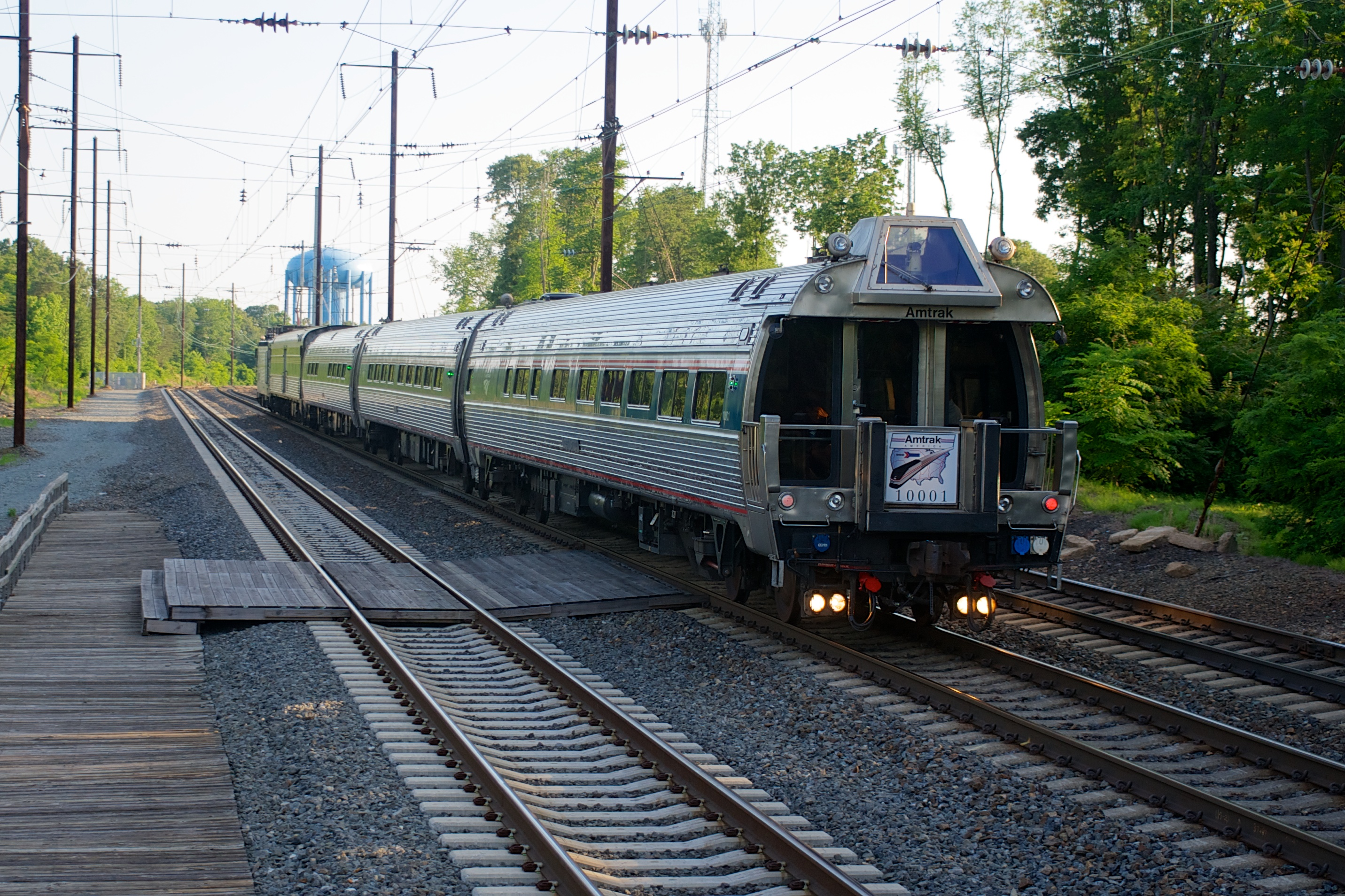
Lautenberg's funeral train passes Odenton, Maryland.

Lautenberg died at NewYork–Presbyterian Hospital in Manhattan on June 3, 2013, of viral pneumonia. He was 89.

Lautenberg was returned to Washington by an Amtrak funeral train. "Amtrak is honored to be chosen to carry him back to Washington, D.C. one final time," wrote Amtrak Chairman Tony Cosica and President/CEO Joseph Boardman in a joint public statement of condolence, "thank you Sen. Lautenberg for your service to the nation."

On June 6, 2013, his body lay in repose atop the Lincoln Catafalque within the Senate chamber at the Capitol. He was buried on June 7, 2013, with full military honors at Arlington National Cemetery.

Congress passed on September 20, 2013, a spending bill, H.J.Res.59 – Continuing Appropriations Resolution, 2014, that included a $174,000 tax-free death benefit payment to his widow. An annual salary payment to the widow or family member of a deceased lawmaker is a long-standing tradition for the United States Congress going back to the 1800s.

== Succession ==
On June 4, 2013, Governor Chris Christie announced that a special election to fill the vacant Senate seat would be held on October 16, 2013. A special primary, which was won by Cory Booker as the Democrat and Steve Lonegan as the Republican candidate, was held on August 13, 2013.

On June 6, 2013, Christie appointed Republican New Jersey Attorney General Jeffrey Chiesa to fill the Senate seat until the elected winner could be sworn in.

On October 17, 2013, Democrat Cory Booker was announced the winner of the special election.

== Legacy ==
The Frank R. Lautenberg Deep-Sea Coral Protection Area is an offshore marine protected area for deep-sea corals off the coast of the Mid-Atlantic states of the United States, established in 2016 and named after Lautenberg.

The Frank Lautenberg Railway Station at Secaucus Junction is named for Lautenberg who was a transit advocate and worked to have federal funds go to the project. His casket was brought to the station on its way to his final resting place.

== Electoral history ==
The results for Lautenberg's elections to the US Senate:

- 1982 election for US Senate
  - Frank Lautenberg (D), 51%
  - Millicent Fenwick (R), 48%
- 1988 election for US Senate
  - Frank Lautenberg (D) (inc.), 54%
  - Pete Dawkins (R), 45%
- 1994 election for US Senate
  - Frank Lautenberg (D) (inc.), 50%
  - Chuck Haytaian (R), 47%
  - Michael P. Kelly (Keep America First) 0.7%
  - Ben Grindlinger (Libertarian) 0.7%
  - Richard Pezzullo (Conservative) 0.4%
  - Andrea Lippi (Jobs, Property Rights) 0.3%
  - George Patrick Predham (Damn Drug Dealers) 0.2%
  - Joanne Kuniansky (Socialist Workers Party) 0.2%
  - Arlene Gold (Natural Law Party) 0.2%
- 2002 election for US Senate
  - Frank Lautenberg (D), 54%
  - Doug Forrester (R), 44%
- 2008 election for US Senate
  - Frank Lautenberg (D) (inc.), 56%
  - Dick Zimmer (R), 42%

== See also ==
- List of Columbia University alumni
- List of Jewish American politicians
- List of people buried at Arlington National Cemetery
- List of people from Montclair, New Jersey
- List of Polish Americans
- List of Russian Americans
- List of United States senators from New Jersey
- List of members of the United States Congress who died in office (2000–present)#2010s
- List of Jewish members of the United States Congress

== Sources ==
- Ostrovskaya, O.P. (June 23, 2017). Судьбы участников эмиграционного движения пятидесятников на дальнем востоке в 1970-1980-х гг. [The fate of participants in the Pentecostal emigration movement in the Far East in the 1970s-1980s.]. In S.M. Dudarionok; M.A. Tuliglovich (eds.). Владивосток – точка возвращения: прошлое и настоящее русской эмиграции. Материалы Второй международной научной конференции [Vladivostok – the point of return: past and present of Russian emigration. Proceedings of the Second International Scientific Conference] (PDF) (Digest of articles) (in Russian). Khabarovsk: Дальневосточный юридический институт Министерства внутренних дел Российской Федерации. ISBN 978-5-9753-0229-8. Archived from the original (PDF) on September 26, 2023.
- Gura, V.O. (2018). Andruschenko Viktor Petrovich (ed.). Історія та есхатологічні мотиви релігійної еміграції пізніх протестантів із СРСР 1987–2017 рр. [History and eschatological motives of the religious emigration of late Protestants from the USSR 1987–2017.] (PDF). Гілея: науковий вісник (in Ukrainian) (135). Kyiv: 171–175. ISSN 2076-1554.
- Semyonova, Victoria (January 3, 2020). Борис Перчаткин — о том, как помогал верующим из СССР попасть в США [Boris Perchatkin - how he helped believers from the USSR get to the USA]. usa.one (in Russian).

Party political offices
| Preceded by Harrison Williams | Democratic nominee for U.S. Senator from New Jersey (Class 1); 1982, 1988, 1994 | Succeeded by Jon Corzine |
| Preceded by Robert Torricelli | Democratic nominee for U.S. Senator from New Jersey (Class 2); 2002, 2008 | Succeeded by Cory Booker |
U.S. Senate
| Preceded by Nicholas Brady | United States Senator (Class 1) from New Jersey; 1982–2001; Served alongside: Bill Bradley, Robert Torricelli | Succeeded by Jon Corzine |
| Preceded by J. James Exon | Ranking Member of the Senate Budget Committee; 1997–2001 | Succeeded by Pete Domenici |
| Preceded by Robert Torricelli | United States Senator (Class 2) from New Jersey; 2003–2013; Served alongside: Jon Corzine, Bob Menendez | Succeeded by Jeffrey Chiesa |
Honorary titles
| Preceded by Robert Byrd | Oldest United States Senator; 2010–2013 | Succeeded by Dianne Feinstein |
