= Peter Dawkins =

Peter Dawkins may refer to:

- Pete Dawkins (born 1938), American college football player, military officer, business executive
- Peter Dawkins (musician) (1946–2014), New Zealand musician and producer, based in Australia
