= Denying Firearms and Explosives to Dangerous Terrorists Act of 2007 =

The Denying Firearms and Explosives to Dangerous Terrorists Act of 2007, Senate Bill 1237, was a proposed item of legislation requested by United States Attorney General Alberto Gonzales and introduced in the United States Senate by New Jersey Senator Frank Lautenberg which would have permitted the Attorney General to deny the right to purchase weapons to persons who have been identified by the administration as dangerous terrorists. The proposal led to criticism from gun rights advocates concerned by the uncertain criteria by which names end up on various terror watch lists such as the U.S. No Fly List.
