= Boris Perchatkin =

Religious life
- Religion: Christianity
- Denomination: Pentecostal

Boris Perchatkin (Note: In this name that follows East Slavic naming customs, the patronymic is Georgiyevich and the family name is Perchatkin.) (Russian: Бори́с Гео́ргиевич Перча́ткин; born 1 July 1946) — the most famous participant in the Nakhodka's religious emigration movement of the late 1970s and early 1980s, a human rights activist who lobbied in the United States for the adoption of the "Lautenberg's Amendment" in 1989, as a result of which about 1 million people emigrated to the United States from the countries of the former USSR.

== Biography ==
=== Early years and joining the church ===
Boris Perchatkin was born in family of a military pilot who died in a car accident shortly after Boris was born. Some time after the death of her first husband, Boris' mother remarried a military man, who in 1953 was arrested for failure to follow orders during the riots and given 25 years of exile in the Vorkuta's camps. At the age of 16, Boris found a Pentecostal church in the city of Nakhodka, which he joined. Later, he collected information about the persecution of believers and actively shared it with foreign journalists.

=== Joining the emigration movement and contacts with dissidents ===
In 1976, Perchatkin, together with his associates Vasily Patrushev, V. A. Burlachenko and Vladimir Stepanov, established contact with dissidents in Moscow and received recommendations "to direct the wave of emigration into an organized direction". In the same year, a representative of the Moscow Helsinki Group, L.V. Voronina, arrived in Nakhodka. Beginning this year, Perchatkin actively sought the mass departure of Pentecostals from the USSR. In the same year, Perchatkin sent appeals to the UN, to the World Council of Churches and the heads of state that signed the Helsinki Accords, in which he spoke about the constant persecution of believers in the USSR.

In 1977, together with Nikolai Goretoy, he spoke out in defense of the arrested dissidents Alexander Ginzburg, Yuri Orlov and Anatoly Sharansky, appealing to the Christians of the world on behalf of the Pentecostals. In the same year, together with other Christians from different denominations, he took part in a public hunger strike, the purpose of which was to obtain permission for persecuted Christians to leave the USSR.

On December 20, 1978, Perchatkin tried to send a congratulatory New Year's telegram to US President Jimmy Carter through the Nakhodka Post Office asking for attention to those who do not have freedom of religion.

Since 1979, he carried out organizational work to create a Center for Emigration-minded Believers in the USSR, claiming to be its leader. In 1980, he was elected as secretary of the created Council of Soviet Pentecostal Churches who were inclined to emigrate. At the end of 1979, Perchatkin wrote a statement "To the Congress and the government of the United States, the governments of Canada, Australia, England, Germany, France and Italy," in which he spoke about Soviet reality, the program provisions of the CPSU on religious issues in the USSR and outlined Soviet legislation on religious cults.

=== State repressions and imprisonment ===
He was an active member of the committee of believers who applied to emigrate. The Soviet government organized the persecution of Perchatkin and his family through the publication in the central city newspaper of articles "Hypocrite wholesale and retail", "Convictions of convenience", "Before it’s too late", etc.

On August 21, 1980, Perchatkin was arrested in Nakhodka, and at the end of March 1981 he was convicted under Article 190.1 of the Criminal Code of the RSFSR for spreading "deliberately false fabrications discrediting the Soviet state and social system" to 2 years in prison. According to the Voice of America radio station, during the investigation and at trial, chemicals were used on Perchatkin, which caused him to lose consciousness.

In August 1982, Perchatkin was released and subsequently continued to seek the right to emigrate from the USSR. In February 1983, he was arrested again and then sentenced under Part 2 of Article 218 of the Criminal Code of the RSFSR to 1.5 years for illegally carrying cold weapon.

=== Diplomatic work and emigration to the United States ===
In 1987, Perchatkin compiled report for the US Congress "On the State of Religion in the USSR". This report was read in the US Congress and Perchatkin was invited to a meeting with US Secretary of State George Shultz to talk about religious migration, as well as with US Supreme Court Chief Justice William Rehnquist and the US Under Secretary of State for Religious Affairs. In May 1988, when US President Ronald Reagan came to the USSR on an official visit to meet with Gorbachev, Perchatkin was invited to a meeting with Reagan's wife, Nancy Reagan, as part of a delegation of 40 people to discuss the issue of religious freedom in the USSR. On May 30, 1988, Perchatkin represented Soviet Protestants at this meeting. For about two hours he told Nancy Reagan about the state of affairs with freedom of religion in the USSR, after which Nancy Reagan invited Perchatkin to read a report on the situation of religion in the USSR to the US Congress.

On July 26, 1988, Perchatkin emigrated to the USA along with his entire family. On August 4, he spoke at the US Congress with report on the genocide of believers in the USSR, which he subsequently discussed with congressmen, senators and diplomats. The result of these discussions was the adoption in 1989 of the "Lautenberg Amendment", named after Democratic Senator from New Jersey Frank Lautenberg. In the first decade of this amendment, about 350,000 religious migrants entered the United States, and in the period until 2010 – about 1 million. The mass exodus of Pentecostals from Nakhodka began in 1988, when 152 adults left, not counting young children. In 1989, 45 adult Pentecostals emigrated from Nakhodka.

=== Human rights activities in the United States ===
While in the US, Perchatkin created his own website, on which he described the details of his arrest and imprisonment during the struggle for emigration and organized the Christian human rights organization AARC (American-Russian Relief Committee). He also published an autobiographical book, "Paths of Fire", which was reprinted several times.

In the summer of 2025, Boris Perchatkin, along with like-minded individuals at the US State Department and the Commission on International Religious Freedom, reported that Christian pacifists in Ukraine and Russia were being persecuted, denied alternative civilian service, forcibly conscripted (see busification), subjected to arrest, violence, and threats for refusing to participate in combat, as well as discriminated against and prosecuted. In this regard, Boris Perchatkin lobbied for the creation of a separate immigration quota for Ukrainian Christian pacifists who came to the US under the U4U program.

== Mentions ==
Boris Perchatkin was mentioned by Andrei Sakharov among other political prisoners in his article "Responsibility of Scientists," written in 1981

== Bibliography ==
- Boris Perchatkin – "Paths of Fire", 2011

== Sources ==
- Ostrovskaya, O.P. (23 June 2017). Судьбы участников эмиграционного движения пятидесятников на дальнем востоке в 1970-1980-х гг. [The fate of participants in the Pentecostal emigration movement in the Far East in the 1970s–1980s.]. In S.M. Dudarionok; M.A. Tuliglovich (eds.). Владивосток – точка возвращения: прошлое и настоящее русской эмиграции. Материалы Второй международной научной конференции [Vladivostok – the point of return: past and present of Russian emigration. Proceedings of the Second International Scientific Conference] (PDF) (Digest of articles) (in Russian). Khabarovsk: Дальневосточный юридический институт Министерства внутренних дел Российской Федерации. ISBN 978-5-9753-0229-8. Archived from the original (PDF) on 2023-09-26.
- Gura, V.O. (2018). Andruschenko Viktor Petrovich (ed.). Історія та есхатологічні мотиви релігійної еміграції пізніх протестантів із СРСР 1987–2017 рр. [History and eschatological motives of the religious emigration of late Protestants from the USSR 1987–2017.] (PDF). Гілея: науковий вісник (in Ukrainian) (135). Kyiv: 171–175. ISSN 2076-1554.
