= Permanent normal trade relations =

U.S. foreign policy designation

The status of permanent normal trade relations (PNTR) is a legal designation in the United States for free trade with a foreign state. The designation was changed from most favored nation (MFN) to normal trade relations by Section 5003 of the Internal Revenue Service Restructuring and Reform Act of 1998. Permanent was added to normal trade relations some time later.

In international trade, MFN status (or treatment) is awarded by one country to another. It means that the receiving nation will be granted all trade advantages, such as low tariffs, that any other country also receives. Thus, a country with MFN status will not be discriminated against and will not be treated worse than any other country with MFN status.

== Applicability ==
Granting of permanent normal trade relations status is automatic, except where specifically denied by law.

Embargoes also apply to additional parties; see United States embargoes.

== History ==
In 1948, the United States joined the General Agreement on Tariffs and Trade (GATT), the predecessor organization of the World Trade Organization. In accordance with GATT provisions the United States agreed to extend what was then called Most Favored-Nation status (MFN) to all GATT member countries. This status was also applied to some countries that were not GATT members. However, a member may opt out of its obligations by invoking the non-application provision (Article XIII of the WTO or Article XXXV of the GATT) if it determines it cannot extend GATT/WTO principles to newly acceding members for political reasons.

In 1951, the U.S. Congress directed President Harry Truman to revoke MFN status to the Soviet Union and other Communist countries except for Yugoslavia. During the Cold War, most Communist countries were denied MFN status if they did not meet certain conditions.

In December 1960, Poland was granted MFN status by President Eisenhower. In 1962, Congress enacted a directive that jeopardized the MFN status of Poland and Yugoslavia; however, the directive was delayed until a new one was passed that allowed any countries with MFN to keep the status if the President determined it to be in the national interest of the United States.

Title IV of the Trade Act of 1974 superseded these provisions. Section 401 of Title IV requires the President to withhold MFN status from countries that had not acquired that status by the time of the law's enactment on January 3, 1975. In effect, this meant all communist countries, except Poland and Yugoslavia. Section 402, the Jackson–Vanik amendment, withholds MFN status from countries with strict restriction on freedom of emigration. Countries that wish to have PNTR must fulfill two basic requirements: (1) comply with the Jackson–Vanik provisions of the Trade Act of 1974 that states that the President of the United States determines that a country neither denies or impedes the right or opportunity of its citizens to emigrate; and (2) reach a bilateral commercial agreement with the United States. Jackson–Vanik allows for the President to issue a yearly waiver to allow the granting of PNTR.

For many years, People's Republic of China (PRC) was the most important country in this group which required an annual waiver to maintain free trade status. The waiver for the PRC had been in effect since 1980. Every year between 1989 and 1999, legislation was introduced in Congress to disapprove the President's waiver. The legislation had sought to tie free trade with China to meeting certain human rights conditions that go beyond freedom of emigration. All such attempted legislation failed to pass. The requirement of an annual waiver was inconsistent with the rules of the World Trade Organization, and for the PRC to join the WTO, Congressional action was needed to grant PNTR to the PRC. This was accomplished in late 1999, allowing the PRC to join WTO in the following year.

By Act of Congress, the United States granted permanent normal trade relations (PNTR) status to Czechoslovakia (later the Czech Republic and Slovakia), Hungary, and Romania after the fall of the communist governments in those countries. The United States granted PNTR to Albania, Bulgaria, Cambodia, Estonia, Latvia, and Lithuania before their countries acceded to the WTO. Before it granted PNTR, the United States invoked the non-application provision against Mongolia for more than two years after it joined the WTO on January 29, 1997. It also invoked the provision against Armenia from its WTO accession on February 5, 2003, until it was granted PNTR on January 7, 2005, and with Kyrgyzstan from when it joined the WTO on December 20, 1998, until receiving PNTR on June 29, 2000.

According to a 2005 Congressional Research Service report, as of 2005, only Cuba (see United States embargo against Cuba) and North Korea (see North Korea–United States relations), were specifically denied NTR status. The same report said that in accordance with the Jackson–Vanik amendment, Belarus and Turkmenistan had been temporarily afforded NTR treatment by presidential waiver and that Azerbaijan, Kazakhstan, Tajikistan, and Uzbekistan were temporarily afforded NTR treatment by a presidential compliance determination.

In December 2006, the U.S. granted Permanent Normal Trade Relations status to Vietnam. Vietnam had a temporary free trade status on a year-to-year waiver basis as a prerequisite for accession to the WTO since 2001.

In the same year Ukraine was granted PNTR. In December 2012, President Barack Obama signed the Russia and Moldova Jackson–Vanik Repeal and Sergei Magnitsky Rule of Law Accountability Act of 2012 (Magnitsky Act) granting PNTR to Russia and Moldova.

In April 2022, President Joe Biden signed a law which revokes the PNTR status for Russia and Belarus. This happened as part of a coordinated action of the European Union and G7 countries to collectively revoke any MFN status from Russia in response to the 2022 Russian invasion of Ukraine.

== U.S. and China ==
The Trade Act of 1974 required the trade status of PRC be reviewed annually. On May 15, 2000, Representative William Reynolds Archer, a Republican from Texas, introduced H.R. 4444 to make the trade status of China permanent, saying that the bill was a top priority for the rest of the year and it was vital to the U.S. agriculture market to have access to a market that accounts for one-fifth of the world's population.

Congress added some important points into the legislation to make sure that when the PRC entered the World Trade Organization it could be reprimanded for crimes against the workers of the country, and certain markets would be mutually exclusive between the two countries. The People's Republic of China would need to abide by human rights for their workers as stated in the internationally recognized worker rights. To monitor the workers' rights Congress established the Congressional–Executive Commission on the People's Republic of China. The commission was to monitor acts of China which reflect compliance or violation, compile lists of persons believed to be imprisoned, detained, or tortured due to pursuit of their human rights, monitor the development of the rule of law in China, and encourage the development of programs and activities of the U.S. government and private organizations with a goal of increasing the interchange of people and ideas. The committee formed, along with the Office of the United States Trade Representative (USTR), and the International Trade Commission (ITC) was to give an annual report to the President.

Congress believed that they needed to pass a bill that would help the economy stay stimulated if not have a higher growth than at the time. The most productive and trouble-free way to keep the economy growing strong was to outsource and trade more with China. China was to help provide America with superior markets in industry, agriculture, and technology. Congress as whole thought that without these things America would fall behind economically and technologically to some enemies of America. If China did not get support from America they could go to another country that would not be so strict on their treatment of people, and they could use that country to gain access to the WTO. The down side to this was that no markets could provide and receive China's goods like the United States markets could.

The International Trade Commission's report was the determination of China's impacts on United States market, and how those certain disruptions can be remedied or expanded. The ITC was to find what domestic industries were being hurt by the trade and to present how the repair could be made. This was the most important part of the bill for most of the country. The bill breaks down to depending on how the different markets in the U.S. economy are doing it can use China's markets as a catalyst to help stabilize when need be.

The bill created a stir among Congress and the American people when presented because people did not believe that America could actually do anything to help regulate China's treatment of workers. Aside from people's rights activists many business men believed in the bill to help flourish the different areas of industry. The legislation was passed by the House of Representatives on May 24, 2000, and by the Senate on September 19, 2000. Members of the senate wanted to add in amendments on treating their workers even better than stated in previous legislation, and to make the punishment for breaking the rules greater. Congress was up for re-election that year so due to time constraints all twenty four amendments were rejected. The President signed on Oct 10, 2000 and that day it became Pub. L. 106–286 (text) (PDF).

US imports from China more than quadrupled between 2000 and 2015, increasing the decline of US manufacturing jobs. Since the passing of the bill there have been three attempts to repeal the PNTR with China. The strongest attempt was in 2005 when House Representative Bernie Sanders and 61 co-sponsors introduced a legislation that would repeal the Permanent Normal Trade Relations with China. Rep. Sanders said to the House, "anyone who takes an objective look at our trade policy with China must conclude that is an absolute failure and needs to be fundamentally overhauled". The Representative cited statistics, including the increase in the trade deficit and the number of American jobs lost to overseas competitors. One point that Sanders did not make due to time constraints and the legislation being passed so quickly was that nothing in the way China treats its workers has changed.

In November 2024, John Moolenaar, chairman of the United States House Select Committee on Strategic Competition between the United States and the Chinese Communist Party, introduced legislation to revoke PNTR status for the People's Republic of China. The same month, the United States–China Economic and Security Review Commission unanimously recommended revocation of China's PNTR status.

== See also ==
- US labor law
- Trade pact
