= 2008 United States Senate election in New Jersey =

- November 4, 2008
- Turnout: 73% (▲27pp)
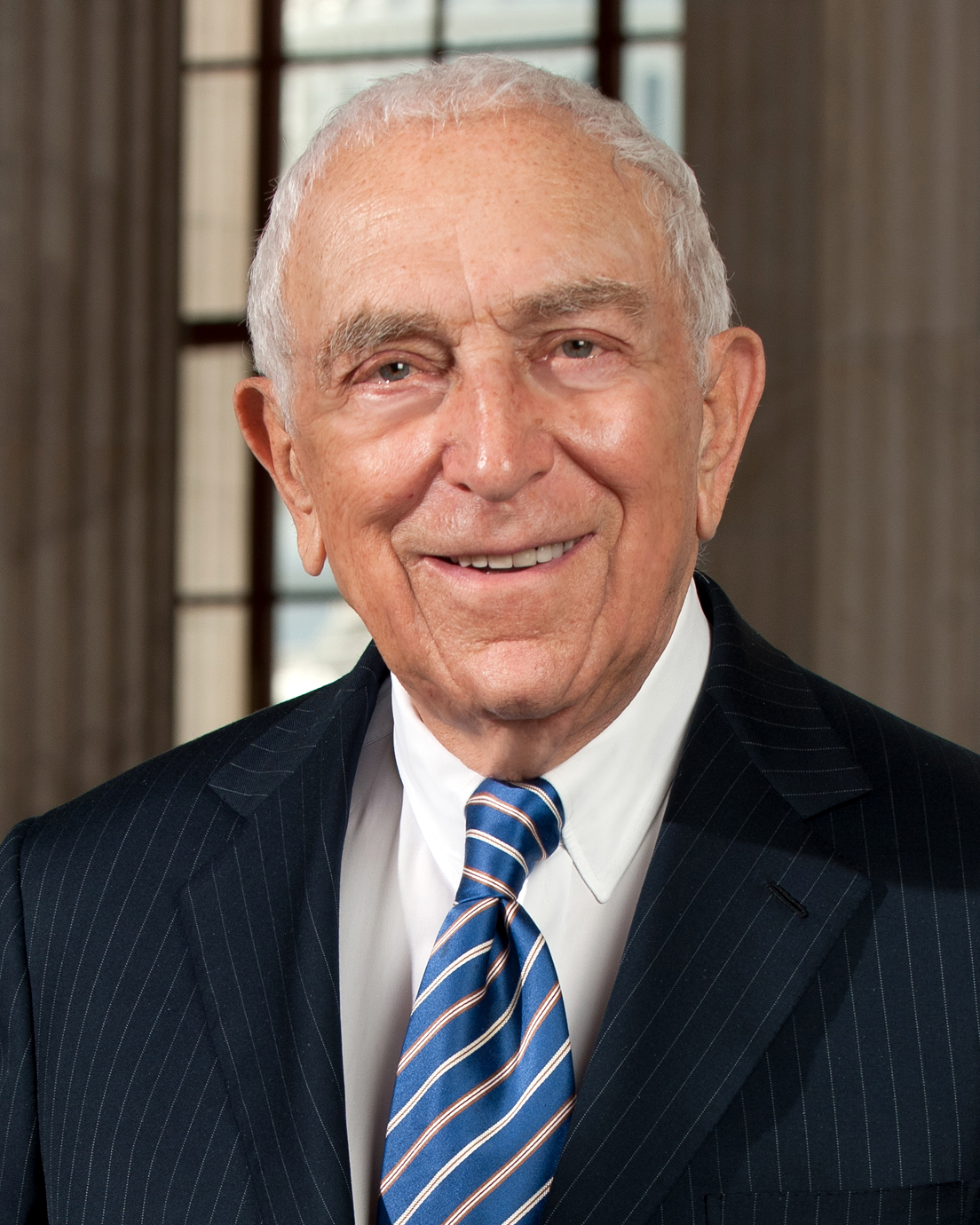

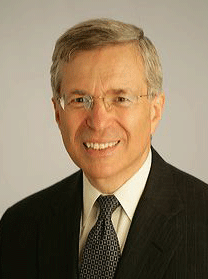
Nominee	Frank Lautenberg	Dick Zimmer
Party	Democratic	Republican
Popular vote	1,951,218	1,461,025
Percentage	56.03%	41.95%
- Lautenberg: 40–50% 50–60% 60–70% 70–80% 80–90% >90% Zimmer: 40–50% 50–60% 60–70% 70–80% 80–90%
U.S. senator before election
Frank Lautenberg
Democratic
Elected U.S. Senator
Frank Lautenberg
Democratic

The 2008 United States Senate election in New Jersey was held on November 4, 2008. Incumbent Democratic U.S. Senator Frank Lautenberg won re-election to a fifth, non-consecutive term, defeating former Republican congressman Dick Zimmer, who was also the nominee for this seat in 1996. This is the most recent U.S. Senate race in New Jersey where both major candidates have since died.

== Background ==
In November 2006, Senator Lautenberg had the lowest approval rating of any Democratic incumbent running for re-election in 2008 (with 39% of respondents approving and 45% disapproving), with his approval improving only slightly to 42% as of September 2007. In September 2007, his approval had improved slightly to 42%, but 46% of respondents in the same survey believed that Lautenberg did not deserve re-election (against 36% who believed he did) and 54% believed that he was too old to effectively serve another six-year term in the Senate.

However, the prevailing political climate at the time of the election was also a major factor. Voter anger was directed against the Republican Party, and many Democrats once considered vulnerable managed to hold on.

== Democratic primary ==
=== Candidates ===
==== Nominee ====
- Frank Lautenberg, incumbent U.S. senator (1982–2001, 2003–2013)

==== Eliminated in primary ====
- Rob Andrews, U.S. representative from NJ-01 (1990–2014)
- Donald Cresitello, mayor of Morristown (1977–1981, 2006–2010)

=== Polling ===
Poll source	Date(s) administered	Sample size (Note: Key: A – all adults RV – registered voters LV – likely voters V – unclear)	Margin of error	Frank Kautenberg	Rob Andrews	Donald Cresitello	Undecided
Rasmussen Reports	May 15, 2008	500 (LV)	± 4.5%	49%	19%	7%	25%
Joel Benenson (D) (Note: Poll sponsored by the DSCC)	April 1–2, 2008	500 (LV)	–	52%	21%	–	27%

=== Results ===
Democratic primary results
Party	Candidate	Votes	%
Democratic	Frank Lautenberg (incumbent)	203,012	58.9%
Democratic	Rob Andrews	121,777	35.3%
Democratic	Donald Cresitello	19,743	5.7%
Total votes		344,532	100.0%

==== Results by county ====
Results by county
County	Lautenberg	%	Andrews	%	Cresitello	%
Atlantic	4,798	45.4%	5,287	50.1%	472	4.5%
Bergen	26,848	78.9%	5,645	16.6%	1,554	4.6%
Burlington	7,757	42.4%	9,483	51.8%	1,059	5.8%
Camden	5,995	16.5%	29,175	80.1%	1,256	3.4%
Cape May	1,433	45.4%	1,566	49.6%	159	5.0%
Cumberland	1,746	46.1%	1,799	47.5%	246	6.5%
Essex	31,844	76.4%	8,671	20.8%	1,190	2.9%
Gloucester	3,135	17.0%	14,775	80.0%	563	3.0%
Hudson	28,446	74.8%	8,233	21.7%	1,343	3.5%
Hunterdon	2,061	58.8%	1,180	33.7%	264	7.5%
Mercer	10,093	74.0%	3,053	22.4%	494	3.6%
Middlesex	17,131	62.0%	7,918	28.7%	2,573	9.3%
Monmouth	10,570	66.3%	3,568	22.4%	1,808	11.3%
Morris	8,432	65.0%	3,151	24.3%	1,394	10.7%
Ocean	8,869	57.9%	5,037	32.9%	1,421	9.3%
Passaic	9,842	79.3%	1,700	13.7%	872	7.0%
Salem	928	31.9%	1,734	59.6%	248	8.5%
Somerset	5,640	64.7%	2,209	25.3%	873	10.0%
Sussex	1,379	52.7%	784	29.9%	456	17.4%
Union	15,103	67.6%	6,179	27.7%	1,060	4.7%
Warren	962	47.4%	630	31.0%	438	21.6%

== Republican primary ==
=== Candidates ===
- Joseph Pennacchio, state senator
- Murray Sabrin, professor at Ramapo College and perennial candidate
- Dick Zimmer, former U.S. Representative and nominee for the U.S. Senate in 1996

==== Withdrew ====
- Anne Evans Estabrook, real estate developer
- Andrew Unanue, former Goya Foods executive (endorsed Zimmer)

==== Declined ====
- Kip Bateman, state senator
- Mehmet Oz, cardiologist

=== Results ===
Republican primary results
Party	Candidate	Votes	%
Republican	Dick Zimmer	84,663	45.8%
Republican	Joseph Pennacchio	74,546	40.3%
Republican	Murray Sabrin	25,576	13.8%
Total votes		184,785	100.0%

Official results, New Jersey Division of Elections (PDF, July 11, 2008)

==== Results by county ====
County	Zimmer	%	Pennacchio	%	Sabrin	%
Atlantic	3,909	65%	1,322	22%	810	13%
Bergen	5,145	30%	10,761	62%	1,384	8%
Burlington	8,629	63%	2,869	21%	2,276	16%
Camden	3,123	49%	2,166	34%	1,036	16%
Cape May	3,615	70%	1,034	20%	483	9%
Cumberland	1,566	72%	395	18%	225	10%
Essex	3,592	57%	2,262	36%	493	8%
Gloucester	1,206	26%	2,161	47%	1,254	27%
Hudson	1,487	48%	955	31%	641	21%
Hunterdon	5,519	60%	2,730	30%	977	11%
Mercer	2,555	56%	1,538	34%	488	11%
Middlesex	2,603	33%	4,195	54%	1,021	13%
Monmouth	7,981	56%	4,630	33%	1,510	11%
Morris	8,094	36%	12,700	56%	1,855	8%
Ocean	10,875	48%	4,820	21%	6,778	30%
Passaic	1,271	20%	4,570	72%	545	8%
Salem	769	47%	657	41%	193	12%
Somerset	5,227	46%	4,875	43%	1,170	10%
Sussex	2,850	40%	3,621	51%	647	9%
Union	2,896	32%	4,653	52%	1,388	15%
Warren	1,751	46%	1,632	43%	402	11%

== General election ==
=== Candidates ===
- Jeff Boss, perennial candidate and conspiracy theorist (Independent)
- Daryl Mikell Brooks (Independent)
- J.M. Carter (Independent)
- Carl Peter Klapper (Independent; write-in)
- Frank Lautenberg, incumbent U.S. Senator (Democratic)
- Sara Lobman (Socialist Workers)
- Jason Scheurer (Libertarian)
- Dick Zimmer, former U.S. Representative (Republican)

=== Debates ===
The first poll conducted after the primaries showed a tighter than expected race between Lautenberg and Zimmer, with the two candidates in a virtual tie.

On October 29, 2008, a debate between Lautenberg and Zimmer was held on the radio station NJ 101.5.

On November 1, 2008, the two candidates debated for the second time on New Jersey Network, in the only televised debate agreed to by the Lautenberg campaign.

=== Predictions ===
Source	Ranking	As of
The Cook Political Report	Safe D	October 23, 2008
CQ Politics	Likely D	October 31, 2008
Rothenberg Political Report	Safe D	November 2, 2008
Real Clear Politics	Likely D	October 31, 2008

=== Polling ===
Source	Date	Frank Lautenberg (D)	Dick Zimmer (R)
Rasmussen Reports	June 4, 2008	45%	44%
Quinnipiac University	June 5–8, 2008	47%	38%
Fairleigh Dickinson University	June 17–22, 2008	45%	28%
Rasmussen Reports	July 7, 2008	49%	36%
Strategic Vision	July 11–13, 2008	48%	32%
Monmouth University	July 17–21, 2008	45%	37%
Club for Growth	July 30–31, 2008	35%	36%
Rasmussen Reports	August 4, 2008	51%	33%
Quinnipiac University	August 4–10, 2008	48%	41%
Fairleigh Dickinson University	September 4–7, 2008	46%	35%
Marist College	September 5–8, 2008	51%	40%
The Record / Research 2000	September 9–11, 2008	49%	41%
Quinnipiac University	September 10–14, 2008	48%	39%
Monmouth University	September 11–14, 2008	46%	36%
Strategic Vision	September 14–16, 2008	47%	40%
Rasmussen Reports	September 16, 2008	49%	42%
Survey USA	September 27–28, 2008	51%	38%
Strategic Vision	September 26–28, 2008	48%	41%
Fairleigh Dickinson University	September 29 – October 5, 2008	50%	34%
Rasmussen Reports	October 7, 2008	51%	37%
Survey USA	October 11–12, 2008	51%	38%
Monmouth University	October 15–18, 2008	52%	36%
Quinnipiac University	October 16–19, 2008	55%	33%
Marist College	October 20–21, 2008	48%	41%
Strategic Vision	October 24–26, 2008	49%	41%
Survey USA	October 29–30, 2008	52%	37%

=== Results ===
2008 United States Senate election in New Jersey
Party	Candidate	Votes	%	±%
Democratic	Frank Lautenberg (incumbent)	1,951,218	56.03%	+2.15%
Republican	Dick Zimmer	1,461,025	41.95%	−2.00%
Independent	Daryl Mikell Brooks	20,920	0.60%	n/a
Libertarian	Jason Scheurer	18,810	0.54%	−0.05
Independent	J.M. Carter	15,935	0.46%	n/a
Independent	Jeff Boss	10,345	0.30%	n/a
Socialist Workers	Sara Lobman	9,187	0.26%	n/a
Total votes		3,482,445	100.00%	n/a
Democratic hold				

==== By county ====
County	Frank Lautenberg December		Dick Zimmer Republican		Various candidates Other parties		Margin		Total votes cast
County	#	%	#	%	#	%	#	%	Total votes cast
Atlantic	61,464	56.54%	45,509	41.87%	1,724	1.59%	15,955	14.67%	108,697
Bergen	210,799	56.69%	159,306	42.84%	1,724	0.46%	51,493	13.85%	371,829
Burlington	114,781	56.32%	85,841	42.12%	3,191	1.57%	28,940	14.20%	203,813
Camden	144,640	66.56%	69,821	32.13%	2,849	1.31%	74,819	34.43%	217,310
Cape May	20,374	45.22%	23,697	52.60%	984	2.18%	-3,323	-7.38%	45,055
Cumberland	31,052	61.00%	18,498	36.34%	1,357	2.66%	12,554	24.66%	50,907
Essex	198,623	75.01%	61,829	23.35%	4,348	1.64%	136,794	51.66%	264,800
Gloucester	72,990	55.72%	55,024	42.00%	2,992	2.28%	17,966	13.72%	131,006
Hudson	126,098	73.72%	40,573	23.72%	4,373	2.56%	85,525	50.00%	171,044
Hunterdon	22,824	34.89%	40,309	61.63%	2,276	3.48%	-17,485	-26.74%	65,409
Mercer	91,088	62.22%	52,298	35.73%	3,004	2.05%	38,790	26.49%	146,390
Middlesex	175,284	59.55%	112,590	38.25%	6,489	2.20%	62,694	21.30%	294,363
Monmouth	132,189	45.67%	150,238	51.90%	7,034	2.43%	-18,049	-6.23%	289,461
Morris	94,558	42.52%	124,198	55.85%	3,620	1.63%	-29,640	-13.33%	222,376
Ocean	109,393	43.12%	139,480	54.98%	4,839	1.91%	-30,087	-11.86%	253,712
Passaic	100,598	61.36%	59,556	36.33%	3,798	2.32%	41,042	25.03%	163,952
Salem	16,132	52.97%	12,869	42.26%	1,452	4.77%	3,263	10.71%	30,453
Somerset	66,939	47.13%	71,392	50.27%	3,691	2.60%	-4,453	-3.14%	142,022
Sussex	27,178	37.77%	41,660	57.89%	3,124	4.34%	-14,482	-20.12%	71,962
Union	116,201	61.53%	69,069	36.57%	3,578	1.89%	47,132	24.96%	188,848
Warren	18,019	38.91%	27,258	58.87%	1,027	2.22%	-9,239	-19.96%	46,304
Totals	1,951,218	56.03%	1,461,025	41.95%	70,202	2.02%	490,193	14.08%	3,482,445

== See also ==
- 2008 United States elections

== Notes ==
Partisan clients
