= 1988 United States Senate election in New Jersey =

- November 8, 1988
- Turnout: 77% (▲15pp)
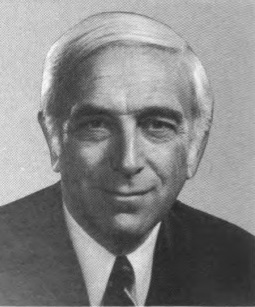

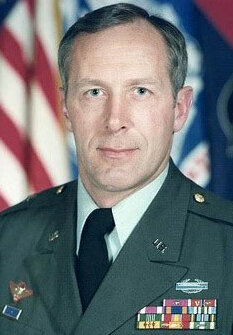
Nominee	Frank Lautenberg	Pete Dawkins
Party	Democratic	Republican
Popular vote	1,599,905	1,349,937
Percentage	53.55%	45.18%
- Lautenberg: 50–60% 60–70% 80–90% Dawkins: 40–50% 50–60% 60–70%
U.S. senator before election
Frank Lautenberg
Democratic
Elected U.S. Senator
Frank Lautenberg
Democratic

The 1988 United States Senate election in New Jersey was held on November 8, 1988. Incumbent Democratic U.S. Senator Frank Lautenberg won re-election to a second term with a margin of 8.37%. This is the last time that New Jersey simultaneously voted for presidential and U.S. Senate candidates of different parties.

== Background ==
Businessman Frank Lautenberg was elected in 1982 in a hard-fought, come-from-behind upset victory over U.S. Representative Millicent Fenwick. Given his narrow victory and low name recognition, New Jersey Republicans eagerly targeted his seat as a potential victory. Popular second-term Governor Thomas Kean led the efforts to recruit a challenger.

== Democratic primary ==
=== Candidates ===
- Frank Lautenberg, incumbent Senator since 1983
- Elnardo J. Webster, former Hudson County Freeholder
- Harold J. Young

=== Campaign ===
Senator Lautenberg formally launched his re-election campaign in April. He ignored his primary opponents, instead focusing on the general election and Pete Dawkins.

=== Results ===
1988 Democratic U.S. Senate primary
Party	Candidate	Votes	%
Democratic	Frank Lautenberg (incumbent)	326,072	77.76%
Democratic	Elnardo J. Webster	51,938	12.39%
Democratic	Harold J. Young	41,303	9.85%
Total votes		419,313	100.00%

== Republican primary ==
=== Candidates ===
- Pete Dawkins, financial executive and retired U.S. Army brigadier general

==== Declined ====
- Leonard S. Coleman Jr., New Jersey Commissioner of Community Affairs

=== Campaign ===
In 1987, Governor Thomas Kean recruited Pete Dawkins to move from New York City to Rumson, New Jersey in order to campaign as a Republican for Senate. Kean served as Dawkins's campaign chair. Efforts to recruit Dawkins were paired with efforts to persuade Commissioner of Community Affairs Leonard S. Coleman Jr. against running; Coleman was a personal friend of the Governor and was the early favorite to challenge Lautenberg.

Pete Dawkins announced his campaign on March 1 with the enthusiastic endorsement of Governor Kean. At his campaign announcement, Kean praised Dawkins as "the only West Point cadet in history to be the Captain of Cadets, president of his class, captain of the football team and finish in the top 5 percent of his class, and, by the way, pick up a Heisman Trophy and Rhodes Scholarship on the side." Dawkins pledged support for giving a presidential line-item veto and a "sweeping reform" of the federal budget process, while favoring budget cuts, including cuts to military spending, over tax increases.

On April 19, President Reagan appeared and spoke at a pre-primary fundraising dinner for Dawkins in Washington D.C., where Dawkins presented Reagan with a football signed by many Heisman Trophy winners.

=== Results ===
Dawkins was unopposed in the primary.

1988 Republican U.S. Senate primary
Party	Candidate	Votes	%
Republican	Pete Dawkins	155,886	100.00%
Total votes		155,886	100.00%

== General election ==
=== Candidates ===
- Pete Dawkins, financial executive and retired U.S. Army brigadier general (Republican)
- Thomas A. Fiske (Socialist Workers)
- Joseph F. Job, Bergen County Sheriff and candidate for U.S. Senate in 1970 (Independent)
- Frank Lautenberg, incumbent U.S. Senator since 1983 (Democratic)
- Jerry Zeldin (Libertarian)

=== Campaign ===
With no serious primary threat, Lautenberg and Dawkins targeted each other from early March. Both candidates being political moderates, the campaign quickly turned personal. On the day of Dawkins's campaign announcement, Lautenberg pointed out that he was a lifelong New Jerseyan, while Dawkins had moved to the state to run for Senate. Dawkins responded, "The important thing is not where we were born, but who we are, what our vision for the state is, and how we intend to act in the United States Senate." Lautenberg's carpetbagging accusation was a theme throughout the campaign. Dawkins aimed to tie himself to the popular Governor Kean, while Lautenberg leaned on his relationship with New Jersey's more popular senior Senator, Bill Bradley.

The campaign was full of political mudslinging. In addition to his carpetbagging accusation, Lautenberg's campaign also accused Dawkins's of lying about his war record. Dawkins accused Lautenberg of running a smear campaign, called him a "swamp dog", and criticized him for saying he voted eight times against a senatorial pay raise without mentioning the fact that he did vote once for the pay raise.

Paul Begala and James Carville consulted for the Lautenberg campaign, while Roger Stone consulted for Dawkins. Stone called Dawkins “the biggest thing to hit New Jersey since Bill Bradley.”

=== Polling ===
Poll source	Date(s) administered	Sample size (Note: Key: A – all adults RV – registered voters LV – likely voters V – unclear)	Margin of error	Frank Lautenberg (D)	Pete Dawkins (R)	Other/ Undecided
The Star-Ledger/Eagleton	Jan. 29–Feb. 8, 1988	587 LV	±4.2%	45%	16%	40%
The Star-Ledger/Eagleton	May 18–26, 1988	611 LV	±4.0%	45%	28%	27%
The Star-Ledger/Eagleton	May 18–26, 1988	611 LV	±4.0%	51%	33%	16%
The Star-Ledger/Eagleton	September 16–22, 1988	765 LV	±3.5%	48%	28%	24%
The Star-Ledger/Eagleton	September 16–22, 1988	765 LV	±3.5%	53%	32%	16%
The Star-Ledger/Eagleton	October 17–25, 1988	774 RV	±3.5%	46%	34%	10%
The Star-Ledger/Eagleton	October 17–25, 1988	774 RV	±3.5%	50%	38%	12%
The Star-Ledger/Eagleton	October 17–25, 1988	627 LV	±4.0%	47%	35%	18%
The Star-Ledger/Eagleton	October 17–25, 1988	627 LV	±4.0%	50%	39%	11%
The Star-Ledger/Eagleton	November 3–6, 1988	1,183 RV	±2.9%	46%	35%	19%
The Star-Ledger/Eagleton	November 3–6, 1988	1,183 RV	±2.9%	49%	38%	13%
The Star-Ledger/Eagleton	November 3–6, 1988	954 LV	±3.3%	48%	36%	16%
The Star-Ledger/Eagleton	November 3–6, 1988	954 LV	±3.3%	51%	39%	10%

=== Results ===
United States Senate election in New Jersey, 1988
Party	Candidate	Votes	%	±%
Democratic	Frank Lautenberg (incumbent)	1,599,905	53.55%	▲2.61
Republican	Pete Dawkins	1,349,937	45.18%	▼2.57
Independent	Joseph F. Job	20,091	0.67%	N/A
Libertarian	Jerry Zeldin	12,354	0.41%	▼0.04
Socialist Workers	Thomas A. Fiske	5,347	0.18%	▲0.01
Majority		249,968	8.37%	
Total votes		2,987,634	100.00%	
Democratic hold				

==== By county ====
County	Frank Lautenberg Democratic		Pete Dawkins Republican		Other parties	
County	%	#	%	#	%	#
Atlantic	54.7%	41,004	44.6%	33,417	0.7%	493
Bergen	52.6%	199,195	45.5%	172,257	1.9%	7,291
Burlington	52.0%	75,513	47.3%	68,657	0.6%	929
Camden	59.1%	110,718	40.1%	75,162	0.8%	1,438
Cape May	46.6%	19,720	52.8%	22,349	0.5%	223
Cumberland	55.4%	25,379	42.9%	19,680	1.7%	771
Essex	65.0%	170,591	32.4%	85,169	2.6%	6,855
Gloucester	53.4%	46,247	42.9%	39,232	1.7%	1,055
Hudson	61.7%	108,355	37.0%	65,092	1.3%	2,270
Hunterdon	41.1%	18,281	57.6%	25,615	1.2%	544
Mercer	61.8%	80,569	37.7%	49,122	0.6%	724
Middlesex	55.1%	141,067	43.8%	112,182	1.1%	2,796
Monmouth	50.8%	117,063	48.3%	111,318	0.8%	1,906
Morris	43.0%	79,237	56.4%	103,843	0.6%	1,057
Ocean	46.0%	84,812	53.2%	98,161	0.8%	1,512
Passaic	52.7%	77,827	45.0%	66,440	2.4%	3,512
Salem	48.8%	12,485	49.1%	12,562	2.1%	534
Somerset	46.4%	47,648	52.5%	53,969	1.1%	1,138
Sussex	38.4%	19,035	60.4%	29,909	1.2%	613
Union	55.0%	109,852	44.1%	88,027	0.9%	1,775
Warren	45.8%	15,307	53.2%	17,774	1.1%	356

Counties that flipped from Republican to Democratic

- Monomuth
- Bergen
- Burlington

Counties that flipped from Democratic to Republican

- Salem

== See also ==
- 1988 United States Senate elections
