= Jackson–Vanik amendment =

1974 trade provision in US federal law

The Jackson–Vanik amendment to the Trade Act of 1974 is a 1974 provision in United States federal law intended to affect U.S. trade relations with countries with non-market economies (originally, countries of the Soviet Bloc) that restricted freedom of emigration and other human rights. The amendment is contained in the Trade Act of 1974 which passed both houses of the United States Congress unanimously, and was signed by President Gerald Ford into law, with the adopted amendment, on January 3, 1975. Over time, a number of countries were granted conditional normal trade relations subject to annual review, and a number of countries were liberated from the amendment.

On December 14, 2012, President Barack Obama signed the Magnitsky Act (formally titled the Russia and Moldova Jackson–Vanik Repeal and Sergei Magnitsky Rule of Law Accountability Act of 2012) that repealed the application of the Jackson–Vanik amendment to Russia and gave normal US trade relations to Russia and Moldova, instead punishing individuals violating human rights.

The amendment is named after its major co-sponsors Henry M. Jackson of Washington in the Senate and Charles A. Vanik of Ohio in the House of Representatives, both Democrats.

== Background ==
=== Soviet Emigration Policy ===
Emigration from the Soviet Bloc was severely restricted for all citizens, regardless of nationality, ethnicity or religion.

Jews were among a small number of minorities that enjoyed an exception to this rule.

=== Timeline ===
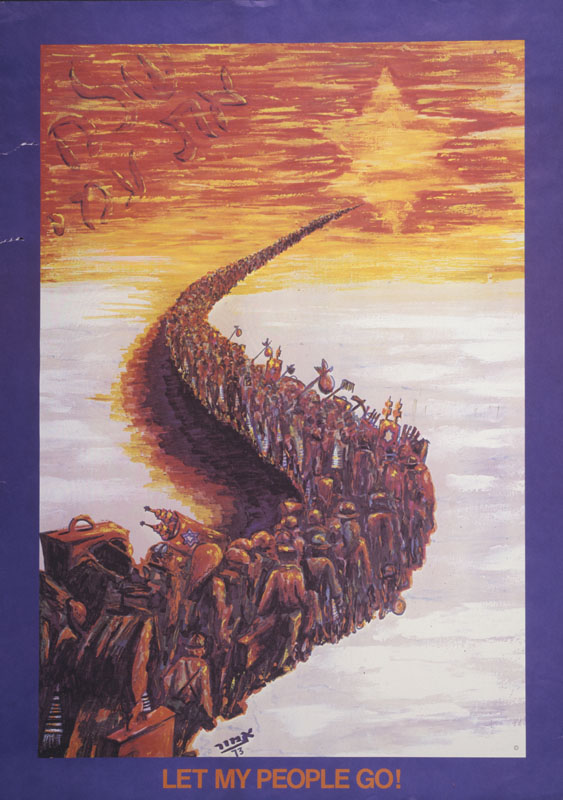
Painting illustrating the desire of Soviet Jews to exile themselves to Israel (1973): Let my people go!

From 1972 to January 1975, Congress debated and added the Jackson-Vanik Amendment to the Trade Act of 1974, which had restricted the president's ability to provide most favored nation (MFN) status to the Soviet Union and other non-market economies of the Soviet bloc. The timing and provisions of the amendment reflected the presidential ambitions and distrust of the Soviet Union of Senator Henry Jackson (D-WA).

After the Soviet Union allowed a number of Soviet Jews to emigrate in the years after the 1967 June War in the Middle East, expectations of freer emigration to buttress Jewish settlers to Israel were raised, but they were soon shattered as the 1972 Soviet emigration head tax made emigration very difficult.

This Soviet edict levied an additional exit tax on educated emigrants, which was felt most significantly by Jews who were provided with state-funded education and housing. The education tax, imposed after the 1972 Moscow summit of superpower leaders Richard Nixon and Leonid Brezhnev, emboldened those who criticized the Nixon administration's policy of detente for downplaying concerns for human rights. Nixon's handling of the issue of Soviet Jewish emigration and US National Security Advisor Henry Kissinger's reluctance to broach the subject disappointed US Jewish activists. The Soviets announced the abolition of the tax just before the introduction of the amendment in Congress, arguably in an attempt to halt its enactment.

At first, Jackson organized the political movement to link trade and emigration in US relations with the Soviet Union in concert with Jewish activists, but he soon took matters into his own hands. Jackson drafted what would become the Jackson–Vanik amendment in mid-1972 and introduced it to the 92nd Congress on October 4, 1972. Jackson's efforts, rooted in his own domestic political agenda and ideological distrust of and antipathy toward the Soviet Union, complicated the Nixon White House's pursuit of detente, which it had worked on since 1969. However, three-quarters of the Senate co-sponsored the amendment, neutralizing opposition from President Nixon.

Jackson's staffer Richard Perle said in an interview that the idea belonged to Jackson, who believed that the right to emigrate was the most powerful among the human rights in certain respects: "if people could vote with their feet, governments would have to acknowledge that and governments would have to make for their citizens a life that would keep them there." While there was some opposition, the American Jewish establishment on the whole and Soviet Jewry activists (particularly the Washington Committee for Soviet Jewry and the National Conference on Soviet Jewry) supported the amendment over Nixon's and Kissinger's objections.

In 1973 Rep. Charles Vanik, chair of the House Ways and Means Subcommittee on Trade, introduced in the House of Representatives the legislation drafted with Jackson. The amendment would deny normal trade relations to certain countries with non-market economies that restricted freedom of emigration. The amendment was intended to allow primarily Jewish refugees and other religious minorities to escape from the Soviet bloc. Vanik's aide, Mark E. Talisman, is regarded as having played an instrumental role in securing passage.

Jackson attached his amendment to legislation the Nixon administration badly wanted. In the House of Representatives, Vanik lined up House leaders as primary sponsors of the amendment. During this period, Jackson also expanded his base of support, adding other ethnic, economic, and ideological groups as supporters. Labor, ethnic groups originally from Eastern European and Baltic States, human rights organizations and liberal intellectuals were the most significant additions to organized labor and Jewish activists. While building support, Jackson resisted compromise with the administration and the Soviet Union.

Once the Nixon administration began to appreciate the threat Jackson presented its policy of detente, and in particular the linkage of detente to expanded trade, it made a number of attempts to thwart Jackson. The administration tried to keep the amendment out of the committee version of the bill during the House Ways and Means Committee's markup sessions. When it became clear that this was impossible, delay was the administration's next option, along with the threat of a veto.

The Yom Kippur War in October 1973 further complicated Congressional views of the Soviet Union. Soviet involvement in the conflict may have stoked distrust of the USSR by some members of Congress, but there were other members who feared that pressure on the Nixon Administration to advance the goals of the Jackson–Vanik amendment complicated the emergency supply of US military weapons to Israel. Israel prevailed in the Yom Kippur War, and on December 11 the House of Representatives voted by an overwhelming 319–80 vote to include the entire Jackson–Vanik amendment in the trade bill, which passed 272–140. With that, Congress recessed until January 1974.

On January 21, 1974, the second session of the 93rd United States Congress began, and the Jackson amendment was introduced in the Senate. Having lost the legislative battle in the House of Representatives, the administration and Soviet authorities turned to negotiations with Jackson. Trilateral talks began in spring 1974 involving Congress, the Executive Branch and the Soviet Union. The prominent individuals involved were Jackson, Kissinger, and Soviet Ambassador to the U.S. Anatoly Dobrynin, a skilled senior diplomat who had served in Washington for decades. Kissinger enjoyed a special status in these negotiations since he alone controlled the communications between Jackson and the Soviet Union. In effect, Kissinger was the only one of the three parties involved who knew what all sides were saying in secret, informal sessions, while he also conducted a long-standing "back channel" dialogue with Soviet authorities via Dobrynin. Kissinger's influence only grew as Nixon was increasingly consumed by the Watergate political scandal.

In March 1974, Kissinger returned from Moscow with news that the Soviets were willing to cooperate with the members of Congress. Jackson, however, would complicate matters by making public the demands that had been accommodated in quiet diplomatic dialogue.

Jackson pursued negotiations with the administration and the Soviet Union on the terms of the amendment. The outline of an agreement was perceivable, but by summer the talks seemed to bog down as Watergate sapped the Executive Branch's political energy. Nixon resigned on August 9, 1974.

In August 1974, when the national deadlock was broken by Nixon's resignation and Ford's appointment, Jackson had to decide whether or not to concur with an agreement that was not perfect or hold out longer and possibly sink the entire trade bill. Given the choice of having the bill with the Jackson amendment or doing away with both the bill and the Jackson amendment together, Kissinger was apparently willing to let the two die. So to compromise, Jackson had agreed to grant, at least temporarily, trade concessions, including extensions of credit, to the Soviet Union.

Eventually, Jackson accepted less than perfect terms. Jackson was anxious to achieve a legislative victory after years of battle and apparently decided it best not to ask too many more questions nor press too hard for less ambiguous pledges lest he be left with nothing to show for his efforts.

President Ford signed the 1972 Trade Agreement on January 3, 1975, with the Jackson amendment. On January 10, the Soviet government sent a letter that apparently indicated the Soviets' refusal to comply with the need to provide assurances on emigration or to make technical changes in the 1972 Trade Agreement. On January 13, Kissinger met with Soviet officials and subsequently issued a statement "that the 1972 Trade Agreement cannot be brought into force at this time and the President will therefore not take the steps required for this purpose by the Trade Agreement. The President does not plan at this time to exercise the waiver authority."

=== Business involvement ===
Harry Stone, vice president and his brother, Irving Stone, president of American Greetings based in Vanick's home town, Cleveland, Ohio, played a major role in gaining sponsorship for the amendment. Harry Stone served as campaign chairman to the late U.S. Representative Charles Vanik, a connection that gained significance when Vanik asked Stone and his brother Irving, then American Greetings president, to encourage congressman Wilbur Mills to schedule a floor vote on the Jackson-Vanik Amendment requiring the Soviet Union to allow Jewish emigration to the U.S. in order to qualify for "most favored nation status" for its exports. Senator J. William Fulbright, chair of the Senate Foreign Relations Committee characterized the amendment as "idealistic meddling" in the amendment's attempts to use free Jews using trade and credit as levers against the Soviet Union. American Greetings was the largest employer in Mills's Arkansas district. Fulbright, apparently saw the same light as Mills, as American Greetings opened one of its largest printing plants in Fulbright's and Mills's state of Arkansas.

"The role that Harry Stone played in making the Jackson-Vanik bill a reality will go down as one of the most meaningful contributions that a Clevelander has ever made," says Vic Gelb, an honorary for life director of the Cleveland Jewish News. "It made a world of difference in the history of events and enabled the exodus of Jews from the former Soviet Union."

=== Conclusion ===
The difficulty faced by Senator Jackson in the three-way negotiation process that took place from August 1974 through January 1975, demonstrated some of the institutional constraints on congressional involvement in foreign policy making. The Jackson–Vanik amendment is a case study of how domestic politics shapes American Foreign policy making. It exemplifies the fact that one cannot understand U.S. foreign policy if one does not understand the domestic politics in Congress and the White House that shape policy decisions.

== Content ==
The amendment denied most favored nation status to certain countries with non-market economies that restricted emigration, which is considered a human right. Permanent normal trade relations can have been extended to such country only if the president determined that it complies with the freedom of emigration requirements. However, the president had authority to grant an annual waiver, which was granted to the People's Republic of China in the late 1970s and to Vietnam and Laos in later decades.

The core provision of the amendment was codified as 19 U.S.C. 2432(a), Sec. 402 "Freedom of Emigration in East-West Trade" of the Trade Act of 1974 (Pub. L. 93–618, 88 Stat. 1978):

(a) Actions of nonmarket economy countries making them ineligible for normal trade relations, programs of credits, credit guarantees, or investment guarantees, or commercial agreements To assure the continued dedication of the United States to fundamental human rights, and notwithstanding any other provision of law, on or after January 3, 1975, products from any nonmarket economy country shall not be eligible to receive nondiscriminatory treatment (normal trade relations), such country shall not participate in any program of the Government of the United States which extends credits or credit guarantees or investment guarantees, directly or indirectly, and the President of the United States shall not conclude any commercial agreement with any such country, during the period beginning with the date on which the President determines that such country -

(1) denies its citizens the right or opportunity to emigrate;
(2) imposes more than a nominal tax on emigration or on the visas or other documents required for emigration, for any purpose or cause whatsoever; or
(3) imposes more than a nominal tax, levy, fine, fee, or other charge on any citizen as a consequence of the desire of such citizen to emigrate to the country of his choice,

and ending on the date on which the President determines that such country is no longer in violation of paragraph (1), (2), or (3).

== Effects ==
The countries subject to the amendment included the Soviet Union (and later the post-Soviet states), the People's Republic of China, Romania, Hungary, Czechoslovakia, East Germany, Bulgaria, Mongolia, Albania, Cambodia, Laos, and Vietnam.

Of Soviet Bloc countries, Poland was exempt from the amendment, but from 1982 to 1987 its unconditional MFN status was suspended due to its actions against Solidarność. Yugoslavia was also exempt; however, in 1991–1992, due to violent events in the former Yugoslavia, the MFN status of Serbia and Montenegro was suspended.

=== Soviet Union ===
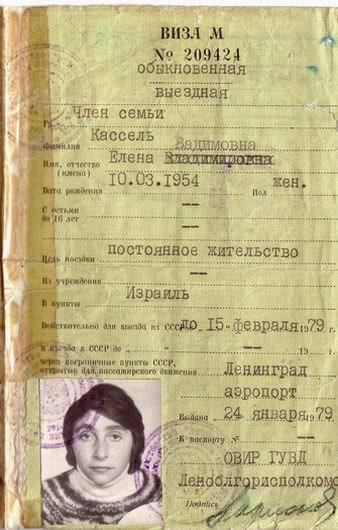
Exit USSR visa of the type 2. For those who received permission to leave the USSR permanently and lost Soviet citizenship. Not all were able to receive this kind of exit visa

At first the Jackson–Vanik amendment did little to help free Soviet Jewry. The number of exit visas declined after the passing of the amendment. However, in the late 1980s Mikhail Gorbachev agreed to comply with the protocols of the Organization for Security and Cooperation in Europe. Lazin (2005) states that scholars differ on how effective the amendment was in helping Soviet Jews. Some argue that it helped bring the plight of Soviet Jews to the world's attention, while others believe it hindered emigration and decreased America's diplomatic bargaining power.

Since 1975 more than 500,000 refugees, large numbers of whom were Jews, evangelical Christians, and Catholics from the former Soviet Union, have been resettled in the United States. An estimated one million Soviet Jews have immigrated to Israel in that time.

Jackson–Vanik also led to great changes within the Soviet Union. Other ethnic groups subsequently demanded the right to emigrate, and the ruling Communist Party had to face the fact that there was widespread dissatisfaction with its governance.

Former Soviet dissident Natan Sharansky wrote in his 2004 book The Case for Democracy (p. 3):

... Kissinger saw Jackson's amendment as an attempt to undermine plans to smoothly carve up the geopolitical pie between the superpowers. It was. Jackson believed that the Soviets had to be confronted, not appeased. Andrei Sakharov was another vociferous opponent of détente. He thought it swept the Soviet's human rights record under the rug in the name of improved superpower relations. ... One message he would consistently convey to these foreigners (the press) was that human rights must never be considered a humanitarian issue alone. For him, it was also a matter of international security. As he succinctly put it: "A country that does not respect the rights of its own people will not respect the rights of its neighbors."

=== Lautenberg Amendment (1990) ===
After Boris Perchatkin’s speeches in the US Congress in 1989 Frank Lautenberg suggested the Lautenberg Amendment, Public Law 101–167, enacted on November 21, 1989, took effect in 1990 which provided refugee status in the United States for nationals from the Soviet Union and later the former Soviet Union, Ukraine, Estonia, Latvia or Lithuania who are Jews, Evangelical Christians, Ukrainian Catholics or Ukrainian Orthodox; as well as nationals of Vietnam, Laos, or Cambodia; and Jews, Christians, Baha’is and other religious minorities from Iran. The Lautenberg measure allowed refugee status to people from historically persecuted groups without requiring them to show that they had been singled out. Under the Lautenberg Amendment, 350,000 to 400,000 Jews from the former Soviet Union who had not presented any form of evidence of persecution gained entry to the United States by October 2002 according to the Jewish Telegraphic Agency. Beginning in 2002, a special "Refugee Corps" in the Department of Homeland Security handled issues involving the Lautenberg Amendment.

=== Post-soviet states ===
==== Baltic states: Estonia, Latvia and Lithuania ====
Estonia, Latvia and Lithuania were subject to the amendment because they had been forcibly incorporated into the Soviet Union. They were liberated from the amendment upon the US recognition of their independence on September 6, 1991.

==== Kazakhstan ====
Kazakhstan's Jewish community reportedly requested the US to cancel Jackson Vanik amendment for Kazakhstan. In an article titled "A Relic of the Cold War", journalist Robert Guttman refers to the Amendment as an "outdated and rather meaningless piece of legislation". The U.S. Chamber of Commerce argues that the application of Jackson-Vanik on Kazakhstan puts U.S. companies at a competitive disadvantage. The Chamber urges the U.S. Congress to graduate Kazakhstan from Jackson-Vanik.

==== Kyrgyzstan ====
Kyrgyzstan first received conditional normal trade relations in 1992. In 1997 it was found fully compliant with the Jackson-Vanik provisions, but its status remained subject to annual review. On May 18, 2000, Public Law 106-200 authorized the President to extend unconditional normal trade relations to Kyrgyzstan.

==== Moldova ====
Moldova first received conditional normal trade relations in 1992. In 1997 it was found to be fully compliant with the Jackson-Vanik provisions, but its status remained subject to annual review.

On November 16, 2012, the U.S. House of Representatives passed a bill that would repeal the Jackson–Vanik amendment for Russia and Moldova. After approval by the Senate, the law repealing the effects of the Jackson–Vanik amendment on Russia and Moldova was signed by President Barack Obama on December 14, 2012.

==== Russia ====
In 2003, Vladimir Putin pursued an economic agenda for Russia to begin normalized trade relations with the West which included Russia joining the European Union and the repeal of the Jackson–Vanik amendment. Putin tried to use his relationships with both the Italian Prime Minister Silvio Berlusconi, who was the head of the European Union's Council in 2003, to gain Russia's membership in the European Union, and also Hank Greenberg, who was the chairman and CEO of the American International Group (AIG), to repeal the Jackson-Vanik provisions in the United States. Putin wished for Greenberg to support through Greenberg's AIG greater development of the nascent Russian home-mortgage market.

On November 16, 2012, the U.S. House of Representatives passed a bill that would repeal the Jackson–Vanik amendment for Russia and Moldova. After approval by the Senate, the law repealing the effects of the Jackson–Vanik amendment on Russia and Moldova was signed together with Magnitsky bill by President Barack Obama on December 14, 2012.

==== Ukraine ====
On March 8, 2006, the U.S. House of Representatives passed a bill permanently exempting Ukraine from trade restrictions imposed under the 1974 Jackson–Vanik amendment.

=== China ===
Until the accession of China to the World Trade Organization in December 2001 China was covered by the provisions of Jackson-Vanik. Before China's crackdown on the Tiananmen protests of 1989, a waiver was granted to China as a routine matter. After the crackdown, the waiver became a more contentious issue. As part of the 2001 WTO entry agreement for China, China received permanent normal trade relations and the Jackson–Vanik amendment no longer applied.

== U.S. legal challenge ==
In April 2011, American University in Moscow professor Eduard Lozansky and former Reagan administration official Antony Salvia filed a federal lawsuit in Washington, D.C. against the Obama administration arguing the law is illegal.

== See also ==
- Soviet Jewry movement
- Aliyah from the Soviet Union in the 1970s
- Migration diplomacy
- Refugees as weapons
- Refusenik
  - Jewish emigration from Communist Romania

== Sources ==
- Stern, Paula (1979). Water's edge : domestic politics and the making of American foreign policy. Westport, Conn.: Greenwood Press. ISBN 978-0313205200.
- Ostrovskaya, O.P. (23 June 2017). Судьбы участников эмиграционного движения пятидесятников на дальнем востоке в 1970-1980-х гг. [The fate of participants in the Pentecostal emigration movement in the Far East in the 1970s-1980s.]. In S.M. Dudarionok; M.A. Tuliglovich (eds.). Владивосток – точка возвращения: прошлое и настоящее русской эмиграции. Материалы Второй международной научной конференции [Vladivostok – the point of return: past and present of Russian emigration. Proceedings of the Second International Scientific Conference] (PDF) (Digest of articles) (in Russian). Khabarovsk: Дальневосточный юридический институт Министерства внутренних дел Российской Федерации. ISBN 978-5-9753-0229-8. Archived from the original (PDF) on 26 September 2023.
- Gura, V.O. (2018). Andruschenko Viktor Petrovich (ed.). Історія та есхатологічні мотиви релігійної еміграції пізніх протестантів із СРСР 1987–2017 рр. [History and eschatological motives of the religious emigration of late Protestants from the USSR 1987–2017.] (PDF). Гілея: науковий вісник (in Ukrainian) (135). Kyiv: 171–175. ISSN 2076-1554.
- Semyonova, Victoria (2020-01-03). Борис Перчаткин — о том, как помогал верующим из СССР попасть в США [Boris Perchatkin - how he helped believers from the USSR get to the USA]. usa.one (in Russian).
