= Donald Cresitello =

American politician

Mayor of Morristown, New Jersey
- In office 2006 – January 1, 2010
- Succeeded by: Tim Dougherty
- In office 1977–1981
- Preceded by: David Manahan

Personal details
- Party: Democratic
- Other political affiliations: Republican (1997)

Donald Cresitello is an American politician who served as the mayor of Morristown, New Jersey, from 1977 to 1981 and again from 2006 to 2010.

== Career ==
=== Campaigns for United States Senate ===
Cresitello launched a campaign for 1982 United States Senate election in New Jersey. He dropped out of the race on May 27 but remained on the June 8 Democratic primary ballot.

Cresitello again ran in Democratic primary for the 2008 United States Senate election in New Jersey against incumbent Senator Frank Lautenberg and U.S. representative Rob Andrews. He garnered 19,743 votes, or 5.7 percent of those cast in a field of three.

=== Mayor ===
In 1997 Cresitillo switched to the Republican party but lost the mayoral primary to Jay Delaney.

He went on to win the Morristown mayoral election against Scott Whitenack in 2005.

On June 2, 2009 Cresitello lost a Democratic primary challenge from Morristown's zoning board chairman Tim Dougherty.

=== Freeholder ===
In 2013 Cresitillo ran in the primary for Freeholder of Morris County. He did not expect to win since voters normally elect Republicans to the Board.

=== Immigration policy ===
Cresitello gained national attention in a controversy regarding Immigration reduction in the United States and use of Immigration and Nationality Act Section 287(g). He had been active in reducing the presence of illegal immigrants in Morristown. He attempted to have police officers deputized as immigration officers. He asked federal authorities to assist local police in cracking down on illegal immigration in the town and on employers that hired illegal immigrants. He wrote a letter to then-United States attorney Chris Christie in this effort. In 2007, a rally at which he spoke saw violence and arrests.
