= Frank R. Lautenberg Deep-Sea Coral Protection Area =

Frank R. Lautenberg Deep-Sea Coral Protection Area is an offshore marine protected area for deep-sea corals off the coast of the Mid-Atlantic states of the United States.

On September 26, 2016, the National Oceanic and Atmospheric Administration (NOAA) Fisheries and the Mid-Atlantic Fishery Management Council proposed a final rule to designate a large offshore protected area for deep-sea corals in the Mid-Atlantic. The rule took effect on January 13, 2017. The final rule was named in honor of Senator Frank Lautenberg, a U.S. Senator from New Jersey responsible for many ocean conservation policies.

== Location ==
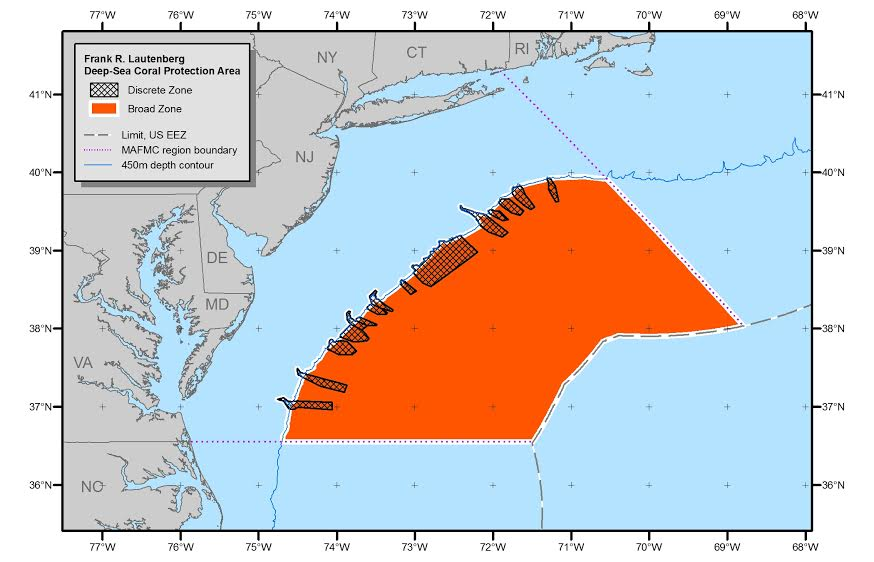
Boundary of the Senator Lautenberg Deepsea Coral Protection Act

Targeted areas include areas of known or highly likely coral presence in underwater canyons or slope areas along the edge of the continental shelf of the United States. The deep-sea coral protection area includes the continental shelf/slope break off the Mid-Atlantic states (New York to North Carolina) to the border of the U.S.'s Exclusive Economic Zone. It starts at a depth of approximately 450 m, and encompasses 15 discrete zones. The area covers 38,000 square miles of federal waters, approximately the same size of Virginia. According to the Natural Resources Defense Council, the environmental advocacy group, it is the "largest area in the U.S. Atlantic and Gulf of Mexico protected from a range of destructive fishing gear."

== Regulation ==
Prohibited gear includes bottom tending otter trawls, beam trawls, hydraulic dredges, non-hydraulic dredges, seines, longlines, pots and traps, and sink or gill nets. The rule does not apply to recreational fishing, commercial gear types that do not contact the seafloor, or the American lobster trap fishery and the deep sea red crab commercial trap fishery. Vessels may transit through the area if fishing gear is stowed and not available for immediate use.

Requires that vessels issued an Illex squid moratorium permit have a vessel monitoring system (VMS) installed, and operators of these vessels have to declare Illex squid trips on which 10,000 lb or more of Illex squid would be harvested.

== History ==
This act is in accordance with NOAA’s National Marine Fisheries Service approval of Amendment 16 to the Atlantic Mackerel, Squid, and Butterfish Fishery Management Plan (FMP) to protect deep-sea corals from the potential harm of commercial fishing gear. It also follows the central dogma of the Magnuson-Stevens Fishery Conservation and Management Act to promote optimal exploitation of U.S. coastal fisheries in line with sustainability policies.

The Regional Fishery Management Councils has the authority to:

(A) Designate zones where, and periods when, fishing shall be limited, or shall not be permitted, or shall be permitted only by specified types of fishing vessels or with specified types and quantities of fishing gear;
(B) Designate such zones in areas where deep-sea corals are identified under section 408 (this section describes the deep-sea coral research and technology program), to protect deep-sea corals from physical damage from fishing gear or to prevent loss or damage to such fishing gear from interactions with deep-sea corals, after considering long-term sustainable uses of fishery resources in such areas; and
(C) With respect to any closure of an area under the Magnuson-Stevens Act that prohibits all fishing, ensure that such closure:

(i) Is based on the best scientific information available;
(ii) Includes criteria to assess the conservation benefit of the closed area;
(iii) Establishes a timetable for review of the closed area's performance that is consistent with the purposes of the closed area; and
(iv) Is based on an assessment of the benefits and impacts of the closure, including its size, in relation to other management measures (either alone or in combination with such measures), including the benefits and impacts of limiting access to: Users of the area, overall fishing activity, fishery science, and fishery and marine conservation.
