= Consumer First Energy Act of 2008 =

The Consumer First Energy Act of 2008 (S. 3044) is a set of initiatives laid out by the US Democratic Party on Wednesday May 7, 2008. The plan was first mentioned by House Speaker Nancy Pelosi on April 27, 2006. The few details that have been released include:

- A 25% windfall profit tax on any energy company that didn't invest in new energy sources.
- End $17 billion in tax breaks to energy companies.
- Prevent the Dept of Energy from adding to the Strategic Petroleum Reserve until the price of crude oil averaged under $75 for 90 days.
- Require the CFTC to boost Margin requirements for Oil futures.

The bill was debated on 5 June 2008, and filibustered in the Senate on 10 June 2008
