= Pete Dawkins =

United States Army general

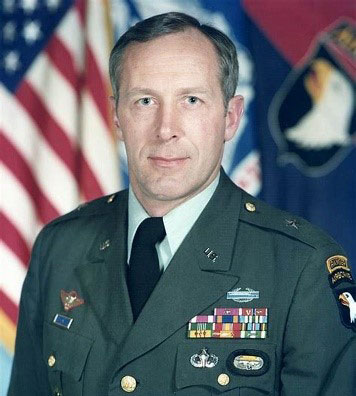
- Dawkins c. 1983

Personal details
- Born: March 8, 1938 (age 88) Royal Oak, Michigan, U.S.
- Party: Republican
- Spouses: Judi Wright (m. 1962; died 2017) Mary M. Ourisman (m. 2019)
- Education: United States Military Academy (BS); Brasenose College, Oxford (BA); Princeton University (MPA, PhD)
- Website: www.petedawkins.com

Military service
- Allegiance: United States of America
- Branch/service: United States Army
- Years of service: 1962–1983
- Rank: Brigadier general
- Battles/wars: Vietnam War
- Awards: Bronze Star (2)
- Football career

No. 24
- Position: Halfback

Personal information
- Listed height: 6 ft 1 in (1.85 m)
- Listed weight: 210 lb (95 kg)

Career information
- High school: Cranbrook (Bloomfield Hills, Michigan)
- College: Army (1956–1958)

Awards and highlights
- 2× Eastern champion (1956, 1958); Heisman Trophy (1958); Maxwell Award (1958); Unanimous All-American (1958); 2× First-team All-Eastern (1957, 1958); Army Black Knights No. 24 retired
- College Football Hall of Fame (Class of 1975)

Peter Miller Dawkins (born March 8, 1938) is an American business executive and former college football player, hockey player, military officer, and political candidate. Dawkins attended the United States Military Academy, where he played as a halfback for the Army Cadets football team from 1956 to 1958. As a senior in 1958 he won the Heisman Trophy, the Maxwell Award, and was named as a consensus All-American. After graduating from the Military Academy in 1959, he studied at the University of Oxford as a Rhodes Scholar. Dawkins served as an officer in the United States Army until he retired in 1983 with the rank of brigadier general. He received the Golden Plate Award of the American Academy of Achievement presented by Awards Council member and Supreme Allied Commander Europe, General Bernard W. Rogers, USA in 1983. He was a Republican candidate for United States Senate in 1988. Dawkins has held executive positions with Lehman Brothers, Bain & Company, Primerica, and Citigroup.

He is the only person in history to have held the titles of Brigade Commander, Football Team Captain, Class President, Star Man (top 5% of the class), Heisman Trophy winner, Oxford University Rugby Blue and Rhodes Scholar. He is often regarded as the most decorated cadet in the history of the United States Military Academy.

Following Johnny Lujack's death on July 25, 2023, Dawkins is the oldest surviving winner of the Heisman Trophy. He is the lone survivor among the first 27 recipients (1935–1961).

Dawkins at North all-star practice in Miami on December 21, 1958

== Early life, education and athletic career ==
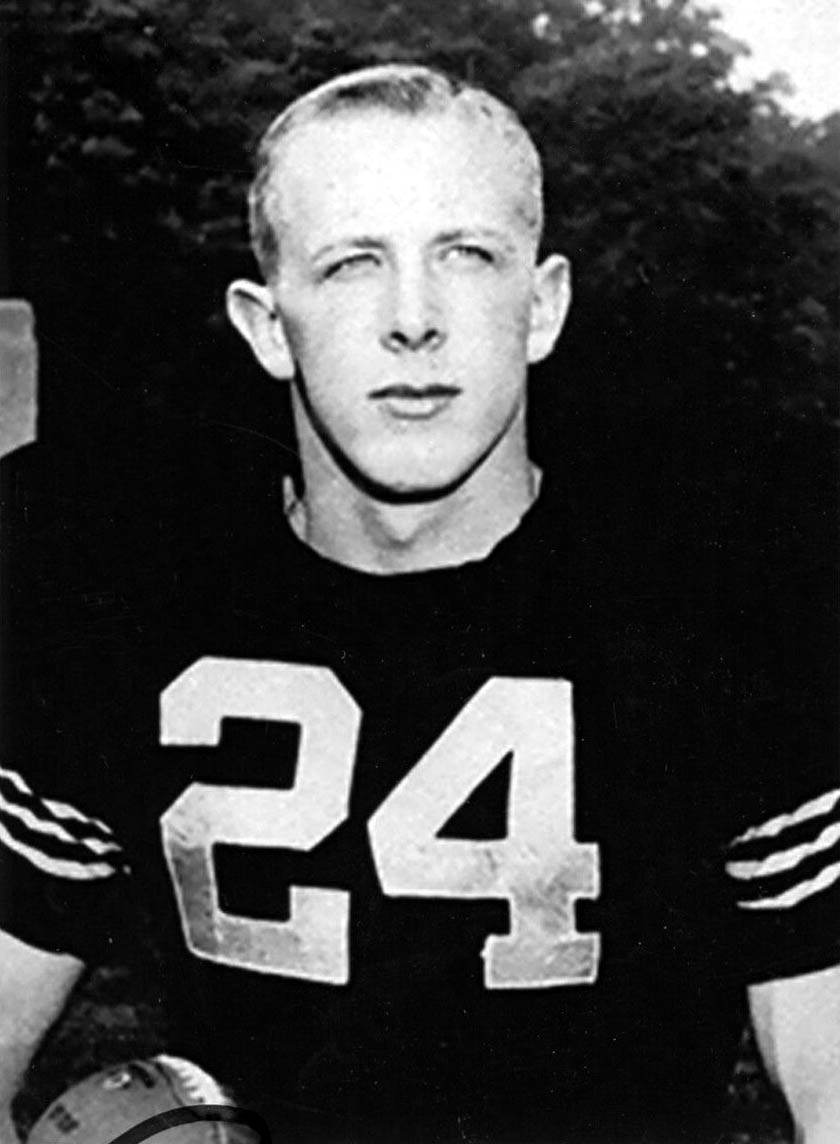
Dawkins with Army in 1958

At age 11, Dawkins was successfully treated for polio with aggressive physical therapy. After earning a scholarship, Dawkins entered Cranbrook School in Bloomfield Hills, Michigan. There he was an all-league quarterback, and captain of the baseball team. He graduated from Cranbrook in 1955.

Accepted by Yale University, Dawkins chose instead to attend the United States Military Academy at West Point. He earned high honors, serving as First Captain, president of his class, captain of the football team, and a "Star Man" in the top five percent of his class academically. A cadet is considered outstanding if he attains one of these positions. Dawkins was the only cadet in history to hold all four at once. He was featured in Life Magazine and Reader's Digest. Even before his graduation, many predicted he would make general and perhaps even be Army Chief of Staff. Dawkins began his playing career at West Point under head football coach Earl Blaik as a fourth-string quarterback before being cut from the position. Later playing as a halfback during his junior and senior season, Dawkins saw great success and eventually won the Heisman Trophy and the Maxwell Award and was a consensus All-America selection in 1958. Dawkins was also an assistant captain for the hockey team. At Oxford, he won three Blues in rugby union and is credited with popularizing the overarm throw (originally called the "Yankee torpedo pass") into the lineout.

Dawkins graduated with a BSc from the Military Academy in 1959 with a very high class standing, and was awarded a Rhodes Scholarship. During his time at Oxford he earned three Rugby Uion Blues. He earned a BA at Brasenose College, Oxford in 1962 in Philosophy, Politics, and Economics (promoted to an MA in 1968, per tradition) and later earned a Master of Public Affairs in 1970 and a PhD in 1977 from the Woodrow Wilson School of Public and International Affairs at Princeton University with the dissertation The United States Army and the "Other" War in Vietnam: A Study of the Complexity of Implementing Organizational Change.

== Military career ==
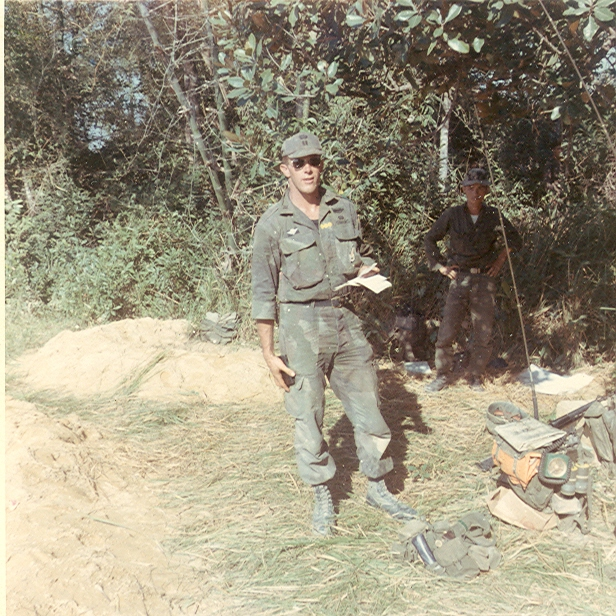
CPT Pete Dawkins in Vietnam, March 1966

After being commissioned from the academy and completing his tenure as a Rhodes Scholar, Dawkins finished Infantry School and Ranger School before being posted for duty in the 82nd Airborne Division. He received two Bronze Stars for Valor for his service in Vietnam and held commands in the 7th Infantry Division and 101st Airborne. From 1971 to 1972, Dawkins, while a lieutenant colonel, was the commander of the 1st Battalion 23rd Infantry, 2nd Infantry Division, Camp Hovey, Korea. In addition to being an instructor at the academy, he was a White House Fellow in the 1973–74 class. During that time, he was chosen to work on a task force, charged with changing the U.S. Army into an all-volunteer force. During the mid-1970s Colonel Dawkins was brigade commander of the 3rd ( "Golden Brigade") of the 82nd Airborne Division at Fort Bragg, North Carolina that included the 1st and 2nd 505th and 1/508th battalions. In the late 1970s he was 3rd Brigade Commander (War Eagle Brigade, which included the 1/503, 2/503, and 3/187 Infantry Battalions) of the 101st Airborne Division (Air Assault) at Fort Campbell with the rank of colonel. After serving as the Brigade Commander he became the Chief of Staff for the 101st Airborne Division and was subsequently promoted to brigadier general. In 1966 Dawkins appeared in uniform on the cover of Life Magazine and participated in a segment of the U.S. Army "Big Picture" film series, "A Nation Builds Under Fire." This was a short documentary reviewing United States progress in South Vietnam, narrated by actor John Wayne.

== Business career ==
At the conclusion of his 24-year career in the Army, Dawkins retired with the rank of brigadier general in 1983. Following his retirement from the Army, Dawkins took up a position as a partner in the Wall Street firm Lehman Brothers, later becoming vice-chairman of Bain & Company. In 1991, he moved on to become chairman and CEO of Primerica. Dawkins was a senior partner at Flintlock Capital Asset Management and is currently a senior advisor for Virtu Financial.

== Political career ==
Sometime before April 1987, Dawkins established residence in Rumson, New Jersey. He ran for the U.S. Senate as a Republican against New Jersey's incumbent Democratic U.S. Senator, Frank Lautenberg, in 1988. The race was notable for the negative tone that emerged from both sides and for Lautenberg's criticism of Dawkins's lack of roots in the state. Dawkins lost in the general election by an eight-point margin.

=== Electoral history ===
External image
- Pete Dawkins on the cover of Life Magazine published on April 8, 1966. Displayed at Cover Browser.

- United States Senate election in New Jersey, 1988
  - Frank Lautenberg (D) (inc.), 53.55%
  - Pete Dawkins (R), 45.18%

Party political offices
Preceded by Millicent Fenwick	Republican nominee for U.S. Senator from New Jersey (Class 1); 1988	Succeeded by Chuck Haytaian
