= Mayor of Morristown, New Jersey =

This is a list of people who have served as mayor of Morristown, New Jersey.

- Timothy P. Dougherty, 2010–present
- Donald Cresitello, 2006–2010
- Jay DeLaney, 1998–2006
- Norman Bloch, 1990–1997
- David Manahan, 1986–1989
- Emilio J. Gervasio, 1982–1985
- Donald Cresitello, 1977–1981
- David Manahan, 1974–1977
- Emilio J. Gervasio, 1973
- Anthony J Cattano Sr., 1971–1972
- Victor L. Woodhull, 1967–1970
- E. Marco Stirone, 1965–1966
- J. Raymond Manahan, 1955–1964
- William Parsons Todd, 1961–1954
- Edward K. Mills, Jr., 1949–1950
- Clyde Potts, 1937–1948
- W. Parsons Todd, 1935–1936
- Clyde Potts, 1923–1934
- David Barkman, 1919–1932
- Clifford Mills, 1915–1918
- John J. Todd, 1913–1914
- Arthur S. Pierson, 1911–1912
- Theodore Ayers, 1910
- Thomas W. Cauldwell, 1909
- Alexander Bennell, 1907–1908
- Charlton A. Reed, 1902–1906
- Norman Fox, 1900–1901
- Edward A. Quayle, 1894–1885
- John E. Taylor, 1884–1885
- James P. Sullivan, 1882–1883
- Henry W. Miller, 1880–1881
- Theodore Ayers, 1876–1879
- Alfred Mills, 1874–1875
- Joseph W. Ballentine, 1872–1873
- Samuel S. Halsey, 1870–1871
- George T. Cobb, 1865–1869, 1953–1954
- Clyde W. Potts (1876–1950), 1921 to 1934; born on November 1, 1876, in Libertyville, Iowa; died on May 19, 1950
- Theodore Ayers, 1909–1910
- Thomas W. Cauldwell, 1908–1909 (died)
- Alexander Bennell, 1906–1907
- Rev. Dr. Norman Fox, 1902
- Edward Quayle, 1894, 1896, 1898 (mayor during Spanish–American War)
- James Sullivan (~1837–1899), Democrat; grocer; Baptist; member of Freemasons; died May 9, 1899
- George Theodore Werts (1846–1910), 1886–1892
- Henry W. Miller, 1880–1881
- Theodore Ayers, 1876–1879
- Alfred Mills, 1874–1875
- Joseph W. Ballentine, 1872–1873
- Samuel S. Halsey, 1870–1871
- George Thomas Cobb (1813–1870), 1865–1869
- John Edwards Taylor (1834 – November 23, 1914)
