= Gerrymandering in the United States =

Partisan control of congressional redistricting after the 2020 elections, with the number of U.S. House seats each state received: Democratic control Republican control Split or bipartisan control Independent redistricting commission Single-district states (and the District of Columbia)

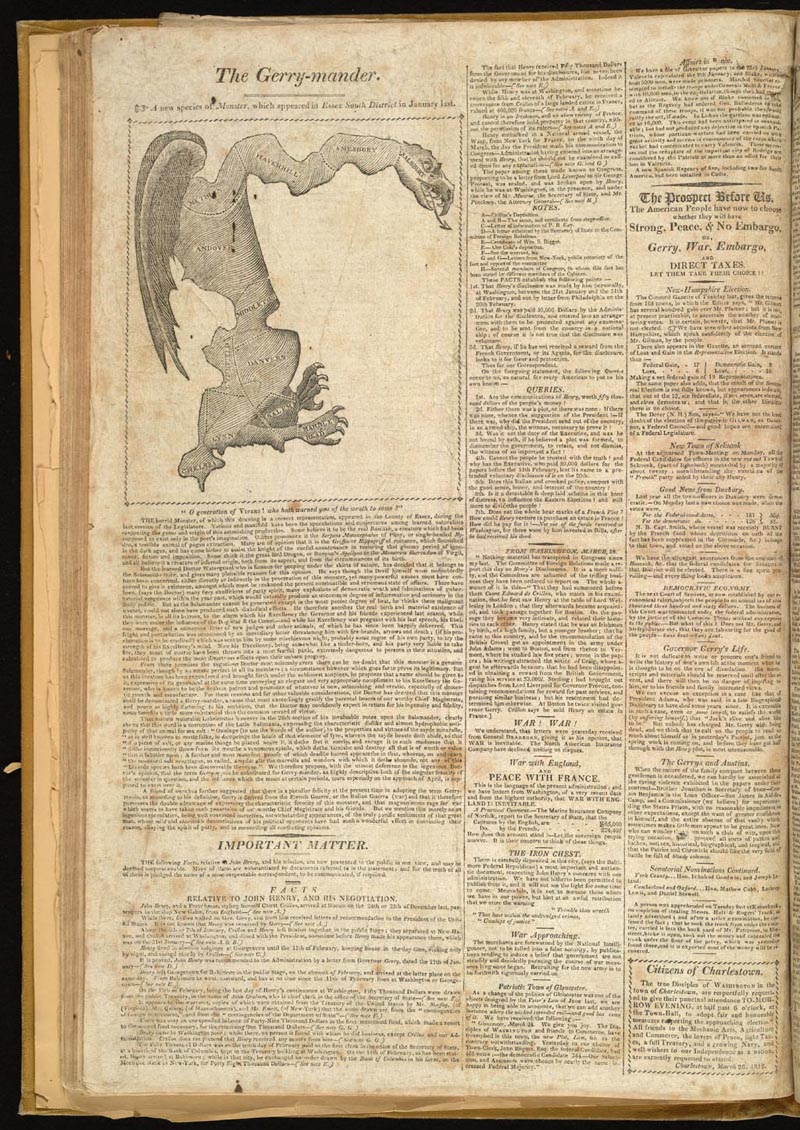
"The Gerry-mander" first appeared in this cartoon-map in the Boston Gazette, March 26, 1812.

Gerrymandering is the practice of setting boundaries of electoral districts to favor specific political interests within legislative bodies, often resulting in districts with convoluted, winding boundaries rather than compact areas. The term "gerrymandering" was coined in 1812 after a review of the redistricting maps of Massachusetts set by Governor Elbridge Gerry noted that one of the districts looked like a mythical salamander.

In the United States, redistricting takes place in each state about every ten years, after the decennial census. It defines geographical boundaries, with each district within a state being geographically contiguous and having about the same number of state voters. The resulting map affects the elections of the state's members of the United States House of Representatives and the state legislative bodies. Redistricting has always been regarded as a political exercise. In most states, it is controlled by state legislatures and sometimes the governor. In some states the governor has no veto power over redistricting legislation, while in some states the veto override threshold is a simple majority. In some states, an independent commission is tasked with drawing district boundaries.

When one party controls the state's legislative bodies and governor's office, it is in a strong position to gerrymander district boundaries to advantage its side and to disadvantage its political opponents. Since 2010, detailed maps and high-speed computing have facilitated gerrymandering by political parties in the redistricting process in order to gain control of the state legislature and congressional representation and potentially to maintain that control over several decades, even against shifting political changes in a state's population. The Supreme Court of the United States has allowed partisan gerrymandering to occur in cases such as in Vieth v. Jubelirer (2004) and Gill v. Whitford (2018).

Typical gerrymandering cases in the United States take the form of partisan gerrymandering, which is aimed at favoring one political party while weakening another; bipartisan gerrymandering, which is aimed at protecting incumbents by multiple political parties; and racial gerrymandering, which is aimed at maximizing or minimizing the impact of certain racial groups. In the past, federal courts have deemed extreme cases of gerrymandering to be unconstitutional, but have struggled with how to define the types of gerrymandering and the standards that should be used to determine which redistricting maps are unconstitutional. In 1995 the Supreme Court came to a 5–4 decision during Miller v. Johnson that racial gerrymandering is a violation of constitutional rights and upheld decisions against redistricting that is purposely devised based on race.

Racial gerrymandering effectively maximizes or minimizes the impact of racial minority votes in certain districts. Racial gerrymandering may be created without considerations of party lines but often redraw or reconstruct districts in ways that limit minority voters to smaller or a reduced number of districts. The effect of the Supreme Court's 2013 decision in Shelby County v. Holder on the Voting Rights Act of 1965, the rapid improvement of technology and the influx of dark money into redistricting are also possible factors that may impact the voting power of minorities. A 5–4 decision by the court in Rucho v. Common Cause (2019), stated that questions of gerrymandering represented a nonjusticiable political question which could not be dealt with by the federal court system and ultimately left it back to states and to Congress to develop remedies to challenge and to prevent gerrymandering.

Different ways to draw district boundaries in a hypothetical state

== Partisan gerrymandering ==
=== Origins (1789–2000) ===
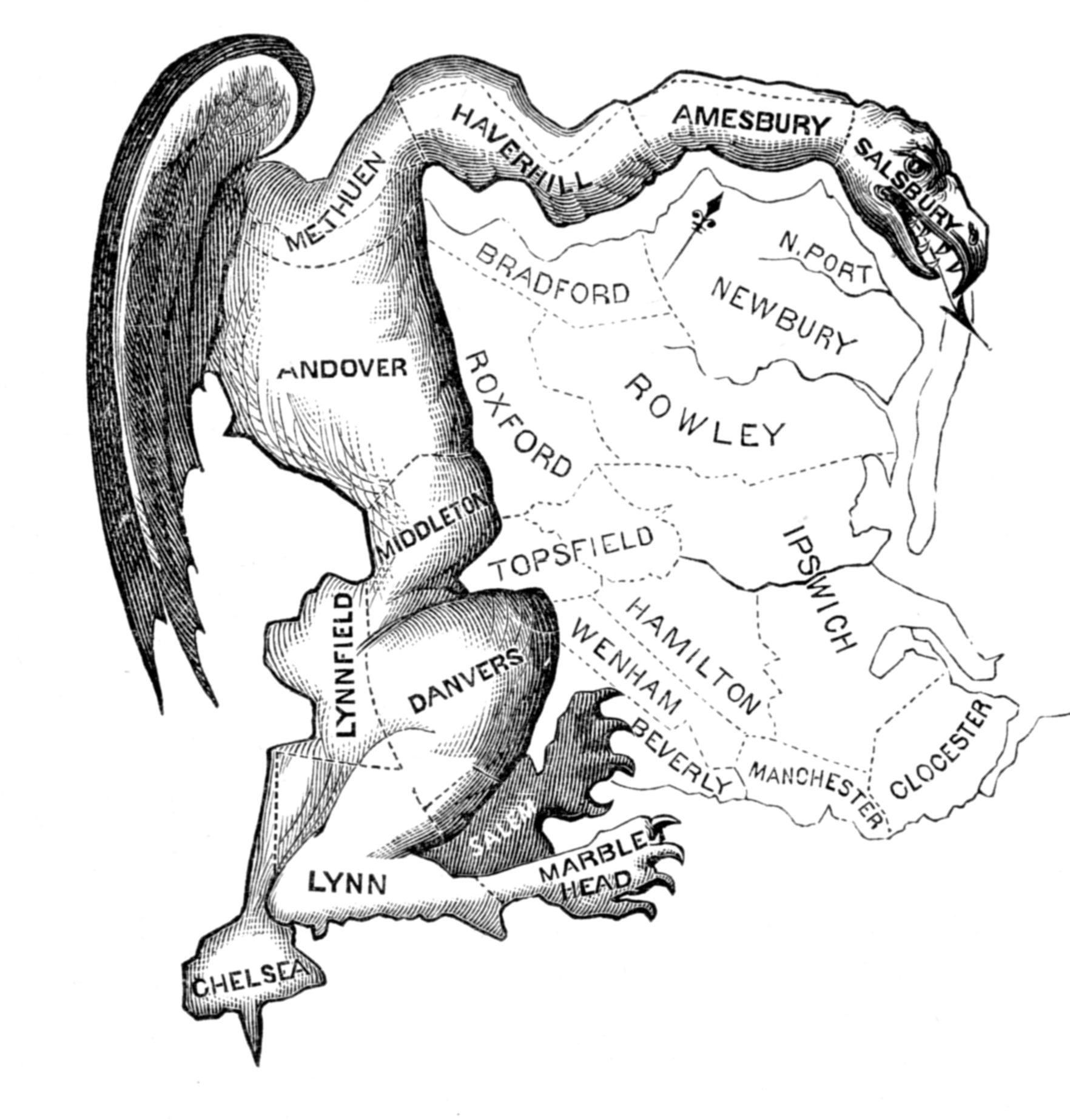
Printed in March 1812, this political cartoon was drawn in reaction to the newly drawn congressional electoral district of South Essex County drawn by the Massachusetts legislature to favor the Democratic-Republican Party candidates of Governor Elbridge Gerry over the Federalists. The caricature satirizes the bizarre shape of a district in Essex County, Massachusetts, as a dragon-like "monster". Federalist newspapers' editors and others at the time likened the district shape to a salamander, and the word gerrymander was born out of a portmanteau of that word and Governor Gerry's surname.

Partisan gerrymandering, which refers to redistricting that favors one political party, has a long tradition in the United States. Starting from the William Cabell Rives in mid-19th century it is often stated that it precedes the 1789 election of the First U.S. Congress: namely, that while Patrick Henry and his Anti-Federalist allies were in control of the Virginia House of Delegates in 1788, they drew the boundaries of Virginia's 5th congressional district in an unsuccessful attempt to keep James Madison out of the U.S. House of Representatives. In the early 20th century, it was revealed that this theory was based on incorrect claims by Madison and his allies, and recent historical research disproved it altogether.

The word gerrymander (originally written "Gerry-mander") was used for the first time in the Boston-Gazette on March 26, 1812, in reaction to a redrawing of Massachusetts state senate election districts under the then-governor Elbridge Gerry (1744–1814), who signed a bill that redistricted Massachusetts to benefit his Democratic-Republican Party. When mapped, one of the contorted districts to the north of Boston, the Essex South district, was said to resemble the shape of a salamander.

The coiner of the term "gerrymander" may never be firmly established. Historians widely believe that the Federalist newspaper editors Nathan Hale, and Benjamin and John Russell were the instigators, but the historical record does not have definitive evidence as to who created or uttered the word for the first time. Appearing with the term, and helping to spread and sustain its popularity, was a political cartoon depicting a strange animal with claws, wings and a dragon-like head satirizing the map of the odd-shaped district. This cartoon was most likely drawn by Elkanah Tisdale, an early 19th-century painter, designer, and engraver who was living in Boston at the time. The word gerrymander was reprinted numerous times in Federalist newspapers in Massachusetts, New England, and nationwide during the remainder of 1812.

Gerrymandering soon began to be used to describe not only the original Massachusetts example, but also other cases of district-shape manipulation for partisan gain in other states. The first known use outside the immediate Boston area came in the Newburyport Herald of Massachusetts on March 31, and the first known use outside Massachusetts came in the Concord Gazette of New Hampshire on April 14, 1812. The first known use outside New England came in the New York Gazette & General Advertiser on May 19. What may be the first use of the term to describe the redistricting in another state (Maryland) occurred in the Federal Republican (Georgetown, Washington, DC) on October 12, 1812. There are at least 80 known citations of the word from March through December 1812 in American newspapers.

The practice of gerrymandering the borders of new states continued past the Civil War and into the late 19th century. The Republican Party used its control of Congress to secure the admission of more states in territories friendly to their party. A notable example is the admission of Dakota Territory as two states instead of one. By the rules for representation in the Electoral College, each new state carried at least three electoral votes, regardless of its population. From time to time, other names are given the "-mander" suffix to tie a particular effort to a particular politician or group. These include "Jerrymander" (a reference to California Governor Jerry Brown), and "Perrymander" (a reference to Texas Governor Rick Perry). In the 1960s, a series of "one person, one vote" cases were decided by the Supreme Court, which resulted in a mandate of redistricting in response to the results of each census. Prior to these decisions, many states had stopped redrawing their districts. As a result of the periodic need to redistrict, political conflicts over redistricting have sharply increased.

=== 2000–2010 ===
The potential to gerrymander a district map has been aided by advances in computing power and capabilities. Using geographic information system and census data as input, mapmakers can use computers to process through numerous potential map configurations to achieve desired results, including partisan gerrymandering. Computers can assess voter preferences and use that to "pack" or "crack" votes into districts. Packing votes refers to concentrating voters in one voting district by redrawing congressional boundaries so that those in opposition of the party in charge of redistricting are placed into one larger district, therefore reducing the party's congressional representation.

Cracking refers to diluting the voting power of opposition voters across many districts by redrawing congressional boundaries so that voting minority populations in each district are reduced, therefore lowering the chance of a district-oriented congressional takeover. Both techniques lead to what the Times describes as "wasted votes", which are votes that do not supply a party with any victory. These can either be a surplus of votes in one district for one party that are above the threshold needed to win, or any vote that has resulted in a loss.

A 2017 University of Delaware study mentions situations in which an incumbent that is required to live in the district they represent can be "hijacked" or "kidnapped" into a neighboring district due to the redrawing of congressional boundaries, placing them in districts that are more difficult for them to win in. Partisan gerrymandering oftentimes leads to benefits for a particular political party, or, in some cases, a race. In Pennsylvania, the Republican-dominated state legislature used gerrymandering to help defeat Democratic representative Frank Mascara. Mascara was elected to Congress in 1994. In 2002, the Republican Party altered the boundaries of his original district so much that he was pitted against fellow Democratic candidate John Murtha in the election. The shape of Mascara's newly drawn district formed a finger that stopped at his street, encompassing his house, but not the spot where he parked his car. Murtha won the election in the newly formed district.

State legislatures have used gerrymandering along racial or ethnic lines both to decrease and increase minority representation in state governments and congressional delegations. In the state of Ohio, a conversation between Republican officials was recorded that demonstrated that redistricting was being done to aid their political candidates. The discussions assessed race of voters as a factor in redistricting, because African-Americans had backed Democratic candidates. Republicans apparently removed approximately 13,000 African-American voters from the district of Jim Raussen, a Republican candidate for the House of Representatives, in an attempt to tip the scales in what was once a competitive district for Democratic candidates.

International election observers from the Organization for Security and Co-operation in Europe Office for Democratic Institutions and Human Rights, who were invited to observe and report on the 2004 national elections, expressed criticism of the U.S. congressional redistricting process and made a recommendation that the procedures be reviewed to ensure genuine competitiveness of congressional election contests.

=== 2010–2020 ===
In the lead-up to the 2010 United States elections, the Republican Party initiated a program called REDMAP, the Redistricting Majority Project, which recognized that the party in control of state legislatures would have the ability to set their congressional and legislative district maps based on the pending 2010 United States census to assure that party's control over the next ten years.

The Republicans took significant gains from the 2010 elections across several states, and by 2011 and 2012, some of the new district maps showed Republican advantage through perceived partisan gerrymandering. This set the stage for several legal challenges from voters and groups in the court system, including several heard at the Supreme Court level. In 2018, Wisconsin's maps resulted in Democrats winning all statewide offices and the popular vote, but netting only 36 of 99 seats in the state assembly.

In 2015, Thomas Hofeller was hired by the Washington Free Beacon to analyze what would happen if political maps were drawn based on the population of voting-age U.S. citizens rather than the total population. He concluded that doing so "would be advantageous to Republicans and non-Hispanic whites." Although the study was not published, it was discovered after his death in 2018. Attorney General William P. Barr and Commerce Secretary Wilbur L. Ross Jr. have refused to cooperate with an investigation into why the Trump administration added a U.S. citizenship question to the 2020 census and specifically whether it seeks to benefit Republicans as suggested by Hofeller's study.

In 2015, Analyst Kimball Brace stated that the two major parties have traditionally differed in the way they redraw districts: Democrats have constructed coalition districts of liberals and minorities together with conservatives, while Republicans have constructed districts that are more demographically homogeneous.

Several state court rulings found partisan gerrymandering to be impermissible under state constitutions, and several state ballot measures passed in 2018 that require non-partisan commissions for the 2020 redistricting cycle.

=== 2021–present ===
In August 2025, Texas Republicans in the state house passed a mid-decade redistricting, with the new maps drawn to give the state five new Republican-majority districts, giving them 30 of the state's 38 seats in the U.S. House of Representatives ahead of the 2026 general elections.

This was accomplished by gerrymandering strong Democratic urban areas like Austin, San Antonio, Houston, and Dallas. While the redistricting was stated to be only on partisan lines by the Republicans, allowed by Rucho v. Common Cause, Democratic lawmakers in Texas claimed that the new maps violated the VRA due to racial gerrymandering and plan to challenge the maps in court.

The move was supported by the Trump administration, and in response, several other Democratic-heavy states including California, Illinois, and New York, asserted they would also consider mid-decade redistricting to increase the number of Democratic representatives. As of October 2025 the maps that will likely be in place for the 2026 elections are expected to create 9 additional Republican seats while removing 4 Democratic and 5 competitive seats.

However, by the time of the 2026 general election, many of Trump's policies, such as the 2026 Iran War, had created financial hardships for consumers such as high gas prices. As a result, the election swung greatly in favor of the Democratic party, gaining the majority in both Houses. States like Texas and Ohio had engaged in mid-decade redistricting intended to favor the Republican Party, but the new districts resulted in Democratic Party majorities, making these redistricting attempts "dummymandering".

=== Legality ===
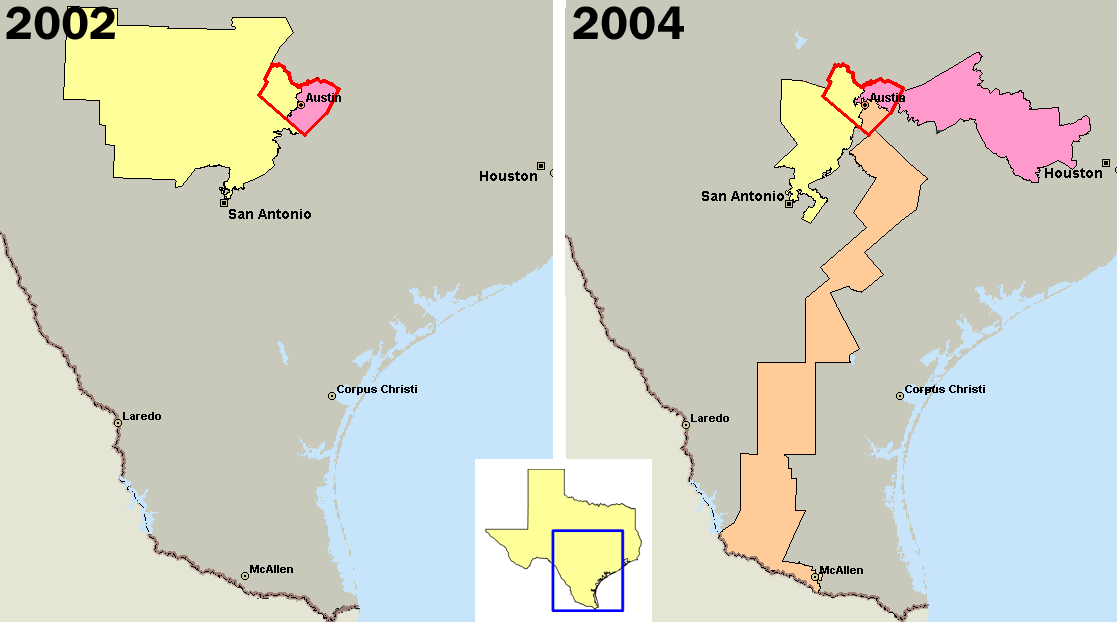
U.S. congressional districts covering Travis County, Texas (outlined in red), in 2002, left, and 2004, right. In 2003, the majority of Republicans in the Texas legislature redistricted the state, diluting the voting power of the heavily Democratic county by parceling its residents out to more Republican districts. In 2004 the orange district 25 was intended to elect a Democrat while the yellow and pink district 21 and district 10 were intended to elect Republicans. District 25 was redrawn as the result of a 2006 Supreme Court decision. In the 2011 redistricting, Republicans divided Travis County among five districts, only one of which, extending to San Antonio, elects a Democrat.

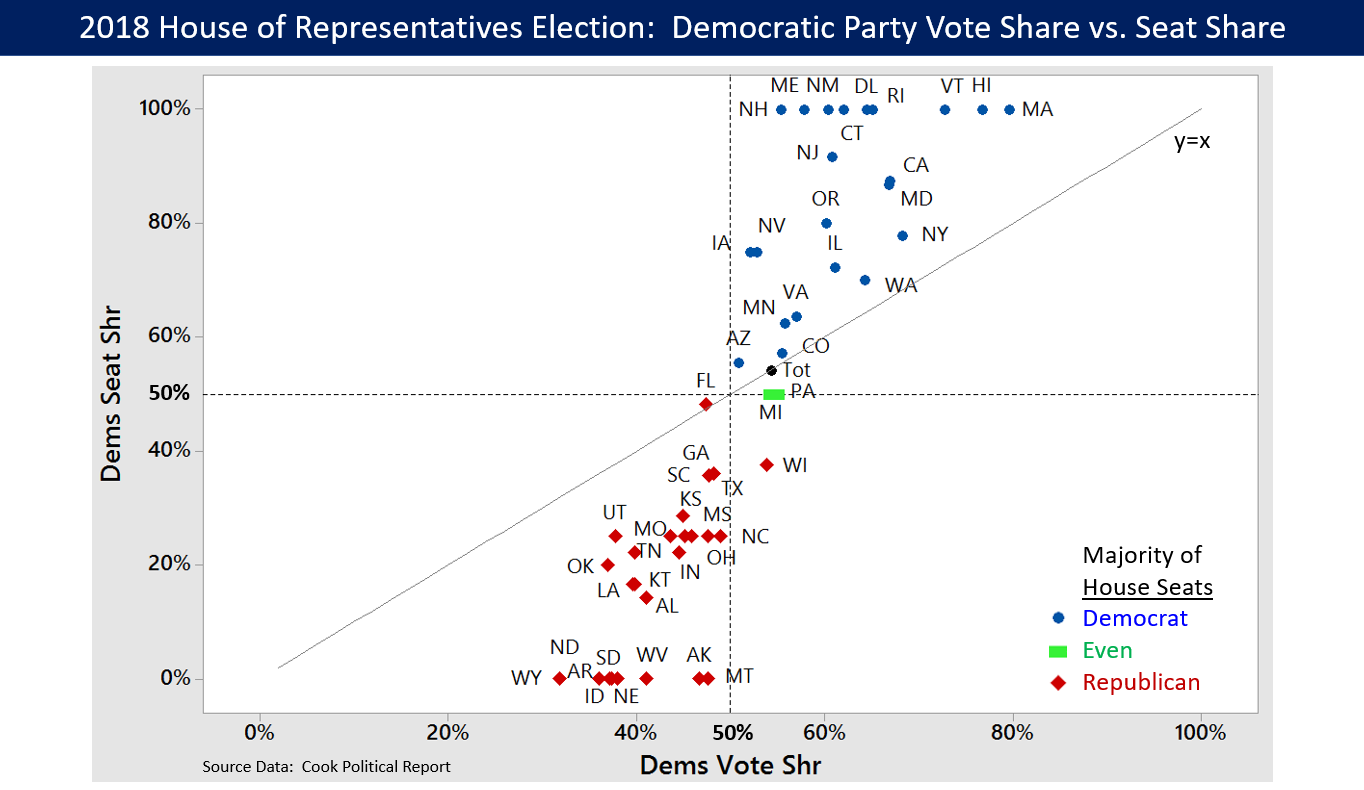
2018 election results for the U.S. House of Representatives, showing Democratic Party vote share and seat share. While the overall vote share and seat share were the same at 54%, there were several states with significant differences in share. Note that several states with few or one representative appear at the 0 or 100% seat share. States with more representatives and sizable share differences are more analytically relevant for evaluating the risk of gerrymandering.

==== Federal courts ====
In 1962, a 6-2 decision decided by the Supreme Court of the United States' stated in Baker v. Carr that state issues regarding state legislative redistricting could be reviewed by federal courts. Though, the original reason the case was brought to court was due to resident Charles Baker arguing that Tennessee's previous districts violated the Equal Protection Clause through subjugating urban areas to less political voting power, as opposed to rural areas. Despite the original claim, the court did not address the constitutionality of Tennessee's districts.

After Baker v. Carr, in 1963 was Wesberry v. Sanders in which The Supreme Court of the United States decided that Georgia's congressional district mappings violated Article 1, Section 2 of the U.S. Constitution, which states representatives must be "chosen... by the People of the several States." Subsequently, Reynolds v. Sims challenged the 14th Amendment's constituent on equal representation in terms of the issue on equal representation for voters in rural areas having less power than voters in urban areas. One argument from Reynolds states, "Again, people, not land or trees or pastures, vote." This ultimately decided the principle of "One man, one vote."

Whether a redistricting results in a partisan gerrymandering has been a frequent question put to the United States court system, but which the courts have generally avoided a strong ruling for fear of showing political bias towards either of the major parties. The Supreme Court had ruled in Davis v. Bandemer (1986) that partisan gerrymandering violates the Equal Protection Clause and is a justiciable matter. However, in its decision, the Court could not agree on the appropriate constitutional standard against which legal claims of partisan gerrymandering should be evaluated. Writing for a plurality of the Court, Justice White said that partisan gerrymandering occurred when a redistricting plan was enacted with both the intent and the effect of discriminating against an identifiable political group. Justices Powell and Stevens said that partisan gerrymandering should be identified based on multiple factors, such as electoral district shape and adherence to local government boundaries. Justices O'Connor, Burger, and Rehnquist disagreed with the view that partisan gerrymandering claims were justiciable and would have held that such claims should not be recognized by courts. Lower courts found it difficult to apply Bandemer, and only in one subsequent case, Party of North Carolina v. Martin (1992), did a lower court strike down a redistricting plan on partisan gerrymandering grounds.

The Supreme Court revisited the concept of partisan gerrymandering claims in Vieth v. Jubelirer (2004). While the Court upheld that partisan gerrymandering could be justiciable, the justices were divided in this specific case as no clear standard against which to evaluate partisan gerrymandering claims emerged. Writing for a plurality, Justice Scalia said that partisan gerrymandering claims were nonjusticiable. A majority of the court would continue to allow partisan gerrymandering claims to be considered justiciable, but those justices had divergent views on how such claims should be evaluated. Justice Anthony Kennedy, in a concurrence with the plurality, offered that a manageable means to determine when partisan gerrymandering occurred could be developed, and challenged lower courts to find such means. The Court again upheld that partisan gerrymandering could be justiciable in League of United Latin American Citizens v. Perry (2006). While the specific case reached no conclusion of whether there was partisan gerrymandering, Justice John Paul Stevens's concurrence with the plurality added the notion of partisan symmetry, in that the electoral system should translate votes to representative seats with the same efficiency regardless of party.

Opinions from Vieth and League, as well as the strong Republican advantage created by its REDMAP program, had led to a number of political scholars working alongside courts to develop such a method to determine if a district map was a justiciable partisan gerrymandering, as to prepare for the 2020 elections. Many early attempts failed to gain traction the court system, focusing more on trying to show how restricting maps were intended to favor one party or disfavor the other, or that the redistricting eschewed traditional redistricting approaches. Around 2014, Nicholas Stephanopoulos and Eric McGhee developed the "efficiency gap", a means to measure the number of wasted votes (votes either far in excess of what was necessary to secure a win for a party, or votes for a party that had little chance to win) within each district. The larger the gap of wasted votes between the two parties implied the more likely that the district maps supported a partisan gerrymandering, and with a sufficiently large gap it would be possible to sustain that gap indefinitely. While not perfect, having several potential flaws when geography of urban centers were considered, the efficiency gap was considered to be the first tool that met both Kennedy's and Stevens' suggestions.

The first major legal test of the efficiency gap came into play for Gill v. Whitford (2016). The District Court in the case used the efficiency gap statistic to evaluate the claim of partisan gerrymander in Wisconsin's legislative districts. In the 2012 election for the state legislature, the efficiency gap was 11.69% to 13% in favor of the Republicans. "Republicans in Wisconsin won 60 of the 99 Assembly seats, despite Democrats having a majority of the statewide vote."

Moving the Harris's from a Democratic, Milwaukee district into a larger Republican area was part of a strategy known as 'packing and cracking.' Heavily Democratic Milwaukee voters were 'packed' together in fewer districts, while other sections of Milwaukee were 'cracked' and added to several Republican districts ... diluting that Democratic vote. The result? Three fewer Democrats in the state assembly representing the Milwaukee area.

— PBS NewsHour October 1, 2017

The court found that the disparate treatment of Democratic and Republican voters violated the 1st and 14th amendments to the U.S. Constitution. The District Court's ruling was challenged and appealed to the Supreme Court of the United States, which in June 2017 agreed to hear oral arguments in the case in the 2017–2018 term of court. The case was then dismissed due to lack of standing for the plaintiffs with no decision on the merits being made. The case was then remanded for further proceedings to demonstrate standing. While previous redistricting cases before the Supreme Court have involved the Equal Protection test, this case also centers on the applicability of the First Amendment freedom of association clause.

Benisek v. Lamone was a separate partisan gerrymandering case heard by the Supreme Court in the 2017 term, this over perceived Democratic-favored redistricting of Maryland's 6th congressional district, with plaintiffs trying to get a stay on the use of the new district maps prior to the October 2018 general election. The Court did not give opinions on whether the redistricting was unconstitutional, but did establish that on the basis of Gill that the case should be reconsidered at the District Court. The District Court did subsequently rule the redistricting was unconstitutional, and that decision was appealed again to the Supreme Court and was heard under the name Lamone v. Benisek alongside Rucho v. Common Cause on March 26, 2019.

Rucho v. Common Cause deals with Republican-favored gerrymandering in North Carolina. The District Court had ruled the redistricting was unconstitutional prior to Gill; an initial challenge brought to the Supreme Court resulted in an order for the District Court to re-evaluate their decision in light of Gill. The District Court, on rehearing, affirmed their previous decision. The state Republicans again sought for review by the Supreme Court which was heard alongside Lamone v. Benisek on March 26, 2019.

Similarly, Michigan's post-2010 redistricting had been challenged, and in April 2019, a federal court determined the Republican-led redistricting to be an unconstitutional partisan gerrymander, and ordered the state to redraw districts in time for the 2020 election. Within a week, a similar decision was arrived by a federal district court reviewing Ohio's district maps since 2012 and were declared unconstitutional as they were drawn by the Republican-majority lawmakers with "invidious partisan intent", and ordered the maps redrawn. The Republican-favored maps led Ohio's residents to vote for a statewide initiative that requires the new redistricting maps after the 2020 census to have at least 50% approval from the minority party. The Republican party sought an immediate challenge to the redistricting order, and by late May 2019, the Supreme Court ordered both the court-ordered redrawing to be put on hold until Republicans can prepare a complete petition, without commenting on the merits of the case otherwise. Additionally, observers to the Supreme Court recognized that the Court would be issuing its orders to the North Carolina and Maryland cases, which would likely affect how the Michigan and Ohio court orders would be interpreted.

Rucho v. Common Cause and Lamone v. Benisek were decided on June 27, 2019, which, in the 5–4 decision, determined that judging partisan gerrymandering cases is outside of the remit of the federal court system due to the political questions involved. The majority opinion stated that extreme partisan gerrymandering is still unconstitutional, but it is up to Congress and state legislative bodies to find ways to restrict that, such as through the use of independent redistricting commissions.

==== State courts ====
The Pennsylvania Supreme Court ruled in League of Women Voters of Pennsylvania v. Commonwealth of Pennsylvania that gerrymandering was unconstitutional, ruling that the districts drawn to favor Republicans violated "free and equal" Elections Clause of the Pennsylvanian constitution and redrew the districts after the state government failed to comply with the deadline in its order to redraw. The U.S. Supreme Court denied to hear the challenge and allowed the Pennsylvania Supreme Court's maps to remain in place.

In October 2019, a three-judge panel in North Carolina threw out a gerrymandered electoral map with its decision in the case of Harper v. Hall, citing violation of the constitution to disadvantage the Democratic Party. The North Carolina Supreme Court affirmed this decision in February 2022, in a 4-3 party-line vote. This decision was overturned in April 2023 by a new ruling in the same case, after the state supreme court shifted from Democratic to Republican control. A federal case over the same maps was heard as Moore v. Harper, under the independent state legislature theory. The court rejected the theory.

On December 22, 2023, the Wisconsin Supreme Court decided Clarke v. Wisconsin Elections Commission, holding that Wisconsin's state legislative districts violated the Constitution of Wisconsin. Writing for an ideologically divided Court, Justice Jill Karofsky enjoined the use of Wisconsin's legislative maps for further elections and ordered new maps to be drawn ahead of the 2024 United States elections.

== Bipartisan gerrymandering ==
Bipartisan gerrymandering, where redistricting favors the incumbents in both the Democratic and Republican parties, became especially relevant in the 2000 redistricting process, which created some of the most non-competitive redistricting plans in American history. The Supreme Court held in Gaffney v. Cummings (1973) that bipartisan gerrymanders are constitutionally permissible under the Equal Protection Clause.

== Racial gerrymandering ==
Racial makeup can be used as a means to create gerrymanders. There is overlap between racial and partisan gerrymandering, as minorities tend to favor Democratic candidates; the North Carolina redistricting in Rucho v. Common Cause was such a case dealing with both partisan and racial gerrymanders. However, racial gerrymanders can also be created without considerations of party lines.

=== Negative ===
"Negative racial gerrymandering" refers to a process in which district lines are drawn to prevent racial minorities from electing their preferred candidates. Between the Reconstruction Era and mid-20th century, white Southern Democrats effectively controlled redistricting throughout the Southern United States. In areas where some African-American and other minorities succeeded in registering, some states created districts that were gerrymandered to reduce the voting impact of minorities. Minorities were effectively deprived of their franchise into the 1960s.

With the passage of the Voting Rights Act of 1965 and its subsequent amendments, redistricting to carve maps to intentionally diminish the power of voters who were in a racial or linguistic minority, was prohibited. The Voting Rights Act was amended by Congress in the 1980s, Congress to "make states redraw maps if they have a discriminatory effect." In July, 2017, San Juan County, Utah, was ordered to redraw its county commission and school board election districts again after U.S. District Judge Robert Shelby ruled them unconstitutional. The Native Americans, who were in the majority, argued that their voice had been suppressed "when they are packed into gerrymandered districts."

In October 2022, the Supreme Court heard arguments in Merrill v. Milligan to conclude whether or not Alabama is obligated to create a second Black-majority congressional district under the Voting rights Act of 1965. This is because of packing people of color into the 7th district to then separate the rest of the Black electorate into six white-majority states, diluting their ability to impact elections.

=== Affirmative ===
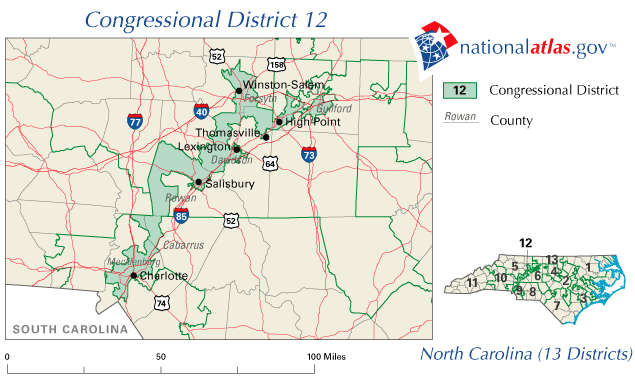
Shaw v. Reno was a United States Supreme Court case involving a claim that North Carolina's 12th congressional district (pictured) was affirmatively racially gerrymandered.

While the Equal Protection Clause, along with Section 2 and Section 5 of the Voting Rights Act, prohibit jurisdictions from gerrymandering electoral districts to dilute the votes of racial groups, the Supreme Court has held that in some instances, the Equal Protection Clause prevents jurisdictions from drawing district lines to favor racial groups. The Supreme Court first recognized these "affirmative racial gerrymandering" claims in Shaw v. Reno (Shaw I) (1993), holding that plaintiffs "may state a claim by alleging that [redistricting] legislation, though race neutral on its face, rationally cannot be understood as anything other than an effort to separate voters into different districts on the basis of race, and that the separation lacks sufficient justification".

The Supreme Court reasoned that these claims were cognizable because relying on race in redistricting "reinforces racial stereotypes and threatens to undermine our system of representative democracy by signaling to elected officials that they represent a particular racial group rather than their constituency as a whole". Later opinions characterized the type of unconstitutional harm created by racial gerrymandering as an "expressive harm", which law professors Richard Pildes and Richard Neimi have described as a harm "that results from the idea or attitudes expressed through a governmental action."

Subsequent cases further defined the counters of racial gerrymandering claims and how those claims relate to the Voting Rights Act. In United States v. Hays (1995), the Supreme Court held that only those persons who reside in a challenged district may bring a racial gerrymandering claim. In Miller v. Johnson (1995), the Supreme Court held that a redistricting plan must be subjected to strict scrutiny if the jurisdiction used race as the "predominant factor" in determining how to draw district lines. The court defined "predominance" as meaning that the jurisdiction gave more priority to racial considerations than to traditional redistricting principles such as "compactness, contiguity, [and] respect for political subdivisions or communities defined by actual shared interests." In determining whether racial considerations predominated over traditional redistricting principles, courts may consider both direct and circumstantial evidence of the jurisdiction's intent in drawing the district lines, and irregularly-shaped districts constitute strong circumstantial evidence that the jurisdiction relied predominately on race. If a court concludes that racial considerations predominated, then a redistricting plan is considered a "racially gerrymandered" plan and must be subjected to strict scrutiny, meaning that the redistricting plan will be upheld as constitutional only if it is narrowly tailored to advance a compelling state interest. In Bush v. Vera (1996), the Supreme Court in a plurality opinion assumed that compliance with Section 2 or Section 5 of the Act constituted compelling interests, and lower courts have treated these two interests as the only compelling interests that may justify the creation of racially gerrymandered districts.

In Hunt v. Cromartie (1999) and its follow-up case Easley v. Cromartie (2001), the Supreme Court approved a racially focused gerrymandering of a congressional district on the grounds that the definition was not pure racial gerrymandering but instead partisan gerrymandering, which is constitutionally permissible. With the increasing racial polarization of parties in the South in the U.S. as conservative whites move from the Democratic to the Republican Party, gerrymandering may become partisan and also achieve goals for ethnic representation.

Examples of affirmative racial gerrymandering have emerged. When the state legislature considered representation for Arizona's Native American reservations, they thought each needed their own House member, because of historic conflicts between the Hopi and Navajo nations. Since the Hopi reservation is completely surrounded by the Navajo reservation, the legislature created an unusual district configuration for the 2nd congressional district that featured a fine filament along a river course several hundred miles in length to attach the Hopi reservation to the rest of the district; the arrangement lasted until 2013. The California state legislature created a congressional district (2003–2013) that extended over a narrow coastal strip for several miles. It ensured that a common community of interest will be represented, rather than having portions of the coastal areas be split up into districts extending into the interior, with domination by inland concerns.

In the case of League of United Latin American Citizens v. Perry, the United States Supreme Court upheld on June 28, 2006, most of a Texas congressional map suggested in 2003 by former United States House Majority Leader Tom DeLay, and enacted by the state of Texas. The 7–2 decision allows state legislatures to redraw districts as often as they like (not just after the decennial census). In his dissenting opinion in LULAC v. Perry, Justice John Paul Stevens, joined by Justice Stephen Breyer, quoted Bill Ratliffe, former Texas lieutenant governor and member of the Texas state senate saying, "political gain for the Republicans was 110% the motivation for the plan", and argued that a plan whose "sole intent" was partisan could violate the Equal Protection Clause. This was notable as previously Justice Stevens had joined Justice Breyer's opinion in Easley v. Cromartie, which held that explicitly partisan motivation for gerrymanders was permissible and a defense against claims of racial gerrymandering. Thus they may work to protect their political parties' standing and number of seats, so long as they do not harm racial and ethnic minority groups. A 5–4 majority declared one congressional district unconstitutional in the case because of harm to an ethnic minority.

In Shelby County v. Holder (2013) the Court ruled by a 5 to 4 vote that Section 4(b) of the Voting Rights Act was unconstitutional because the coverage formula was based on data over 40 years old, making it no longer responsive to current needs and therefore an impermissible burden on the constitutional principles of federalism and equal sovereignty of the states. The Court did not strike down Section 5, but without Section 4(b), no jurisdiction will be subject to Section 5 preclearance unless Congress enacts a new coverage formula. By rendering Section 5 inoperable, the Court removed federal jurisdiction over matters arising from gerrymandering.

In the wake of the 2020 Census, states issued new redistricting maps, leading the multiple court challenges. Two cases reached the Supreme Court. The first was Allen v. Milligan, dealing with Alabama's maps for its seven seats. The Republican-controlled legislature had redrawn the map to keep only one black-majority district of the seven allocated to the state, despite the black population being around 30%. The map was challenged on racial discrimination under both the VRA and the Fourteenth Amendment, and in a 5-4 decision, the Supreme Court agreed the map violated the VRA and at least one additional majority-minority district must be included.

A similar suit, Louisiana v. Callais, arose from Louisiana's redistricting, which allocated only one majority-minority district of its six despite the black population being over 30% of the state. In wake of Allen, the Supreme Court upheld a lower court decision that the state must redraw the map to include two majority-minority districts under the VRA. The new maps were challenged by a group of non-minority voters on a constitutional challenge, rather than statutory, that the new map was racially-motivated, violating both the Fourteenth and Fifteenth Amendments. A panel of district judges agreed that race was improperly used to design the new maps, leading to another Supreme Court challenge. While the Supreme Court heard the case in its 2024 term, they delayed ruling on the case and asked for additional hearings in the 2025 term. In 2026, The Court, in a 6–3 decision along ideological lines, ruled that Louisiana's new redistricting map was an unconstitutional racial gerrymander under the Fifteenth Amendment.

==== Unholy alliance ====
The creation of majority-black districts often results in the "packing" of Democratic-leaning voters into fewer districts. During the 1980s and 1990s, when white Democrats in the South would often split black voters across several districts for partisan gain, some black legislators began to join Republicans in what became known as an "unholy alliance" to push for more black-majority districts at the cost of electing fewer overall Democrats. This had the secondary effect of culling white Democratic legislators, contributing to a perception, particularly in the South, of the Democrats as being the party of black and other minority voters, while Republicans became the party of white voters. As late as the 2003 Texas redistricting, Republicans used this strategy to target white Democrats while preserving districts represented by non-white Democrats, solidifying Republican control of the state's congressional delegation. By the 2010s, however, this alliance had largely fallen apart as Republicans no longer needed support from black legislators to control the redistricting process.

== Inclusion of prisons ==
Since the 1790 United States census, the United States Census Bureau has counted prisoner populations as residents of the districts in which they are incarcerated, rather than in the same district as their previous pre-incarceration residence. In jurisdictions where incarcerated people cannot vote, moving boundaries around a prison can create a district out of what would otherwise be a population of voters which is too small. One extreme example is Waupun, Wisconsin, where two city council districts are made up of 61% and 76% incarcerated people, but as of 2019, neither elected representative has visited the local prisons. "Prison gerrymandering" has been criticized for distorting racial demographics and, as a result, political representation. A 2021 article in The New York Times argued that, as prisoners are disproportionately people of color from urban areas incarcerated in rural areas, "counting people where they're imprisoned takes political power away from racial minorities in cities and transfers it to whites in rural areas."

=== Reform efforts ===
In 2018, the Census Bureau announced that it would retain the policy, asserting that the policy "is consistent with the concept of usual residence, as established by the Census Act of 1790," but also conceding assistance to states who wish "'to 'move' their prisoner population back to the prisoners' pre-incarceration addresses for redistricting and other purposes". Some states have created independent redistricting commissions to reduce political drivers for redistricting. The research department of the nonpartisan nonprofit anti-corruption organization RepresentUs issues a Redistricting Report Card which rates the level of gerrymandered distortion of congressional district maps within each state, and its research suggests that wide swaths of the public "across partisan lines" are dissatisfied with gerrymandering and are ready for substantive reforms.

A number of states have since ordered their state governments to recognize incarcerated persons as residents of their pre-incarceration homes for the sake of legislative and congressional redistricting at all levels. These include the states of Maryland and New York in time for the 2010 census. States that made similar orders in time for the 2020 census include California (2011), Delaware (2010), Nevada (2019), Washington (2019), New Jersey (2020), Colorado (2020), Virginia (2020) and Connecticut (2021), Montana (2023) and Minnesota (2024). Illinois passed a law which will apply starting with the 2030 census.

Additionally, Colorado (2002), Michigan (1966), Tennessee (2016) and Virginia (2013) have passed laws restricting counties and municipalities from (or allowing counties and municipalities to avoid) prison-based redistricting, and Massachusetts passed a 2014 resolution requesting the Census Bureau to end the practice of counting prisoners in their incarceration districts. Pennsylvania's legislative redistricting committee voted in 2021 to draw new legislative maps which avoid prison gerrymandering, as did Rhode Island's legislative redistricting committee in 2022 for legislative and congressional maps. Montana's committee also voted to avoid prison gerrymandering, and a bill was passed in 2023 to prohibit the practice in future cycles.

State	Prohibition passed	Redistricting committee passed	Municipalities and counties	First census affected
California	2011			2020
Colorado	2020		2002	2020
Connecticut	2021			2020
Delaware	2010			2020
Illinois	2021			2030
Maryland	2010			2010
Michigan			1966	
Minnesota	2024			
Montana	2023	2021		2020
Nevada	2019			2020
New Jersey	2020			2020
New York				2010
Pennsylvania		2021		2020
Rhode Island		2022		2020
Tennessee			2016	
Virginia	2020		2013	2020
Washington	2019			2020

== Remedies ==
Various political and legal remedies have been used or proposed to diminish or prevent gerrymandering in the country.

=== Neutral redistricting criteria ===
Various constitutional and statutory provisions may compel a court to strike down a gerrymandered redistricting plan. At the federal level, the Supreme Court has held that if a jurisdiction's redistricting plan violates the Equal Protection Clause or Voting Rights Act of 1965, a federal court must order the jurisdiction to propose a new redistricting plan that remedies the gerrymandering. Under Rucho v. Common Cause, this does not include purely partisan gerrymandering, but can include maps drawn to promote white supremacy, for example. If the jurisdiction fails to propose a new redistricting plan, or its proposed redistricting plan continues to violate the law, then the court itself must draw a redistricting plan that cures the violation and use its equitable powers to impose the plan on the jurisdiction.

In the Supreme Court case of Karcher v. Daggett (1983), a New Jersey redistricting plan was overturned when it was found to be unconstitutional by violating the constitutional principle of one person, one vote. Despite the state claiming its unequal redistricting was done to preserve minority voting power, the court found no evidence to support this and deemed the redistricting unconstitutional. At the state level, state courts may order or impose redistricting plans on jurisdictions where redistricting legislation prohibits gerrymandering. For example, in 2010 Florida adopted two state constitutional amendments that prohibit the Florida Legislature from drawing redistricting plans that favor or disfavor any political party or incumbent. Ohio residents passed an initiative in 2018 that requires the redistricting maps to have at least 50% approval by the minority party in the legislature. Moon Duchin, a Tufts University professor, has proposed the use of metric geometry to measure gerrymandering for forensic purposes.

=== Redistricting commissions ===
Congressional redistricting methods by state after the 2020 census: Independent commission Politician commission Passed by legislature with gubernatorial approval Passed by legislature, governor plays no role Passed by legislature, simple majority veto override Not applicable for the U.S. House of Representatives due to having one at-large district * The Ohio Constitution requires that redistricting votes in the Ohio Legislature be bipartisan, with a minimum number of votes required from both parties for a redistricting act to pass

Congressional redistricting methods by state after the 2010 census: State legislatures control redistricting Commissions control redistricting Nonpartisan staff develop the maps, which are then voted on by the state legislature No federal redistricting due to having only one congressional district

Some states have established non-partisan redistricting commissions with redistricting authority. Washington, Arizona, and California have created standing committees for redistricting following the 2010 census. It has been argued that the Californian standing committee has failed to end gerrymandering. Rhode Island and the New Jersey Redistricting Commission have developed ad hoc committees, but developed the past two decennial reapportionments tied to new census data.

The Arizona State Legislature challenged the constitutionality of a non-partisan commission, rather than the legislature, for redistricting. In Arizona State Legislature v. Arizona Independent Redistricting Commission (2015), the United States Supreme Court upheld the constitutionality of non-partisan commissions.

=== Redistricting algorithms ===
Some have proposed using a computer program to draw districts. Under this approach, mapmakers would select a redistricting algorithm to draw districts based on a predetermined set of instructions. A computer-based approach offers the potential to prevent gerrymandering by removing human mapmakers from the process. The challenge is agreeing on a redistricting algorithm. Many of the choices that go into the design of a redistricting algorithm have predictable political outcomes, so political bias can still play a role in a computer-based approach.

Alternatively, redistricting algorithms can be used to find gerrymandering. An algorithm can compare proposed districts to a sample of other potential redistricting plans to determine to what extent the proposed districts are outliers. If proposed districts have more extreme features than most of the sample, the proposed plans are likely gerrymanders. This kind of analysis has played prominent roles in partisan gerrymandering litigation.

Many redistricting algorithms have been developed with varying results and several programs are capable of satisfying all of the redistricting criteria. No U.S. state has adopted a redistricting algorithm. Although, some states have introduced proposals to consider redistricting algorithms.

=== Alternative voting systems ===
The predominant voting system in the United States is a first-past-the-post system that uses single-member districts. Various alternative district-based voting systems that do not rely on redistricting, or rely on redistricting minimally, have been proposed that may mitigate against the ability to gerrymander. These systems typically involve a form of at-large elections or multimember districts. Examples of such systems include the single-transferable vote, cumulative voting, and limited voting.

==== Proportional representation ====
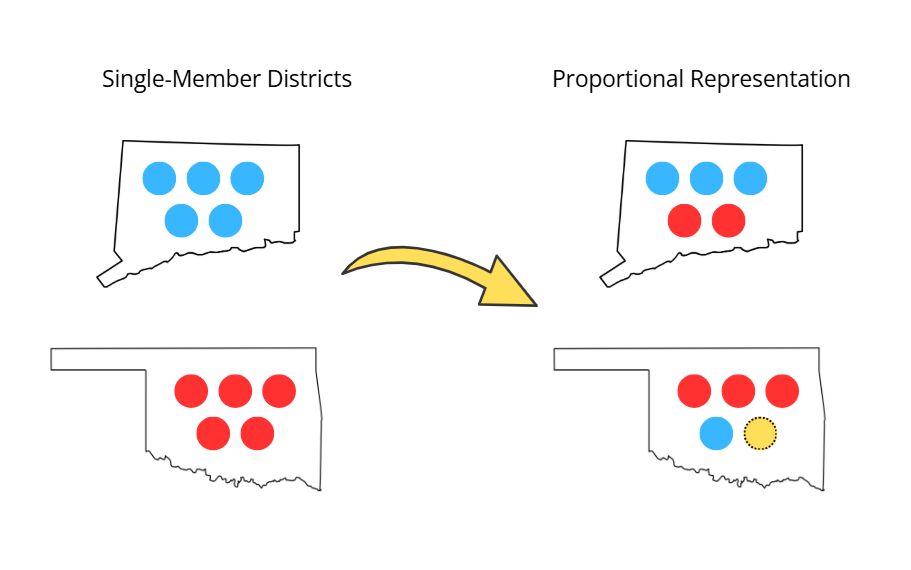
Possible representation in the congressional delegations of Connecticut and Oklahoma under the Fair Representation Act, which is designed to eliminate partisan gerrymandering

Proportional voting systems, such as those used in all but three European states, would bypass the problem altogether. In these systems, the party that gets, for example, 30 percent of the votes gets roughly 30 percent of the seats in the legislature. Although it is common for European states to have more than two parties, a sufficiently high election threshold can limit the number of parties elected.

Some proportional voting systems have no districts or larger multimember districts and may break the strong constituency link, a cornerstone of current American politics, by eliminating the dependency of individual representatives on a concrete electorate. Systems like mixed-member proportional representation keep local single-member constituencies, but balance their results with nationally elected or regionally-elected representatives to reach party proportionality.

== Effects ==
=== Democracy ===
A 2020 study found that gerrymandering "impedes numerous party functions at both the congressional and state house levels. Candidates are less likely to contest districts when their party is disadvantaged by a districting plan. Candidates that do choose to run are more likely to have weak resumes. Donors are less willing to contribute money. And ordinary voters are less apt to support the targeted party. These results suggest that gerrymandering has long‐term effects on the health of the democratic process beyond simply costing or gaining parties seats in the legislature."

=== Gerrymandering and the environment ===
Gerrymandering has the ability to create numerous problems for the constituents impacted by the redistricting. A study done by the peer-reviewed Environmental Justice Journal analyzed how gerrymandering contributes to environmental racism. It suggested that partisan gerrymandering can often lead to adverse health complications for minority populations that live closer to United States superfund sites and additionally found that during redistricting periods, minority populations are "effectively gerrymandered out" of districts that tend to have fewer people of color in them and are farther away from toxic waste sites. This redistricting can be seen as a deliberate move to further marginalize minority populations and restrict them from gaining access to congressional representation and potentially fixing environmental hazards in their communities.

=== Gerrymandering and access to healthcare ===
Gerrymandering effects can expand into different areas of public policy. A report by the Center for American Progress investigated how partisan gerrymandering across various US states has restricted the amplification of Medicaid resulting in a healthcare crisis affecting mostly low-income communities and uninsured citizens. They identify an interrelation between partisan gerrymandering and health policy implementation, showing that in states where redistricting has kept conservative political parties in power, the state legislature on Medicaid program amplification and qualification requirements for citizens have increasingly become more restrictive, despite efforts to expand federal government Affordable Care Act (ACA) Medicaid across the US.

According to a report by the Union of Concerned Scientists between 2010 and 2017, statistics around health declines in the US magnified among states heavily gerrymandered, where public policy efforts for amplifying Medicaid and Affordable Care Act (ACA) programs were blocked by legislature representatives. The effects of gerrymandering have been shown to extend to other areas of public health, precipitating greater health disparities. A 2019 study found that in heavily gerrymandered states like Florida, Wisconsin, and Virginia despite the adoption of the Affordable Care Act (ACA), avoidance to amplify Medicaid in these states caused an increment in the number of deaths from substance use disorders during 2015 with 289 deaths in Florida, 30 in Wisconsin, and 107 in Virginia.

Similarly, a 2023 report by Chartis Group analyzing post-pandemic access to rural healthcare revealed that access to rural hospitals and healthcare services continues to decline. They found states most at risk to be those that have experienced numerous hospital closures since 2010 and or have delayed or refused to adopt Medicaid amplification under the Affordable Care Act (ACA). They identify that across the US, 43% of rural hospitals are operating at a financial loss, and in states where refusal or delay to amplifying Medicaid the number rises to 51% putting these facilities at risk for definite closure.

Gerrymandering also distorts public policy by undermining proper representation of voter majority preferences, particularly in critical areas like healthcare access. A 2024 study reveals an interrelation between gerrymandering and the adoption of prohibitive laws on reproductive healthcare access post-Dobbs v. Jackson Women's Health Organization. In states affected by gerrymandering, they identify the adoption of prohibitive reproductive health laws to be inaccurate with voters' majority stance on abortion laws. In states like Ohio initiatives to secure a supermajority of conservative officials have led to the approval of prohibitive abortion laws and the redistribution of state budgets away from reproductive health services. According to the study, this occurs despite a negative response from Ohio's voter majority, where only 10% of Ohio voters support complete abortion restrictions. Further evidence is the popular vote approval of the November 2023 Ohio Issue 1, a constitutional amendment that safeguards reproductive rights and abortion access.

=== Gerrymandering and the 2018 midterm elections ===
Gerrymandering was considered by many Democrats to be one of the biggest obstacles they came across during the 2018 U.S. midterm election. In early 2018, both the United States Supreme Court and the Pennsylvania Supreme Court determined that the Republican parties in North Carolina and Pennsylvania had committed unconstitutional gerrymandering in the respective cases Cooper v. Harris and League of Women Voters of Pennsylvania v. Commonwealth of Pennsylvania.

In the case of Pennsylvania, the map was reconfigured into an evenly split congressional delegation, which gave Democrats in Pennsylvania more congressional representation and aided the Democrats in flipping the U.S. House of Representatives. In contrast, North Carolina did not reconfigure the districts prior to the midterm elections, which ultimately gave Republicans there an edge during the election. Republicans in North Carolina acquired 50% of the vote, which garnered them about 77% of the available seats in congress. Wisconsin was the only state in the 2018 midterms which the party receiving the majority of votes held a minority of congressional seats.

State	% D vote	% R vote	% D seats	% R seats	Total seats	Difference between D	Difference between R
North Carolina	48.35%	50.39%	23.08%	76.92%	13	−25.27%	26.53%
Ohio	47.00%	52.27%	25%	75%	16	−22.00%	22.73%
Wisconsin	53.18%	45.61%	37.5%	62.5%	8	−15.68%	16.89%

=== Other factors affecting redistricting ===
At a federal level, gerrymandering has been blamed for a decrease in competitive elections, movement toward extreme party positions, and gridlock in Congress. In 2018, Harry Enten of FiveThirtyEight argued that decreasing competition is partly due to gerrymandering, but even more so due to the population of the United States self-segregating by political ideology, which is seen in by-county voter registrations. Enten points to studies which find that factors other than gerrymandering account for over 75% of the increase in polarization in the past forty years, presumably due largely to changes among voters themselves. Because the Senate, which cannot be gerrymandered due to the fixed state borders, has been passing fewer bills but the House (which is subject to gerrymandering) has been passing more (comparing 1993–2002 to 2013–2016), Enten concludes gridlock is due to factors other than gerrymandering.

== Examples of gerrymandered U.S. districts ==
North Carolina's 12th congressional district between 2003 and 2016 was an example of packing. The district has predominantly African-American residents who vote for Democrats.
California's 23rd congressional district was an example of packing confined to a narrow strip of coast drawn from three large counties. The district shown was radically redrawn by California's non-partisan commission after the 2010 census.
California's 11th congressional district featured long, strained projections and counter-projections of other districts, achieving mild but reliable packing. The district comprised a selection of people and communities favorable to the Republican Party. It was redrawn from the version shown after the 2010 census.
Bi-partisan incumbent gerrymandering produced California's 38th congressional district, home to Grace Napolitano, a Democrat, who ran unopposed in 2004. This district was redrawn by California's non-partisan commission after the 2010 census.
Texas's controversial 2003 partisan gerrymander produced Texas District 22 for former Rep. Tom DeLay, a Republican. A packed seat of Republicans based on past results of its many voting districts, it features two necks and a counter-projection.
The odd shapes – distended projections and non-natural feature-based wiggly boundaries – of California Senate districts in southern California (2008) have led to complaints of gerrymandering.
Illinois's 4th congressional district has the moniker "the earmuffs" and amounts to packing of two mainly Hispanic areas. It has had in relative terms hairline contiguity along Interstate 294 and two necks at right angles, forming a very long neck between two areas, which was somewhat widened in 2013.
After the Democrat Jim Matheson was elected in 2000, the Utah legislature redrew the 2nd congressional district to favor future Republican majorities. The predominantly Democratic city of Salt Lake City was connected to predominantly Republican eastern and southern Utah through a thin sliver of land running through Utah County. Nevertheless, Matheson continued to be re-elected. In 2011, the legislature created new congressional districts that combined conservative rural areas with more urban areas to dilute Democratic votes.
Illinois's 17th congressional district in the western portion of the state was gerrymandered: the major urban centers are anchored and Decatur is included, although nearly isolated from the main district. It was redrawn in 2013.
Maryland's 3rd congressional district was listed in the top ten of the most gerrymandered districts in the United States by The Washington Post in 2014. The district is drawn to favor Democratic candidates. Former MD-3 representative John Sarbanes has put forth the For the People Act of 2019 aimed at U.S. electoral reform to address partisan gerrymandering, voting rights and other issues.
North Carolina's 4th congressional district encompassed parts of Raleigh, Hillsborough, and the entirety of Chapel Hill. The district was considered to be one of the most gerrymandered districts in North Carolina and the United States as a whole. The district was redrawn in 2017.
Pennsylvania's 7th congressional district, which was drawn to create a district favorable to Republicans within the Philadelphia suburbs, became known as "Goofy Kicking Donald Duck" due to its distorted shape. At one point being only as wide as a parking lot, it was ruled unconstitutional by the Supreme Court of Pennsylvania in 2018.

== See also ==
- 2025-2026 United States redistricting
- California redistricting propositions
  - Proposition 11 (2008)
  - Proposition 20 (2010) – Approved Congressional Redistricting Initiative
  - 2025 California Proposition 50
- Checkerboarding (land) – Pattern of land grants and ownership
- Democratic backsliding in the United States
- Electoral geography – Geography of elections
- For the People Act of 2019 – Election reform and anti-corruption bill in the 117th Congress
- Gerrymandering (film)
- Katie Fahey – American activist (born 1989)
- Kilgarlin v. Martin – United States federal court case
- RepresentUs – American not-for-profit organization
- Thomas Hofeller – American political strategist (1943–2018)
- United States congressional apportionment – How 435 seats are distributed to 50 states
- Voter suppression – Strategy designed to restrict specific groups of people from voting
