= Vieth =

Vieth is a surname. Notable people with the surname include:

- Dorothee Vieth (born 1960), German Paralympic cyclist
- Errol Vieth (born 1950), Australian academic
- Michelle Vieth (born 1979), American-Mexican actress

== See also ==
- Vieth v. Jubelirer, United States Supreme Court case
