= Shapiro v. McManus =

- Supreme Court of the United States

Argued November 4, 2015 Decided December 8, 2015
- Full case name: Stephen M. Shapiro, et al. v. David J. McManus, Jr., Chairman, Maryland State Board of Elections, et al.
- Docket no.: 14-990
- Citations: 577 U.S. ___ (more) 136 S. Ct. 450; 193 L. Ed. 2d 279

Case history
- Prior: Motion to dismiss granted, Benisek v. Mack, 11 F. Supp. 3d 516 (D. Md. 2014); affirmed, 584 F. App'x 140 (4th Cir. 2014); cert. granted, 135 S. Ct. 2805 (2015).
- Subsequent: On remand, Benisek v. Lamone, 241 F. Supp. 3d 566 (D. Md. 2017); injunction denied, 266 F. Supp. 3d 799 (D. Md. 2017); affirmed, No. 17-333, 585 U.S. ___ (2018)

Holding
- Federal district courts are required to refer cases to a three-judge panel when plaintiffs challenge the constitutionality of the apportionment of congressional districts.

Court membership
- Chief Justice John Roberts Associate Justices Antonin Scalia · Anthony Kennedy; Clarence Thomas · Ruth Bader Ginsburg; Stephen Breyer · Samuel Alito; Sonia Sotomayor · Elena Kagan

Case opinion
- Majority: Scalia, joined by unanimous

Laws applied
- 28 U.S.C. § 2284

Shapiro v. McManus, 577 U.S. ___ (2015), was a case in which the Supreme Court of the United States clarified when United States District Court judges must refer cases to three-judge panels. In a unanimous opinion written by Justice Antonin Scalia, the Court ruled that federal district courts are required to refer cases to a three-judge panel when plaintiffs challenge the constitutionality of the apportionment of congressional districts.

The case results from citizens in Maryland that had challenged the state's redistricting based on the 2010 Census created by Democratic leaders in the state, leading to Republican voters in the 6th district to find their votes diluted and causing ten-term U.S. Representative Roscoe Bartlett to lose in the 2012 election. The plaintiffs charged that their rights of equal representation and protection under the Article One, Section Two of the U.S. Constitution and freedom of association of the First Amendment had been violated. At the United States District Court for the District of Maryland, the judge denied the request for a full three-judge hearing, considering that the plaintiff's claims were insubstantial; the decision was summarily affirmed in the Fourth Circuit Appeals Court. The plaintiffs subsequently challenged the District Court's ruling via petition to the Supreme Court on the basis that the dismissal did not properly consider their claims. The Supreme Court agreed, ordering a full three-judge hearing at the District Court.

The hearing at District Court led to another Supreme Court case, Benisek v. Lamone, accepted in December 2017 and heard in March 2018, in which the Supreme Court found that the District Court's denial of an injunction was not improper, but otherwise did not weigh in on the merits of the gerrymandering aspects.

== See also ==
- List of United States Supreme Court cases
- Lists of United States Supreme Court cases by volume
- List of United States Supreme Court cases by the Roberts Court
