= WesternGeco LLC v. ION Geophysical Corp. =

- Supreme Court of the United States

Decided June 22, 2018
- Full case name: WesternGeco LLC v. ION Geophysical Corp.
- Docket no.: 16-1011
- Citations: 585 U.S. 407 (more)

Holding
- Awarding lost profits over patent-infringing goods assembled outside of the United States with components manufactured in the United States was a permissible domestic application of Section 284 of the Patent Act.

Court membership
- Chief Justice John Roberts Associate Justices Anthony Kennedy · Clarence Thomas; Ruth Bader Ginsburg · Stephen Breyer; Samuel Alito · Sonia Sotomayor; Elena Kagan · Neil Gorsuch

Laws applied
- Patent Act

WesternGeco LLC v. ION Geophysical Corp., 585 U.S. 407 (2018), was a United States Supreme Court case in which the court held that awarding lost profits over patent-infringing goods assembled outside of the United States with components manufactured in the United States was a permissible domestic application of Section 284 of the Patent Act.

== Background ==
WesternGeco LLC controlled patents for a system used to survey the ocean floor. ION Geophysical Corp. began selling a competing system that was built from components manufactured in the United States, shipped to companies abroad, and assembled abroad into a system indistinguishable from WesternGeco's. WesternGeco sued for patent infringement under the Patent Act. The jury found ION liable and awarded WesternGeco damages in royalties and lost profits under Section 284. ION moved to set aside the verdict, arguing that WesternGeco could not recover damages for lost profits because the Patent Act does not apply extraterritorially. The district court denied the motion, but the Federal Circuit reversed. ION was liable for infringement under the Patent Act, the court reasoned, but the Patent Act does not allow patent owners to recover for lost foreign profits. The case was appealed to the Supreme Court, which issued a grant, vacate, remand order for reconsideration in light of Halo Electronics, Inc. v. Pulse Electronics, Inc.. After reconsideration, the Federal Circuit reinstated the portion of its decision regarding §271(f)'s extraterritoriality.
