= Nicholas Stephanopoulos =

American legal scholar specializing in election law

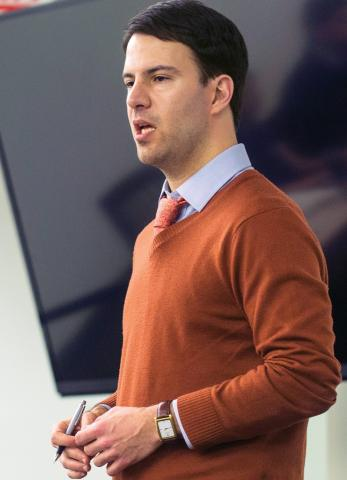
- Education: Harvard University (BA); Pembroke College, Cambridge (MPhil); Yale University (JD)
- Title: Kirkland & Ellis Professor of Law
- Spouse: Ruth Greenwood
- Awards: Politico's "50 List"; National Law Journal "Chicago's 40 under 40"; Illinois Legal Eagle Award

Academic work
- Discipline: Election law, Constitutional law
- Institutions: University of Chicago Law School; Harvard Law School

Nicholas Stephanopoulos is an American legal scholar who is the Kirkland & Ellis Professor of Law at Harvard Law School. His scholarship primarily focuses on election law, constitutional law, and the interplay between law and democracy. Recognized as a leading expert in election law, his work has been cited numerous times by the United States Supreme Court. He has contributed significantly to the study of partisan gerrymandering and is a co-founder of PlanScore, a platform for evaluating district plans. He co-invented the efficiency gap, a metric used to measure potential gerrymandering in electoral systems, which quantifies the fairness of districting by calculating wasted votes. He has advocated for the passage of State Voting Rights Acts.

In October 2022, Stephanopoulos was elected to the American Law Institute.

== Early life and education ==
Stephanopoulos earned his AB in Government from Harvard College, graduating summa cum laude. He then obtained an M.Phil. in European Studies from University of Cambridge, followed by a JD from Yale Law School, where he was the Editor-in-Chief of the Yale Journal of International Law.

== Legal career ==
Before his current position at Harvard, Stephanopoulos was a professor of law at the University of Chicago Law School. He has also been an Associate-in-Law at Columbia Law School and worked as an associate in the Washington, D.C., office of Jenner & Block LLP. Early in his career, he clerked for Judge Raymond C. Fisher of the Ninth Circuit Court of Appeals.

Stephanopoulos has contributed to The New York Times, Washington Post, Los Angeles Times, Chicago Tribune, The Atlantic, The New Republic, Slate, and Vox.

He has played a significant role in several high-profile litigation efforts, including the Supreme Court case Gill v. Whitford. In the 2023 case Allen v. Milligan, the Supreme Court's decision heavily relied on an amicus brief submitted by the Election Law Clinic, representing Stephanopoulos and other scholars. This brief was cited several times in the Court's opinion. It provided empirical evidence about the effectiveness of Section 2 of the VRA and highlighted the potential consequences of undermining this provision, which aims to protect the electoral opportunities for communities of color.

== Selected publications ==
- Stephanopoulos, Nicholas (2019). "Disparate Impact, Unified Law" (PDF). Yale Law Journal. 128: 1566.
- Stephanopoulos, Nicholas (2016). "Race, Place, and Power" (PDF). Stanford Law Review. 68: 1323.
- Stephanopoulos, Nicholas; McGhee, Eric (2015). "Partisan Gerrymandering and the Efficiency Gap". University of Chicago Law Review. 82: 831.
