= Benisek v. Lamone =

- Supreme Court of the United States

Argued March 28, 2018 Decided June 18, 2018
- Full case name: O. John Benisek, et al. v. Linda H. Lamone, Administrator, Maryland State Board of Elections, et al.
- Docket no.: 17-333
- Citations: 585 U.S. ____ (more) 138 S. Ct. 1942; 201 L. Ed. 2d 398

Case history
- Prior: Motion to dismiss granted, Benisek v. Mack, 11 F. Supp. 3d 516 (D. Md. 2014); affirmed, 584 F. App'x 140 (4th Cir. 2014); cert. granted, 135 S. Ct. 2805 (2015); remanded to 3-judge panel, Shapiro v. McManus, No. 14-990, 577 U.S. ___ (2015); on remand, Benisek v. Lamone, 241 F. Supp. 3d 566 (D. Md. 2017); injunction denied, 266 F. Supp. 3d 799 (D. Md. 2017).

Holding
- The District Court's denial of injunctive relief against the use of Maryland's 2011 redistricting maps was not an abuse of discretion.

Court membership
- Chief Justice John Roberts Associate Justices Anthony Kennedy · Clarence Thomas; Ruth Bader Ginsburg · Stephen Breyer; Samuel Alito · Sonia Sotomayor; Elena Kagan · Neil Gorsuch

Case opinion
- Per curiam

Lamone v. Benisek
- Supreme Court of the United States

Argued March 26, 2019 Decided June 27, 2019
- Full case name: Linda H. Lamone, Administrator, Maryland State Board of Elections, et al. v. O. John Benisek, et al.
- Docket no.: 18-726
- Citations: 588 U.S. ____ (more)

Holding
- Partisan gerrymandering claims present political questions beyond the reach of the federal courts.

Court membership
- Chief Justice John Roberts Associate Justices Clarence Thomas · Ruth Bader Ginsburg; Stephen Breyer · Samuel Alito; Sonia Sotomayor · Elena Kagan; Neil Gorsuch · Brett Kavanaugh

Case opinions
- Majority: Roberts, joined by Thomas, Alito, Gorsuch, Kavanaugh
- Dissent: Kagan, joined by Ginsburg, Breyer, Sotomayor

Benisek v. Lamone, 585 U.S. ____ (2018), and Lamone v. Benisek, 588 U.S. ____ (2019), were a pair of decisions by the Supreme Court of the United States in a case dealing with the topic of partisan gerrymandering arising from the 2011 Democratic party-favored redistricting of Maryland. At the center of the cases was Maryland's 6th district which historically favored Republicans and which was redrawn in 2011 to shift the political majority to become Democratic via vote dilution. Affected voters filed suit, stating that the redistricting violated their right of representation under Article One, Section Two of the U.S. Constitution and freedom of association of the First Amendment.

== Overview ==
Benisek v. Lamone, a case challenging the denial of the United States District Court for the District of Maryland to place an injunction on the controversial redistricting maps for the upcoming 2018 elections, was heard during the 2017–2018 term following the court's decision in Gill v. Whitford. The court, in a per curiam decision, affirmed the District Court's ruling, and remanded the case for further hearings to take Gill into consideration. The District Court later ruled that the maps represented unconstitutional partisan gerrymandering and ordered new maps to be drawn. The state challenged this in Lamone v. Benisek, which the Supreme Court heard in the 2018–2019 term alongside Rucho v. Common Cause, a partisan redistricting case from North Carolina. The Supreme Court ruled in both Lamone and Rucho by a 5–4 majority that questions of partisan gerrymandering represent nonjusticiable political questions and remanded each case back to its district court with instructions to dismiss the case.

== Background ==
In the United States, the number of representatives for each state in the House of Representatives is based on that state's population. Population counts are derived from the results of the United States census, which is conducted every ten years. Because population figures are updated following each new census, redistricting, or changing the boundaries of the state's districts, may be required to conform with changes in population. Redistricting is typically done by representatives of the political party in power within the state and can result in the practice of gerrymandering, creating oddly-shaped districts that favor one party's or group's chances of election. The Supreme Court has ruled that gerrymandering based on racial and ethnic grounds is unconstitutional and has stated that partisan gerrymandering is also likely unconstitutional, but has yet to develop a valid means to determine when partisan gerrymandering has occurred.

== Maryland redistricting ==
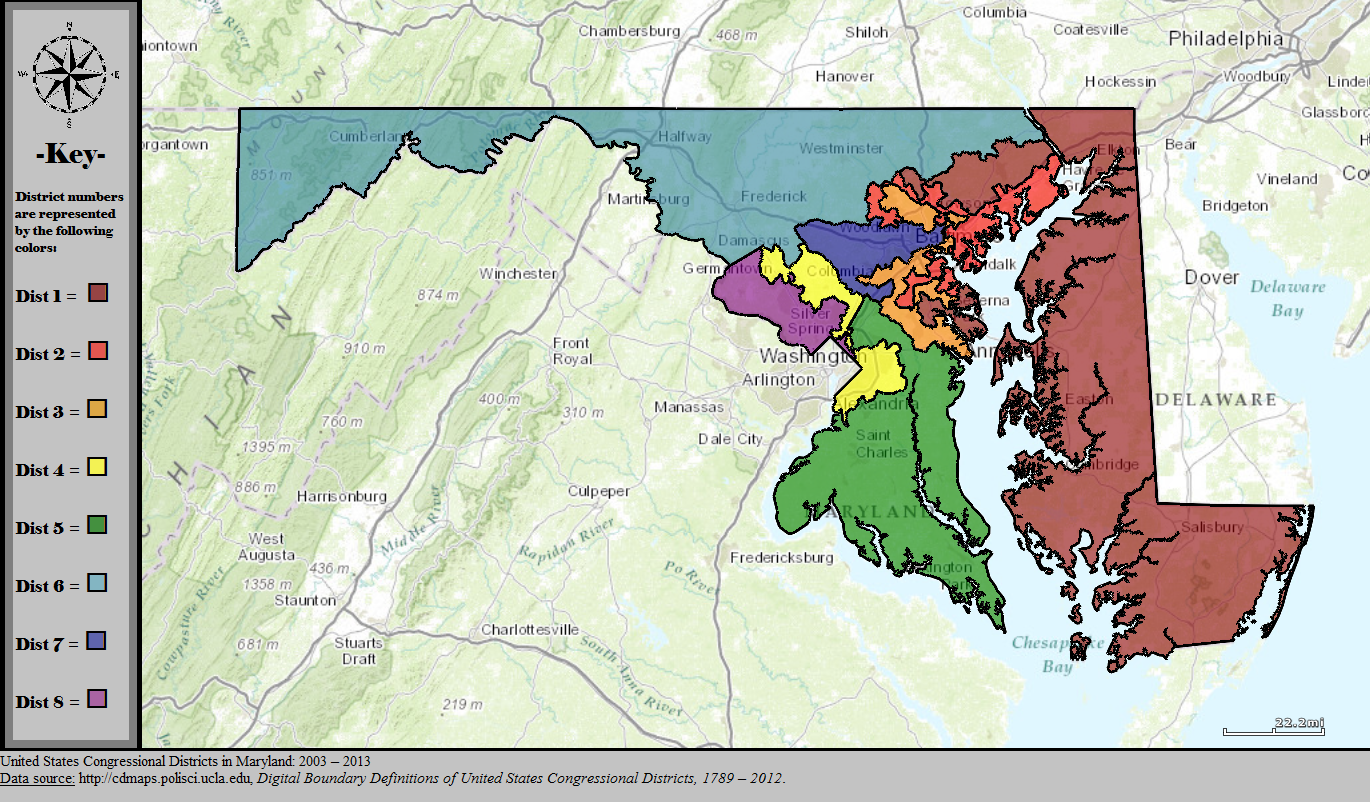
The district map of Maryland from 2003 to 2013

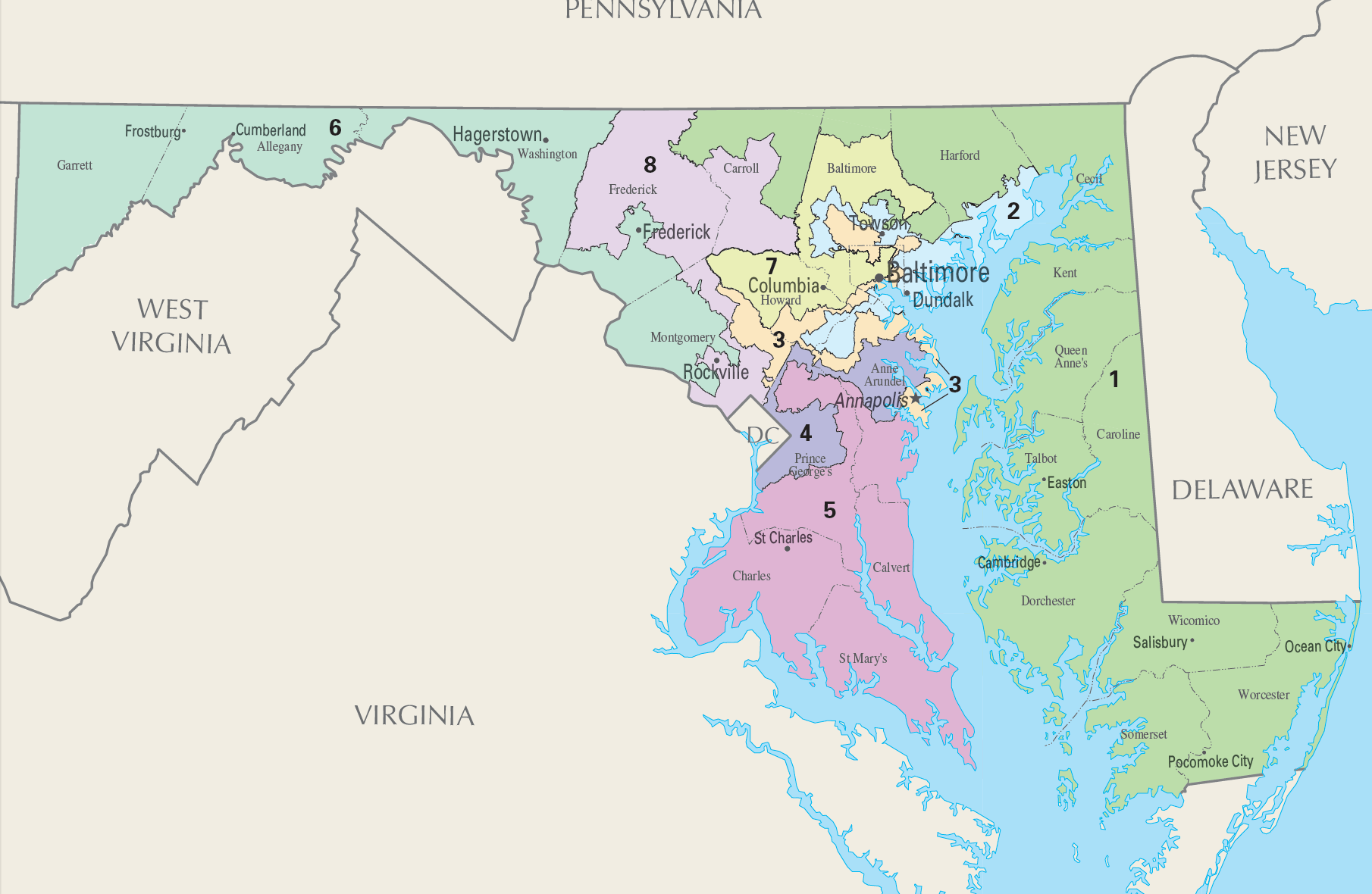
The district map of Maryland as of 2013

For the 2010 census, the Census Bureau recommended that states count incarcerated prisoners as living in the location of their group quarters, rather than at their home location. Within Maryland, most prisoners are African-American, and the largest prisoner populations were located in the state's 4th and 6th districts, which are otherwise predominantly populated by Caucasians. Because prisoners do not have the right to vote but would nevertheless be counted as residents of the prisons' districts, concerns were raised of "prison-based gerrymandering", such that the districts housing the prisoners would have inflated population counts, while the home districts of the prisoners – often metropolitan areas like Baltimore – would have diminished populations. In 2010, Maryland passed a first-of-its-kind civil act, the No Representation Without Population Act, which would have prisoners counted for the decennial census within their home district.

Maryland has traditionally been a Democratic-heavy state, and according to FiveThirtyEight, non-gerrymandered or proportionally partisan districts in Maryland could range from four to six likely Democrat seats, suggesting that a proper redistricting of the state's eight districts would result in four to six districts favoring Democrats, and two to four either favoring Republicans or remaining competitive. Democratic analysts envisioned the possibility of an "8–0 map" which aspired to shut Republicans out of elections altogether; however, this may have endangered some incumbents, who rejected the proposal because they wanted to stay in office more easily. However, Democratic leaders saw the potential to create a district map that would give Democrats seven districts to the Republicans' one, or the "7–1 map". The state Democrats drew on services from the National Committee for an Effective Congress (NCEC) to determine how to create this "7–1 map". The issue was how to remap the two Republican-leaning districts, the 1st and the 6th. After reviewing options, advisers and mapmakers settled on remapping only the 6th district, because redrawing the 1st district to achieve their goal would have split the district across the Chesapeake Bay, an undesirable outcome. Ultimately, a 7–1 map favoring Democrats was implemented.

== Benisek v. Lamone ==
=== First legal challenge ===
The new redistricting was initially challenged in Fletcher v. Lamone, a case brought by a number of African-American voters who believed that the new map diluted the strength of the African-American vote, violating the requirement of equal representation under Article One of the United States Constitution, equal protection granted by the 14th Amendment and equal voting rights from the 15th Amendment. They further challenged the No Representation Without Population Act, believing this further constituted a dilution of their vote. The case was heard by a three-judge panel at the District Court of Maryland in December 2011, and in a unanimous decision, the District Court found in favor of the state, issuing a summary judgement that asserted that the plaintiffs had not shown harm from the new district map nor from the Act. On appeal to the Supreme Court, the court issued a summary disposition that upheld the District Court's ruling.

=== Second legal challenge ===
A separate challenge arose from other residents of the state in 2013. Aware that the District Court of Maryland had ruled that the redistricting map was not considered partisan based on Fletcher v. Lamone, these citizens challenged the redistricting's use of "narrow ribbons and orifices" that were used to connect non-contiguous regions having a targeted population distribution in the state's 4th, 6th, 7th, and 8th districts. Of particular concern was the 6th district. Previously it had covered most of the rural northwestern part of the state along the Pennsylvania border and was a predominantly Republican district with a largely Caucasian population that had supported Representative Roscoe Bartlett for two decades. After redistricting, the 6th district still covered the western arm of the state, but now also included many of the suburban and metropolitan areas across the border from Washington D.C., thereby increasing the number of African-American voters within it. The number of registered Republicans dropped by 70,000 voters, roughly 20% of the registered voters in the district. As a result, Bartlett lost his seat to Democrat John Delaney in the 2012 elections by more than 20% of the vote. The complaint stated that because these majority Republican districts had been remapped to predominantly represent Democrats, the new district boundaries violated their rights of equal representation, the right to vote under the 14th Amendment, and the rights of association under the 1st Amendment.

The case, filed as Benisek v. Mack, was reviewed by Judge James K. Bredar who deemed that none of the complaints brought by the plaintiffs were actionable and denied the request for a standard three-judge hearing in April 2014. Judge Bredar did find that the case represented a substantially different subset of residents than Fletcher and rejected the defense's argument for res judicata. In response to the plaintiffs' arguments, Judge Bredar found that the plaintiffs did not provide an effective measure to demonstrate partisan gerrymandering as suggested by Vieth v. Jubelirer, thereby nullifying their Article One and 14th Amendment claims, and that the affected citizens still had their rights to participate in the political process intact, thus denying any relief based on the 1st Amendment claim. The plaintiffs appealed to the Fourth Circuit Appeals Court, but the appeal was summarily denied in October 2014 on the basis that their claims were insubstantial, as determined by Bredar. The plaintiffs issued a petition for writ of certiorari from the Supreme Court of the United States, arguing that because the District Courts are required to hear any substantial constitutional challenges to state redistricting under Section 2284 of Title 28, the Appeals Court's dismissal based on the "insubstantial" claim was inappropriate. The case, Shapiro v. McManus, was accepted by the Supreme Court in June 2015, with oral arguments heard in November 2015 and the decision issued in December 2015. The court unanimously agreed with the petitioners that the claims presented were not insubstantial, thus clearing the bar set by Goosby v. Osser, and ordered a full three-judge hearing of the case at the District Court; the court did not otherwise comment on the merits of the petitioners' complaints related to the redistricting.

==== Second hearing ====
The new hearing before Circuit Judge Paul V. Niemeyer, Chief District Judge Bredar, and District Judge George Levi Russell III began in 2016. The plaintiffs had revised their case to focus specifically on the redrawn boundaries of the 6th district, which had had the greatest shift in voter demographics. While the state attempted to dismiss the case, the court denied dismissal in a 2–1 decision (with Bredar dissenting) in August 2016, allowing the case to move into the discovery phase. Both sides sought to expedite the case through summary judgments in mid-2017. In June 2017, however, the Supreme Court announced that it would be hearing the Gill v. Whitford case later that year. The plaintiffs in Benisek, in anticipation of the upcoming 2018 elections, requested that the District Court issue an injunction preventing the state of Maryland from using the 2011 redistricting maps, as the state was seeking a stay of proceedings for the case until Gill v. Whitford was concluded. The District Court denied the plaintiffs' request and issued a stay on the case in August 2017, pending the conclusion of Gill v. Whitford.

=== Supreme Court ===
Seeking an expedited ruling, the plaintiffs filed a request for a jurisdictional statement to the Supreme Court on September 1, 2017, to reverse the District Court's denial of summary judgement and injunctions and placing the case on hold. While the Supreme Court declined to reverse the District Court's orders, the court did agree to hear the case on its merits on December 8, 2017.

Oral arguments were heard on March 28, 2018. In contrast to Gill v. Whitford, the justices seemed to indicate that the redistricting of Maryland's 6th district was a much more aggressive partisan gerrymandering than that in Wisconsin, but still debated whether they had a proper measure to evaluate partisan division, whether the court should be involved in that decision, and whether such matters are to be regulated through federal or state legislation.

The Court issued its per curiam decision affirming the Appeals' Court ruling on June 18, 2018, the same day that the Gill decision was announced. In the decision, the court did not address the merits of the gerrymandering case, but instead found that the District Court, in denying the issuing of an injunction on the use of the redistricting maps, had not engaged in an "abuse of discretion", given both the pending legal challenge of Gill and the need for "due regard for the public interest in orderly elections". The decision further argued that the plaintiffs had waited too long from the time that the redistricting maps were certified to file their case.

== Lamone v. Benisek ==
Following the per curiam decision and the conclusion of Gill v. Whitford, the District Court rescheduled hearings on the case on October 4, 2018. The District Court subsequently ruled on November 7, 2018, finding for summary judgement in the plaintiffs' favor that the revised boundaries of the 6th district were unconstitutional, and required the state to redraw its district maps in a more neutral manner by March 7, 2019, with the new maps to be approved by the court; otherwise, the court would assign an independent three-member commission to oversee the redistricting, ensuring that new maps would be available prior to the 2020 election. State governor Larry Hogan, a Republican, had stated his intent to let the ruling stand and engage with the state's general assembly to pursue redistricting, but the attorney general Brian Frosh, a Democrat, stated his intention to appeal the District Court ruling, potentially directly to the United States Supreme Court. Frosh also sought a stay of the District Court's redistricting order while the matter of appeal was under discussion.

=== Supreme Court ===
Frosh petitioned the Supreme Court to hear the new challenge of whether the District Court could make its summary judgement, and the court agreed in early January 2019 to hear the case. This new case was heard as Lamone v. Benisek (Docket 18-726) alongside Rucho v. Common Cause, another partisan gerrymandering case from North Carolina. The case was decided on June 27, 2019; a 5–4 majority determined that claims of partisan gerrymandering present a nonjusticiable political question that could not be handled by the federal court system. Along with Rucho, the Supreme Court vacated the District Court's judgement and remanded the case to that court, effectively leaving the existing redistricting maps in place.
