= Davis v. Bandemer =

- Supreme Court of the United States

Argued October 7, 1985 Decided June 30, 1986
- Full case name: Davis, et al. v. Bandemer, et al.
- Citations: 478 U.S. 109 (more) 106 S. Ct. 2797; 92 L. Ed. 2d 85; 1986 U.S. LEXIS 122; 54 U.S.L.W. 4898

Case history
- Prior: Bandemer v. Davis, 603 F. Supp. 1479 (S.D. Ind. 1984); probable jurisdiction noted, 470 U.S. 1083 (1985).

Holding
- Claims of partisan gerrymandering were justiciable, but failed to agree on a clear standard for judicial review of those claims. The decision was later limited with respect to many of the elements directly involving issues of redistricting and political gerrymandering, but was somewhat broadened with respect to less significant ancillary procedural issues.

Court membership
- Chief Justice Warren E. Burger Associate Justices William J. Brennan Jr. · Byron White; Thurgood Marshall · Harry Blackmun; Lewis F. Powell Jr. · William Rehnquist; John P. Stevens · Sandra Day O'Connor

Case opinions
- Majority: White (Part II), joined by Brennan, Marshall, Blackmun, Powell, Stevens
- Plurality: White (Parts I, III and IV), joined by Brennan, Marshall, Blackmun
- Concurrence: Burger (in judgment)
- Concurrence: O'Connor (in judgment), joined by Burger, Rehnquist
- Concur/dissent: Powell, joined by Stevens

Laws applied
- U.S. Const. amend. XIV
- Abrogated by
- Rucho v. Common Cause (2019)

Davis v. Bandemer, 478 U.S. 109 (1986), is a case in which the United States Supreme Court held that claims of partisan gerrymandering were justiciable, but failed to agree on a clear standard for the judicial review of the class of claims of a political nature to which such cases belong. The decision was later limited with respect to many of the elements directly involving issues of redistricting and political gerrymandering, but was somewhat broadened with respect to less significant ancillary procedural issues. Democrats had won 51.9% of the votes, but only 43/100 seats. Democrats sued on basis of one man, one vote, however, California Democrats supported the Indiana GOP's plan.

The National Republican Committee filed an amicus brief in support of the Indiana Democrats, Democrats in the California house and senate filed briefs supporting the Republican redistricting plan.

== Background ==
Democrats in the state of Indiana challenged the state's 1981 state apportionment scheme for Indiana General Assembly districts because of political gerrymandering. The Democrats argued that "the apportionment unconstitutionally diluted their votes in important districts, violating their rights." Indiana Democrats used the elections of November 1982 as proof that the new plan violated the 14th amendment due to voter dilution. In both the House and the Senate Democrats won the majority of votes, but failed to have a majority of candidates win. The District Court ruled in favor of the Democrats, throwing out the old plan and calling for the creation of a new one.

== Decision ==
The Supreme Court ruled on two separate issues, first whether gerrymandering claims are justiciable and secondly, if the 1981 Indiana Reapportionment Plan was an infraction on citizen's rights to equal representation which was protected by the 14th Amendment. The Court ruled 6-3 that federal courts can determine cases of partisan gerrymandering as worthy of intervention, but they also ruled 7-2 that Indiana's plan was constitutional under the Equal Protection Clause.

== See also ==
- List of United States Supreme Court cases, volume 478
- List of United States Supreme Court cases
- Lists of United States Supreme Court cases by volume
- List of United States Supreme Court cases by the Rehnquist Court
- Vieth v. Jubelirer (2004)
- League of United Latin American Citizens v. Perry (2006)
- Gill v. Whitford (2018)
- Rucho v. Common Cause (2019)
