= Animal Science Products v. Hebei Welcome Pharmaceuticals =

- Supreme Court of the United States

Argued April 24, 2018 Decided June 14, 2018
- Full case name: Animal Science Products, Inc., et al, Petitioners v. Hebei Welcome Pharmaceutical Co. Ltd., et al.
- Docket no.: 16-1220
- Citations: 585 U.S. 33 (more) 138 S. Ct. 1865; 201 L. Ed. 2d 225
- Argument: Oral argument

Case history
- Prior: Motion to dismiss denied, In re Vitamin C Antitrust Litig., 584 F. Supp. 2d 546 (E.D.N.Y. 2008); summary judgment denied, 810 F. Supp. 2d 522 (E.D.N.Y. 2011); reversed, 837 F.3d 175 (2d Cir. 2016); cert. granted, 138 S. Ct. 734 (2018).

Holding
- A federal court must provide respectful consideration to a foreign government's representation of its own law, but not conclusive effect.

Court membership
- Chief Justice John Roberts Associate Justices Anthony Kennedy · Clarence Thomas; Ruth Bader Ginsburg · Stephen Breyer; Samuel Alito · Sonia Sotomayor; Elena Kagan · Neil Gorsuch

Case opinion
- Majority: Ginsburg, joined by unanimous

Laws applied
- Federal Rule of Civil Procedure 44.1

Animal Science Products v. Hebei Welcome Pharmaceuticals, 585 U.S. 33 (2018), was a case before the Supreme Court of the United States involving the interpretation of foreign law in US domestic courts. The case arose out of a controversy in which Hebei Welcome Pharmaceuticals (Hebei), a company incorporated under Chinese law, and its parent company North China Pharmaceutical Group was accused of price fixing in violation of the Sherman Antitrust Act by Animal Science Products (ASP), which filed a class action against Hebei. Before the district court, Hebei claimed that Chinese law required them to price-fix, and this claim was supported by the Chinese Ministry of Commerce in written submissions to the court. The district court rejected this defense because, in the independent opinion of the judge, Chinese law did not actually impose this requirement; a jury subsequently awarded damages to ASP. On appeal, the Second Circuit Court of Appeals ruled that the district court erred by entering into an independent review of foreign law, and that it should have instead, for reasons of international comity, deferred to China's representation of its own law, provided that this representation was "reasonable". In a unanimous opinion, the Supreme Court reversed the ruling of the Second Circuit, finding that respectful consideration must be granted to a foreign government's statements, but not conclusive effect. The case marked the first occasion that the Chinese government appeared as an amicus curiae in oral argument before the US Supreme Court, and was the third time that any foreign government had done so.
