= North China Pharmaceutical Group =

Pharmaceutical company in China

- Company type: Public
- Traded as: SSE: 600812
- Industry: Pharmaceutical
- Founded: 1953
- Headquarters: Shijiazhuang, China
- Number of employees: 18500
- Parent: China Investment Corporation
- Website: ncpc.com.cn

North China Pharmaceutical Group Corp. (NCPC), (simplified Chinese: 华北制药集团有限责任公司; traditional Chinese: 華北制藥集團有限責任公司; pinyin: Huáběi zhìyào jítuán yǒuxiàn zérèn gōngsī) is a pharmaceutical manufacturer in China. NCPC was one of the key construction projects during China's First Five-Year Plan. After five years of construction since the foundation date in June 1953, the first successful pharmaceutical production, started in June 1958. Being one of the antibiotic producers both in technology and production scale at that time, NCPC created a history of commercial production of antibiotics in China. It has 45 years of development experience. NCPC has been taking the lead in the Chinese pharmaceutical industry in key economic indexes, ranked as one of the Top500 Enterprises and the best profit-makers in China. By the end of 2002, the total assets of the company were valued at US$2 billion, with 18,500 employees. In 2002, NCPC claimed a domestic sales revenue of US$700 million and export sales of US$100 million.

== Organization ==
NCPC has 29 subsidiaries, among which North China Pharmaceutical Co., Ltd. is a listed company at Shanghai Stock Exchange with 59.87% of shares held by NCPC. NCPC is one of the four groups of the candidate enterprises approved by the China Securities Regulatory Commission for overseas listing. Cooperating with foreign companies and institutions, NCPC has established 16 joint ventures.

== Products ==
NCPC currently produces over 430 kinds of antibiotics, semi-synthetic antibiotics, pharmaceutical intermediates, synthetic vitamins, biotechnology products, veterinary and nutraceuticals both in bulk and in finished products. NCPC sells bulk antibiotics 7,000 tonnes (6,900 long tons; 7,700 short tons), vitamins 10,000 tons, antibiotic intermediates 7,500 tons, powder for injection 1.8 billion vials, capsules 1.03 billion grains annually. The capacity of penicillin, streptomycin, 6-APA, amoxycillin, cefaradine, vitamin B100 are in the lead worldwide. NCPC's next development focus is on biotechnology products, bio-pesticides and animal products. Since 1984, NCPC has initiated research on modern biotechnology and formed the system for developing generic drug involving new products RpD, pilot production and commercial production. In cooperation with foreign companies, NCPC completed the design and construction of GeneTech Biotechnology Co., Ltd. who is now a modern biotechnology production base in line with international practice and standards. Presently there are rhGM-CSF, rhG-CSF, EPO and Hepatitis B Vaccine (CHO) on the market.

== R&D ==
Through its independent research and development, NCPC was the first in China to succeed in developing dozens of new products such as bacitracin, kasugamycin, bleomycin, amphotericin B, lindomycin, clindamycin, clindamycin phosphate, and norvancomycin. NCPC New Drug R&D Co., Ltd. is responsible for the new drug and technology development of the entire NCPC Group. Nearly 300 experts and technicians, advanced instruments and an integrated pilot unit transform laboratory reactions into large-scale production. In recent 10 years, R&D investment of NCPC kept occupying over 30% of sales volume annually. NCPC has been transferring from generic imitation into original research in new drug development and forming its own development platform. Its original research focuses on natural and small molecular drugs screening, combinatorial chemical technology and modern biotechnologies.

== See also ==
- Pharmaceutical industry in China
- Animal Science Products v. Hebei Welcome Pharmaceuticals
