= Vieth v. Jubelirer =

- Supreme Court of the United States

Argued December 10, 2003 Decided April 28, 2004
- Full case name: Richard Vieth, et al. v. Robert C. Jubelirer, President of the Pennsylvania Senate, et al.
- Citations: 541 U.S. 267 (more) 124 S. Ct. 1769; 158 L. Ed. 2d 546

Case history
- Prior: On appeal from the Middle District of Pennsylvania, Vieth v. Pennsylvania, 188 F. Supp. 2d 532 (M.D. Pa. 2002) (Vieth I); Vieth v. Pennsylvania, 195 F. Supp. 2d 672 (M.D. Pa. 2002) (Vieth II)

Holding
- Gerrymandering claims present a non-justiciable question, as there are no judicially manageable standards available to resolve gerrymandering questions.

Court membership
- Chief Justice William Rehnquist Associate Justices John P. Stevens · Sandra Day O'Connor; Antonin Scalia · Anthony Kennedy; David Souter · Clarence Thomas; Ruth Bader Ginsburg · Stephen Breyer

Case opinions
- Plurality: Scalia, joined by Rehnquist, O'Connor, Thomas
- Concurrence: Kennedy (in judgment)
- Dissent: Stevens
- Dissent: Souter, joined by Ginsburg
- Dissent: Breyer

Vieth v. Jubelirer, 541 U.S. 267 (2004), was a United States Supreme Court ruling that was significant in the area of partisan redistricting and political gerrymandering. The court, in a plurality opinion by Justice Antonin Scalia and joined by Chief Justice William Rehnquist and Justices Sandra Day O'Connor and Clarence Thomas, with Justice Anthony Kennedy concurring in the judgment, upheld the ruling of the District Court in favor of the appellees that the alleged political gerrymandering was not unconstitutional. Subsequent to the ruling, partisan bias in redistricting increased dramatically in the 2010 redistricting round.

== Background ==
The plaintiff-appellants in this case were Norma Jean, Richard Vieth, and Susan Furey, Democrats registered to vote in the state of Pennsylvania. They contended that the Republican-controlled Pennsylvania General Assembly had unconstitutionally gerrymandered the districts for the election of congressional representatives. This, the plaintiffs claimed, denied Democrats full participation in the American political process by violating the one-person one-vote requirement of Article I of the United States Constitution, and denied Democrats equal protection of the laws under the Fourteenth Amendment to the United States Constitution.

The 2000 census determined that Pennsylvania was entitled to 19 Representatives in the United States Congress (two fewer than the previous delegation) and congressional election districts therefore had to be redrawn consistent with previous Supreme Court rulings. At the time the election districts were being drawn, the Republican Party controlled both houses of the Pennsylvania legislature as well as the Governor's office. According to the plaintiffs, prominent Republicans in the national party put pressure on the Assembly to redistrict along partisan lines "as a punitive measure against Democrats for having enacted pro-Democratic redistricting plans elsewhere" and to benefit the party in congressional elections in Pennsylvania.

== Legal arguments ==
The Court considered the following three major questions in relation to the appeal:

- Can voters affiliated with a political party sue to block implementation of a Congressional redistricting plan by claiming that it was manipulated for purely political reasons?
- Does a state violate the Equal Protection clause of the 14th Amendment when it disregards neutral redistricting principles (such as trying to avoid splitting municipalities into different Congressional districts) in order to achieve an advantage for one political party?
- Does a state exceed its power under Article I of the Constitution when it draws Congressional districts to ensure that a minority party will consistently win a super-majority of the state's Congressional seats?

=== Plaintiff's argument ===
Paul M. Smith represented the plaintiffs before the Supreme Court, arguing that "lower courts [have] effectively overruled [Davis v.] Bandemer". Smith contended that the District Court for the Middle District of Pennsylvania misapplied Bandemer by requiring evidence of voter suppression to the extent of proving complete disenfranchisement "or that your party has effectively been banned". He argued that if partisan gerrymandering was justiciable, as Bandemer held, a requirement to establish these independent constitutional violations would not make sense. The plaintiff's proposed standard, that one must be able to demonstrate with a congressional map that it would be impossible to get more than half the congressional seats with less than half the votes, came under heavy scrutiny for its supposed inapplicability.

The plaintiff also struggled to convince the Court that one could use prior voting records to decide the electoral outcome of a new redistricting scheme. Both Justice Scalia and Justice Breyer wondered how accurately this would be able to predict outcomes in future elections. Scalia stated the following:

Race does not change. You [..] are the race you are, and you're not going to change it next year. Political party doesn't work that way. How [...] do you decide what is the Republican vote? Is it just registered Republicans and is everybody that's registered a Republican now have to stay [...] I just don't understand how you run this scheme? You cannot really tell until after the election is done how many Republicans and how many Democrats there are in each district.

Smith justified this by emphasizing that future cases contending electoral maps would leave the burden of proof on the plaintiffs to prove that the districting scheme was unfair. The Court also questioned how districts could be redrawn to be fair even if a court were able to find a standard by which an electoral map could be struck down.

=== Defense's argument ===
John P. Krill, Jr. of K&L Gates represented Robert Jubelirer and John Perzel at the Supreme Court. The defense's argument rested on the claim that redistricting "requires inherent political choices to be made [which] are inappropriate for the judiciary to make" under the political question doctrine. This rather extreme position posited that even if the entire legislature came forward and admitted to political gerrymandering, it would not be the place of the judiciary to strike down the redistricting. The crux of this argument is that there is no constitutional requirement to draw districts impartially with regards to political party.

Furthermore, the defense took the ruling and successive elections regarding Indiana's contested electoral map in Bandemer to be instructive. Krill cites that Democrats, who were supposedly heavily gerrymandered against, won 50% of House seats from Indiana, and successively won control the following election. He also challenged the plaintiff's test used in the complaint as broken as it uses 10 years of election data, counting voters who could have died, moved, or otherwise not become involved in future elections. He also contends that the plaintiff's test assumes Democrats are evenly dispersed across the state when they are normally compacted into urban areas instead.

J. Bart DeLone from the Pennsylvania's Attorney General's Office represented Pedro Cortés and Monna Accurti (Commissioner of the Bureau of Commissions, Legislation and Elections) at the Supreme Court. He argued that even if the Court holds political gerrymandering justiciable, a districting scheme could only be found unconstitutional if "the disadvantaged group has been shut out of a political process as a whole." He also contends that Krill's claim that there is nothing wrong with judicial intent to gerrymander an electoral map is correct as districting is inherently political.

== Opinion of the Court ==
The plurality opinion determined that partisan gerrymandering claims were nonjusticiable because there was no discernible and manageable standard for "adjudicating political gerrymandering claims." The court did not explicitly overturn its ruling in Davis v. Bandemer.

Justice Anthony Kennedy concurred with the ruling of the court to uphold the District Court's decision maintaining that cases of political gerrymandering were not justiciable. He did not, however, foreclose the possibility that judicially manageable standards for gerrymandering could be developed in future cases before the Court.

Justice John Paul Stevens, Justice David Souter, and Justice Stephen Breyer each provided dissenting opinions.

== See also ==
- Davis v. Bandemer (1986)
- League of United Latin American Citizens v. Perry (2006)
- Gill v. Whitford (2018)
- Benisek v. Lamone and Rucho v. Common Cause (2019)
