= Linda Lamone =

American lawyer & elections administrator

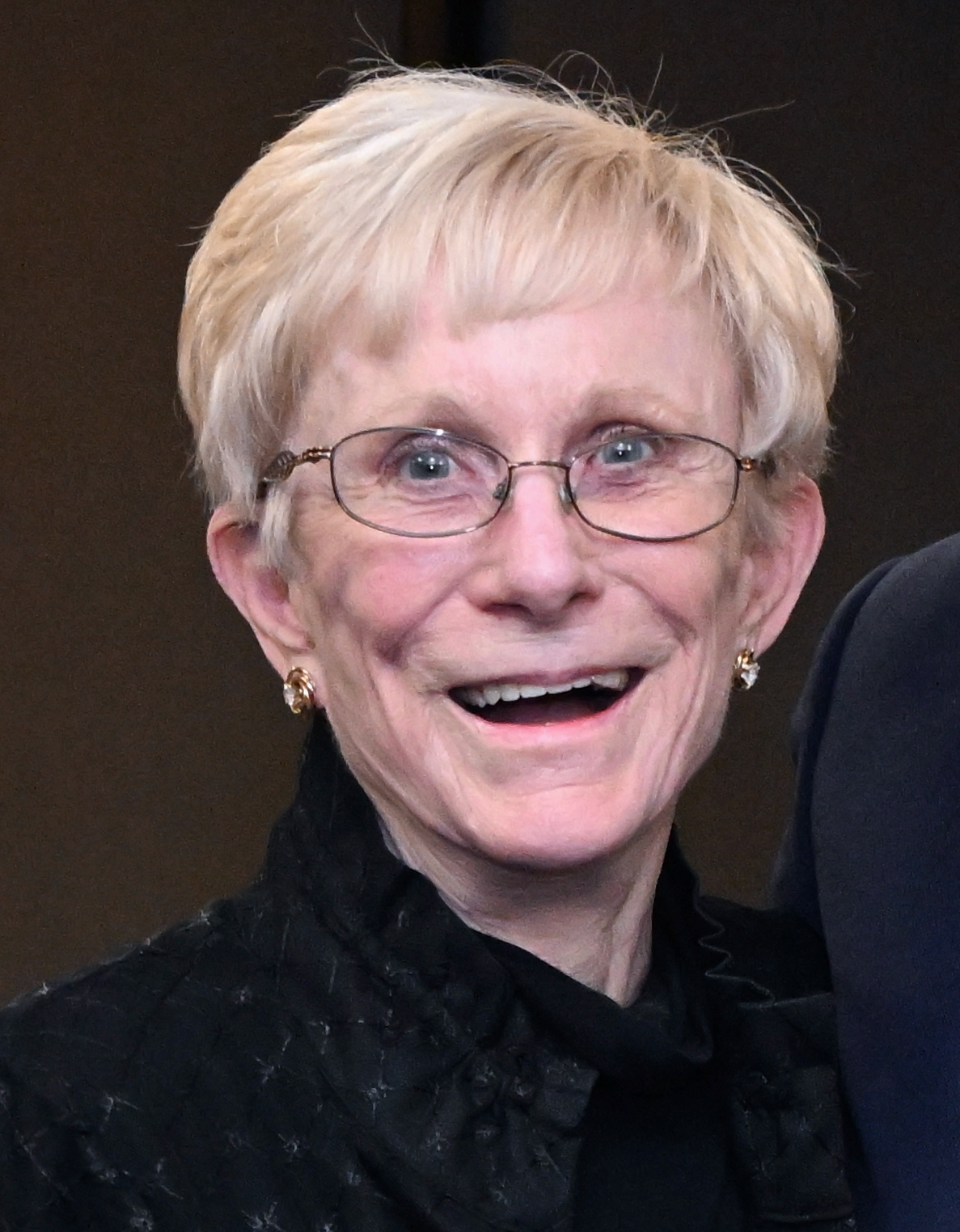
- Lamone in 2023
- Education: University of Maryland, College Park; University of Maryland, Baltimore
- Occupation: Lawyer
- Spouse: Rudolph Lamone (died 2023)

Linda H. Lamone is an American lawyer and election official who served as the Maryland State Administrator of Elections from 1997 to 2023. She was previously special counsel to lieutenant governor Melvin Steinberg.

== Education ==
Lamone earned a bachelor's degree with high honors from the University of Maryland, College Park. She completed a J.D. with honors from the University of Maryland Francis King Carey School of Law.

== Career ==
Lamone began her legal career in the office of the Attorney General of Maryland, where she held various positions, including serving in the office of counsel to the General Assembly. From 1983 to 1987, she was legal counsel to the State Administrative Board of Election Laws. She then served as special counsel to Maryland lieutenant governor Melvin Steinberg from 1987 to 1989.

After leaving government service, Lamone joined a lobbying firm, Rifkin, Evans, Silver & Lamone. The firm later dissolved, and she entered private legal practice on her own in 1990. During this time, she was part of the legal team representing governor Parris Glendening in the legal dispute over the 1994 Maryland gubernatorial election, in which Republican candidate Ellen Sauerbrey challenged the results based on allegations of election fraud.

In November 1995, Lamone became an assistant attorney general for the Maryland Higher Education Commission. She remained in that role until July 1, 1997, when governor Glendening appointed her as the administrator of the State Administrative Board of Election Laws, replacing Gene Raynor.

During her tenure, Lamone oversaw the modernization of Maryland's election system, including the computerization of campaign finance reports and implementation of electronic voting machines. In 2004, an effort to remove her from office by governor Bob Ehrlich was unsuccessful. That same year, the General Assembly passed legislation making it more difficult to remove the elections administrator, which became informally referred to as the "Linda Lamone for Life Act." She continued to serve as elections administrator through multiple election cycles, including those impacted by the COVID-19 pandemic in Maryland. Lamone announced her retirement in 2023, stating that she planned to step down sometime that summer.

== Personal life ==
Lamone was married to Rudolph Lamone, a professor at the University of Maryland, College Park, and former dean of the Robert H. Smith School of Business. He died in early 2023.

Lamone chaired the Maryland Attorney Grievance Commission.
