= Errol Vieth =

Errol Vieth (born 1950) is a senior lecturer at the School of Contemporary Communication, at Central Queensland University, Australia, a researcher, and an author.

Vieth's has Ph.D in Philosophy from the School of Film, Media and Cultural Studies at Griffith University, as well as a Master of Education from Deakin University.

His resume discusses expertise in history of science in film, public perception of science/scientists in media, motorcycling culture and Australian film.

== Bibliography ==
- Vieth, Errol; Moran, Albert (2006). Film in Australia: an introduction. Cambridge, UK: Cambridge University Press. ISBN 0-521-61327-2.
- Vieth, Errol; Moran Albert; Moran, Albert (2005). Historical dictionary of Australian and New Zealand cinema. Metuchen, N.J: Scarecrow. ISBN 0-8108-5459-7.
- Angels in the Media: Constructing outlaw motorcyclists. In Cryle, Denis and Hillier, Jean (Eds.)Consent and Consensus: Politics, Media and Governance in Twentieth Century Australia (2005), ISBN 1-920845-12-7
- Screening Science: Contexts, Texts, and Science in Fifties Science Fiction Film : Contexts, Texts, and Science in Fifties Science Fiction Film (2001), Scarecrow Press, ISBN 0-8108-4023-5
- Oliver, D., Luck, J. and Vieth, E. Chalk to Cable: Conquering the Tyranny of Distance in Australian Higher Education (1998) Proceedings of the Networked Lifelong Learning International Conference, April, University of Sheffield, Sheffield, pp 4.59–4.66.
- Writing and planning: the use of e-mail for distance education. (1995) In Creating Materials for Flexible Learning. Central Queensland University: Distance Education Centre. ISBN 1-875902-20-1
- Borland, Helen Elizabeth (1994). Communication & identity: local, regional, global: selected papers from the 1993 National Conference of the Australian Communication Association. Canberra: Australian and New Zealand Communication Association. ISBN 0-646-19132-2.
