= Gill v. Whitford =

- Supreme Court of the United States

Argued October 3, 2017 Decided June 18, 2018
- Full case name: Beverly R. Gill, et al. v. William Whitford, et al.
- Docket no.: 16-1161
- Citations: 585 U.S. 48 (more) 138 S. Ct. 1916; 201 L. Ed. 2d 313

Case history
- Prior: Whitford v. Gill, No. 3:15-cv-00421, 218 F. Supp. 3d 837 (W.D. Wis. 2016); stay granted, 137 S. Ct. 2289 (2017).

Holding
- Plaintiffs failed to demonstrate personal harm, on the basis argued, as a result of alleged partisan gerrymandering and therefore lacked standing. Remanded to District Court for further proceedings.

Court membership
- Chief Justice John Roberts Associate Justices Anthony Kennedy · Clarence Thomas; Ruth Bader Ginsburg · Stephen Breyer; Samuel Alito · Sonia Sotomayor; Elena Kagan · Neil Gorsuch

Case opinions
- Majority: Roberts, joined by Kennedy, Ginsburg, Breyer, Alito, Sotomayor, Kagan; Thomas, Gorsuch (except Part III)
- Concurrence: Kagan, joined by Ginsburg, Breyer, Sotomayor
- Concurrence: Thomas (in part), joined by Gorsuch

Gill v. Whitford, 585 U.S. 48 (2018), was a United States Supreme Court case involving the constitutionality of partisan gerrymandering. Other forms of gerrymandering based on racial or ethnic grounds had been deemed unconstitutional, and while the Supreme Court had identified that extreme partisan gerrymandering could also be unconstitutional, the Court had not agreed on how this could be defined, leaving the question to lower courts to decide. That issue was later resolved in Rucho v. Common Cause, in which the Court decided that partisan gerrymanders presented a nonjusticiable political question.

Gill arose following the 2011 redistricting plan for the State of Wisconsin created by Republican legislators to maximize the likelihood that the Republicans would be able to secure additional seats in the State legislature over the next few election cycles. The plan was challenged by Democratic citizens, claiming the redistricting plan caused their votes to be "wasted". The case was filed in 2015, and by 2016, the District Court for the Western District of Wisconsin ruled in favor of the Democrats, based on the evaluation of the efficiency gap measure developed for this case, and ordered Wisconsin to redo its districts by 2017. The State appealed the ruling to the Supreme Court, which heard the case in October 2017.

During the Court's deliberations, it also accepted to hear the merits of another partisan gerrymandering case, Benisek v. Lamone, related to the 2011 redistricting of Maryland's 6th congressional district, for which it heard oral arguments in March 2018. While the majority of political scientists agree that Wisconsin's map was heavily biased, it was expected that the case would center on whether the efficiency gap measures and other metrics provided by political scientists meet the criteria that Justice Anthony Kennedy set forth in his concurring opinion in Vieth v. Jubelirer (2004), a previous Supreme Court case dealing with partisan gerrymandering.

Ruling on June 18, 2018, the Court remanded the case to lower courts, finding that the plaintiffs had not demonstrated standing for the case in demonstration of harm, though the Justices were split on to what degree the plaintiffs must show "concrete and particularized injuries".

== Background ==
In the United States, each state has a number of members of the House of Representatives proportional to the state's population determined by the US Census conducted every ten years under Article One of the United States Constitution, with each state having at least one Representative regardless of its population size. A state that has more than one representative must redistrict after the new census to ensure that each district continues to have an equal number of people. Once set, a voter residing in a specific district may only vote in the Representative election for that district. Many states further use Census data to determine the internal state districts that are used to determine representation in the state government.

The process of redistricting has become highly politicized since redistricting is typically done by the political party that holds the majority of state elected officials. Notably, the practice of gerrymandering, redistricting that draws convoluted district boundaries to favor or disadvantage certain socioeconomic groups, has frequently been used to improve the party's chances of securing elections in the future. Although the US Supreme Court has ruled that redistricting that discriminates on racial or ethnic grounds is unconstitutional, it had been reluctant to issue a similarly-strong ruling for partisan redistricting. The Court has ruled that excessive partisan gerrymandering violates the Constitution. However, the ruling has yet to adopt a standard for determining partisan gerrymandering in redistricting, with proposed tests being too ambiguous for the courts to apply. In the decision for the 2004 case Vieth v. Jubelirer, which ruled that perceived partisan gerrymandering in Pennsylvania was not unconstitutional, the nine Justices were split. The four Justices in the plurality believed that it was impossible to define a standard to judge partisan gerrymandering, and four others could not agree on an existing standard to be used. Justice Anthony Kennedy, in his concurrence with the plurality, believed that some manageable standard for determining partisan gerrymandering could be developed and challenged lower courts to help identify this standard.

=== Wisconsin redistricting ===
In 2011, Republican legislators in Wisconsin redrew the state Assembly districts based on the latest 2010 census data. This effort was driven by the Republican Party's REDMAP (Redistricting Majority Project) to assure the party had control of the United States House of Representatives and state legislatures, principally through favorable redistricting. The 2011 mapmakers developed a model for evaluating voters' party preferences in aggregate, and drew up spreadsheets identifying likely winners in various proposed districts, labelling these districts as "assertive" or "aggressive" to indicate how likely each was to elect a Republican. They also collaborated with a political science professor, who determined "that Republicans would maintain a majority under any likely voting scenario." Under the "final map," mapmakers determined that "Republicans could expect to win 59 Assembly seats, with 38 safe Republican seats, 14 leaning Republican, 10 swing, 4 leaning Democratic, and 33 safe Democratic seats." The new redistricting map was approved by the State as Act 43, in August 2011. Reflecting this, in the 2012 elections, the Republicans gained 60.6% of the seats in the State Assembly, despite receiving only 48.6% of the statewide vote.

=== District Court ===
On July 8, 2015, the case was filed with the U.S. District Court for the Western District of Wisconsin arguing that Wisconsin's 2011 state assembly map was unconstitutional partisan gerrymandering favoring the Republican-controlled legislature which discriminated against Democratic voters. The case was filed by the Campaign Legal Center (CLC), representing twelve plaintiffs that were registered Democrats. The lead plaintiff, Professor William Whitford, from University of Wisconsin, stated, "In a democracy citizens are supposed to choose their legislators. In Wisconsin, legislators have chosen their voters." The plaintiffs argued that the map violates the Fourteenth Amendment's guarantee of equal protection. Whitford's complaint specifically claimed that the redrawn maps purposely diluted Democratic voters so that they would be wasted votes (that is, "cracking" the votes) while organizing a small number of districts to pack in a large number of Democratic voters to limit the number of seats the party would win ("packing" the votes). The District Court case was originally filed as Whitford v. Nichol, as Gerald Nicole had been the chairman of the state elections board; he was succeeded by Beverly Gill during the course of the case.

Chart of the 2014 Wisconsin State Assembly

In 2016, a three-judge federal panel allowed the case to proceed to trial, the first time a case regarding gerrymandering has proceeded in three decades. On November 21, 2016, a 2–1 decision declared that the map was unconstitutional. To assess the validity of the map, the panel developed a three-pronged test that asked if the redistricting "(1) [was] intended to place a severe impediment on the effectiveness of the votes of individual citizens on the basis of their political affiliation, (2) has that effect, and (3) cannot be justified on other, legitimate legislative grounds." The panel judged these prongs based on whether they created an entrenchment of power, specifically defined as "making that party—and therefore the state government—impervious to the interests of citizens affiliated with other political parties", which has been the basis for unconstitutional gerrymandering in the past. In the panel, Judge Kenneth Francis Ripple's opinion, joined by Judge Barbara Brandriff Crabb, was that the map worked better than its drafters had hoped. "It secured for Republicans a lasting Assembly majority. It did so by allocating votes among the newly created districts in such a way that, in any likely electoral scenario, the number of Republican seats would not drop below 50%."

The panel also used the Efficiency Gap measure, developed in 2014 by law professor and lead attorney for the plaintiffs Nicholas Stephanopoulos, and political scientist Eric McGhee. The Efficiency Gap relates the number of wasted votes for each party across the state, with a gaps of 0% equating to a fair distribution. By definition, an Efficiency Gap of more than 7% would have allowed the Republicans to retain their advantage throughout the life of the Act 43 map. The panel determined that the Efficiency Gap was 13% and 10% for the 2012 and 2014 elections, respectively, exceeding the 7% criteria.

Judge William C. Griesbach dissented, believing that there were more appropriate measures they could take to prevent partisan gerrymandering, such as requiring a non-partisan redistricting panel. Griesbach also believed that the entrenchment principle would not be accepted by the Supreme Court over more traditional methods of measuring deviation, and that the use of the relatively new Efficiency Gap measure mischaracterizes the nature of a wasted vote.

The District Court's decision was seen as potentially satisfying the requirements for a test requested by the Supreme Court in Vieth; the three-prong test provided by the Court was able to distinguish between inherent and invidious gerrymandering through the narrowly defined anti-entrenchment principle through the lifetime of the districting map. It also introduced reproducible measurements through the Efficiency Gap that allow biases in redistricting schemes to be quantified.

The panel deferred its ruling on the remedy which was handed down on January 27, 2017. The District Court ordered the State of Wisconsin to redraw their districts by November 1, 2017, as remedy for the case, using proposals brought by the plaintiffs to guide their decisions.

== Supreme Court ==
=== Appeal ===
The State announced its intentions to appeal to the Supreme Court of the United States following the District Court's ruling in November 2016. Due to special procedures in the Supreme Court involving voters' rights cases, the Supreme Court was required to take the case, though whether they would summarily rule to affirm or reverse, or hear the case in full, would be up to the discretion of the Court. The State asked that the action in the District Court be put on hold until the appeal is decided. The State requested that the Supreme Court overturn the trial court's decision and allow the Legislature to continue drawing its assembly maps. The State was joined through amicus curiae briefs filed by twelve other states led by Texas. Separately, the CLC and its co-counsel from the District Court filed a motion to affirm the District Court's ruling on May 8, 2017.

In June 2017, the Supreme Court agreed to hear the state's challenge to the District Court's decision in the case Gill v. Whitford, granting the request to put the remapping action on hold. It was the first time that the Supreme Court has evaluated partisan redistricting based on the First Amendment's freedom of association clause in addition to the Equal Protection Clause. The case received at least 54 amicus curiae briefs across numerous fields. Among these were several by political scholars that had the consensus that "by any measure, Wisconsin's 2010 redistricting plan is extremely biased". These scholars introduced other metrics besides the efficiency gaps that equally demonstrated the partisan bias in Wisconsin's plan, which were expected to be considered to be evaluated by the Justices.

Oral arguments were heard on October 3, 2017, as the first before the Court in its new term. Oral arguments were given by Paul Smith of the CLC, representing the original plaintiffs, and by Misha Tseytlin, the Wisconsin Solicitor General. Erin E. Murphy participated in oral argument as an amicus on behalf of Wisconsin's State Senate. Smith argued that while the Court's previous attempts to regulate partisan gerrymandering failed due to lack of a usable measure, modern statistics and advanced computing available today made it very easy for the Wisconsin Republicans to create their favorable redistricting plan, but these tools would be just as useful to determine when partisan gerrymandering had occurred. Smith also reiterated that the Supreme Court was "the only institution in the United States ... that can solve this problem". Tseytlin warned the Court that should they find against the State, that redistricting would become heavily influenced by social science metrics, and that it would "shift districting from elected public officials to the courts".

Court observers identified that the Justices were split from the oral session. The four Justices that were considered liberal appeared to side with the original plaintiffs in arguing that the redistricting plan was biased, with Justice Ruth Bader Ginsburg proposing that if they did not intervene here, Republicans would likely be able to stack other states in a similar manner, and it would de-incentive voters not favored by such redistricting plans to vote. Four of the conservative Justices felt the Court should not intervene, with Chief Justice John Roberts fearing that if they get involved, it would open up for more redistricting challenges that the Supreme Court would need to take up, and could harm the Court's credibility. The conservative Justices also questioned if the defendants had legal standing to bring the case forward in the first place.

The decision was expected to hinge on Justice Kennedy, who had held a middle ground in Vieth and wrote in his opinion about the need to find a "manageable standard" to determine if a partisan gerrymandering had occurred. Commentators observed that the stay of the District Court order was split 5–4, with Kennedy supporting the majority. During the oral arguments, Kennedy had appeared to side with the conservatives on asking about the legitimacy of the original plaintiffs in bringing the case, but asked both sides difficult questions relating to the redistricting approaches, leaving it difficult for observers to tell which way he would decide. However, some writers expected that he would side with the lower court and not for the appellants.

Subsequent to the oral arguments, the Court had agreed to hear one other partisan redistricting case in the same term: Benisek v. Lamone, accepted in December 2017 and heard by the Court in March 2018, which was based on Democratic-favored redistricting of Maryland's 6th congressional district.

=== Opinion of the Court ===
Oral arguments
Recording of oral arguments before the Supreme Court.

This court ruled on the plaintiffs lacked standing in the evidence they brought to the court, and remanded the case so that they could present evidence in favor of their standing. Chief Justice John Roberts wrote the unanimous decision to remand the case, arguing that the plaintiffs in the Wisconsin cases could not argue that there was harm to them due to the redistricting as presented in the current case, pointing out that Whitford, a Democrat, lived in a heavily-Democratic district. Instead, Roberts suggested there may be other forms of harm that the plaintiffs could demonstrate, such as by considering the impact of the redistricting on the entire state rather than one district.

=== Concurrences ===
Justice Elena Kagan wrote a concurring opinion, joined by Ruth Bader Ginsburg, Stephen Breyer, and Sonia Sotomayor, which identified steps that the plaintiffs could use in the remanded case to demonstrate harm. Justice Clarence Thomas wrote another concurrence in part joined by Neil Gorsuch, supporting the majority opinion but believing the Court should have vacated the case because he believed the plaintiffs had no standing. The District Court re-hearing was scheduled to start in April 2019.

The Gill decision was issued on the same day as Benisek, in which a per curiam decision did not rule on the gerrymandering issues but instead on a procedural aspect of the case. Many observers felt the Court had punted the issue of partisan gerrymandering, and may wait to decide on the issue in North Carolina v. Covington, a pending petition before the Supreme Court that the Court has already been involved with in January 2018 by blocking an injunction issued by the Appeals Court.

== Subsequent developments ==
Political scientists had warned that a decision upholding the decision of the Wisconsin government would likely lead to democratic backsliding in the United States, as it may have led to the further use of gerrymandering and subsequently vast swathes of uncompetitive districts. These political scientists stated that if the case was upheld, it had the potential to establish political polarization, as incumbents' main threats would be extremist challengers in political primaries.

The 2018 general elections in Wisconsin, following the Supreme Court's decision in Gill which retained the existing districting maps pending hearing of the lower court, further demonstrated significant imbalance in voting profiles. For the State Assembly, 54% of the popular vote supported Democratic candidates, but the Republicans ended up maintaining their 63-seat majority. The efficiency gap, estimated to be 10% in 2014, increased to 15% based on election results.

On December 22, 2023, the Wisconsin Supreme Court issued its opinion in Clarke v. Wisconsin Elections Commission. Writing for an ideologically-divided 4-3 majority, Justice Jill Karofsky determined that the maps violated the Constitution of Wisconsin and enjoined the Wisconsin Elections Commission from using them for the 2024 Wisconsin elections. The Court ordered the Wisconsin Legislature to draw new maps.

== See also ==
- Baker v. Carr (1962)
- Davis v. Bandemer (1986)
- League of United Latin American Citizens v. Perry (2006)
- Rucho v. Common Cause (2019)
- Clarke v. Wisconsin Elections Commission (2023)
