= List of United States Supreme Court cases, volume 585 =

This is a list of all the United States Supreme Court cases from volume 585 of the United States Reports:

Case name	Docket no.	Date decided
Minnesota Voters Alliance v. Mansky	585 U.S. 1	June 14, 2018
Minnesota's ban on political apparel at polling places violates the First Amendment's free speech clause.
Animal Science Products, Inc. v. Hebei Welcome Pharmaceutical Co.	585 U.S. 33	June 14, 2018
A federal court must provide respectful consideration to a foreign government's representation of its own law, but not conclusive effect.
Gill v. Whitford	585 U.S. 48	June 18, 2018
Plaintiffs failed to demonstrate personal harm, on the basis argued, as a result of alleged partisan gerrymandering and therefore lacked standing. Remanded to District Court for further proceedings.
Lozman v. City of Riviera Beach	585 U.S. 87	June 18, 2018
Existence of probable cause to arrest the plaintiff in the present case does not bar the plaintiff's First Amendment retaliation claim.
Chavez-Meza v. United States	585 U.S. 109	June 18, 2018
When the record as a whole demonstrates the judge had a reasoned basis for his decision, the judge's use of generic boilerplate to explain their choice of a sentence reduction under the Guidelines is adequate.
Rosales-Mireles v. United States	585 U.S. 129	June 18, 2018
A miscalculation of a Guidelines sentencing range that has been determined to be plain and to affect a defendant's substantial rights calls for a court of appeals to exercise its discretion to vacate the defendant's sentence in the ordinary case.
Benisek v. Lamone	585 U.S. 155	June 18, 2018
The District Court's denial of injunctive relief against the use of Maryland's 2011 redistricting maps was not an abuse of discretion.
South Dakota v. Wayfair, Inc.	585 U.S. 162	June 21, 2018
The physical presence rule is rejected as unsound and incorrect. States may charge sales tax on out-of-state purchases even if the seller does not have a physical presence in the taxing state.
Pereira v. Sessions	585 U.S. 198	June 21, 2018
A Notice to Appear that does not inform a noncitizen when and where to appear for a removal proceeding is not valid under 8 U.S. Code § 1229(b) and therefore does not trigger the stop-time rule which is used to calculate the ten year continuous presence requirement for non-lawful permanent residents.
Lucia v. SEC	585 U.S. 237	June 21, 2018
Administrative law judges of the Securities and Exchange Commission are considered officers of the United States and so are subject to the Appointments Clause.
Wisconsin Central Ltd. v. United States	585 U.S. 274	June 21, 2018
Employee stock options are not taxable "compensation" under the Railroad Retirement Tax Act because they are not "money remuneration".
Carpenter v. United States	585 U.S. 296	June 22, 2018
Whether the warrantless seizure and search of historical cell phone records revealing the location and movements of a cell phone user over the course of 127 days is permitted by the Fourth Amendment.
WesternGeco LLC v. ION Geophysical Corp.	585 U.S. 407	June 22, 2018
Awarding lost profits over patent-infringing goods assembled outside of the United States with components manufactured in the United States was a permissible domestic application of Section 284 of the Patent Act.
Ortiz v. United States	585 U.S. 427	June 22, 2018
1. The Appointments Clause does not impose rules about an officer of the United States serving in dual roles. Rather, the clause is concerned only with the method of appointment of the officer.; 2. Military judge's simultaneous service on an Air Force Court of Criminal Appeals and the Court of Military Commission Review violated neither 10 U. S. C. §973(b)(2)(A) nor the appointments clause of the Constitution.
Currier v. Virginia	585 U.S. 493	June 22, 2018
If a criminal defendant consents to sever their case into multiple trials, they waive issue preclusion in the subsequent trials.
Dalmazzi v. United States	585 U.S. 527	June 22, 2018
Dismissed as improvidently granted.
Cox v. United States	585 U.S. 528	June 22, 2018
Dismissed as improvidently granted.
Ohio v. American Express Company	585 U.S. 529	June 25, 2018
American Express's steering provisions do not violate federal antitrust law.
Abbott v. Perez	585 U.S. 579	June 25, 2018
The Texas court erred in requiring the State to show that the 2013 Legislature purged the "taint" that the court attributed to the defunct and never-used plans enacted by a prior legislature in 2011.
Trump v. Hawaii	585 U.S. 667	June 26, 2018
Presidential Proclamation 9645 did not violate the INA or the Establishment Clause by suspending the entry of aliens from several nations. Substantial deference must be accorded to the Executive in the conduct of foreign affairs and the exclusion of aliens.
National Institute of Family and Life Advocates v. Becerra	585 U.S. 755	June 26, 2018
The California Reproductive FACT Act, which required crisis pregnancy centers to alert clients about state-assisted abortions, violated the First Amendment to the United States Constitution.
Florida v. Georgia	585 U.S. 803	June 27, 2018
Florida made a legally sufficient showing as to the possibility of fashioning an effective remedial decree equitably apportioning the water of the ACF basin.
Janus v. State, County, and Municipal Employees	585 U.S. 878	June 27, 2018
1. The District Court had jurisdiction over petitioner’s suit.; 2. The State’s extraction of agency fees from nonconsenting public-sector employees violates the First Amendment. Abood erred in concluding otherwise, and stare decisis cannot support it. Abood is therefore overruled.; 3. For these reasons, States and public-sector unions may no longer extract agency fees from nonconsenting employees.
Sause v. Bauer	585 U.S. 957	June 28, 2018
Neither the free exercise issue nor the offcers' entitlement to qualifed immunity can be resolved against Sause, a pro se complainant, consistent with the requirement to liberally construe allegations in a pro se complaint.
Sexton v. Beaudreaux	585 U.S. 961	June 28, 2018
Supreme Court precedents from cases applying 28 U. S. C. § 2254(d), such as Harrington v. Richter, require that, when there is no reasoned state-court decision on the merits, the federal court must determine what arguments or theories... could have supported the state court's decision; and then it must ask whether it is possible fair-minded jurists could disagree that those arguments or theories are inconsistent with the holding in a prior decision of this Court. If such disagreement is possible, then the petitioner's claim must be denied.
North Carolina v. Covington	585 U.S. 969	June 28, 2018
The District Court's remedial authority was limited to ensuring that the plaintiffs were relieved of the burden of voting in racially gerrymandered legislative districts. Once the court ensured that the racial gerrymanders at issue were remedied, its proper role in the legislative districting process was at an end.
