= Efficiency gap =

Measure of the fairness of electoral districts

The efficiency gap is a measure to determine the fairness of electoral districts for first-past-the-post voting with a two-party system. It measures which political party had the most wasted votes (and by how much). It has notably been used to inform debates around gerrymandering in the United States.

== Equation ==
The efficiency gap is defined as the difference between the two major U.S. political parties' wasted votes (votes which did not receive representation as a result of the election), divided by the total number of votes.

== History ==
The efficiency gap was first devised by University of Chicago law professor Nicholas Stephanopoulos and political scientist Eric McGhee in 2014. The metric has notably been used to quantitatively assess the effect of gerrymandering, the assigning of voters to electoral districts in such a way as to increase the number of districts won by one political party at the expense of another.

== Gerrymandering ==
Stephanopoulos and McGhee argued that in a non-partisan redistricting with two roughly equally popular parties, assuming U.S.-style first-past-the-post elections, the efficiency gap would be close to zero, with a similar number of wasted votes from either party. They advocated defining illegal gerrymandering as when the efficiency gap goes above 7% or below -7%. If the gap exceeded 7%, then Stephanopoulos and McGhee argued that this could allow the party with fewer wasted votes to control the state for the duration of the validity of the map.

Mira Bernstein and Moon Duchin argue that the efficiency gap is a useful starting point and should be built upon with additional measures, like the compactness measure of a shape to prevent against gerrymandering.

== Examples ==
Citing in part an efficiency gap of 11.69% to 13% in favor of the Republicans, in 2016 a U.S. District Court ruled in Gill v. Whitford against the 2011 drawing of Wisconsin legislative districts. It was the first U.S. Federal court ruling to strike down a redistricting on the grounds of favoring a political party. In the 2012 election for the state legislature, Republican candidates had 48.6% of the two-party votes but won 61% of the 99 districts. The court found that the disparate treatment of Democratic and Republican voters violated the 1st and 14th amendments to the US Constitution. The State appealed the district court's Gill v. Whitford ruling to the Supreme Court, which said that the plaintiffs did not have standing and sent the case back to the district court. Consequently, existing gerrymandered district maps were used in the 2018 elections. For the State Assembly, 54% of the popular vote supported Democratic candidates, but the Republicans retained their 63-seat majority. The efficiency gap, estimated to be 10% in 2014, increased to 15% based on 2018 election results. The efficiency gap can be represented as a seat advantage, for example in 2017 the two US states with highest efficiency seat advantage of 3 seats were North Carolina and Pennsylvania, Rhode Island had one of the highest positive efficiency gaps, while Florida has one of the highest negative efficiency gaps.

== Sample calculation ==
The following example illustrates the efficiency gap calculation. There are two parties, A and B. According to the original paper, wasted votes for the winner (say A) are those "beyond the 50 per-cent threshold needed" i.e., beyond 50% plus one or A-((A+B)/2+1) or more simply (A-B)/2-1, if A-B is even, like here, otherwise use int((A-B)/2). There are 500 voters divided into 5 districts with 100 voters each. In the recent election, Party A had about 45% of the votes but won 4 of the 5 districts, as follows:

District	A votes	B votes	Winner	A Wasted Votes	B Wasted Votes
1	53	47	A	2	47
2	53	47	A	2	47
3	53	47	A	2	47
4	53	47	A	2	47
5	15	85	B	15	34
total	227	273	4-A, 1-B	23	222

The efficiency gap is the difference in the two party's wasted votes, divided by the total number of votes.

- All votes for a losing candidate are wasted .
- To win a district, 51 votes are needed, so the excess votes for the winner are wasted votes.

Efficiency gap = $\frac{222-23}{500} = 39.8\%$ in favor of Party A.

Party A has less than half the votes, but far more of Party B's votes are wasted.

== Suggested improvements ==
Mira Bernstein raised suggestions for improvement for the current efficiency gap (EG) equation. Most notably, it largely reduces to a simple measure of the relationship between the statewide vote lean minus half the seat lean. A state with 60% of its residents belonging to a single party and an election that awarded 60% of the seats to that party—in other words, a perfectly proportional outcome—would therefore be labeled as problematic vote, because its Efficiency Gap would be $20\% - 10\% = 10\%$, higher than the 7% often cited as a threshold for evidence of gerrymandering. This shows EG, powerful as it can be, is insufficient by itself, for guaranteeing lack of gerrymandering. It might require additional measures, like compactness measure of a shape as evinced in examples from the paper, which concludes

The Wisconsin plaintiffs are not asking the court to enshrine EG as the one true measure of partisan gerrymandering, but only to accept it as a starting point in building a test to show when entrenched partisan advantage has risen to the level of vote dilution of political opponents. We hope that the Supreme Court agrees with them in a decision that leaves room for EG to pave the way for refined metrics and methods in the years to come.

Normalizing EG to a particular proportional split in the population will correct this. One possible Corrected EG (CEG) is (1±EG)/(1+IEG) - 1, where IEG is EG for the ideally proportioned case, as above. The sign used with EG depends on whether the wasted votes favor the majority party(+) or not(-). CEG = 0% for the ideally proportioned case, and CEG = 0.9/1.1 - 1 = -18.18% for the reverse case of the above, 10% EG against the majority party. One could reject a hypothesis of no gerrymander if |CEG| > something like 7% often cited as a threshold for evidence of gerrymandering.

North Carolina is a gerrymandered state where Republicans won 53% of the statewide vote in 2016 but elected only 3 Democrat vs 10 Republican Congressmen. Assuming the same 60/40 voter affiliation split above for Dem/Rep (57/43 is closer for 2016 and 2018) The NC CEG for 2016 is (1-0.1928)/1.1 - 1 = -26.62%, and for 2018 is (1-0.2746)/1.1 - 1 = -34.05%. CEGs here are negative for the majority party wasted vote disadvantage.

== See also ==
- Duverger's law – Winner-takes-all voting systems tend to result in only two viable parties
- Gerrymandering
- Proportional representation

== Sources ==
- Amy, Douglas J. (2000). Behind the Ballot Box: A Citizen's Guide to Voting Systems. Praeger/Greenwood. ISBN 0-275-96585-6.
