= Rucho v. Common Cause =

- Supreme Court of the United States

Argued March 26, 2019 Decided June 27, 2019
- Full case name: Robert A. Rucho et al. v. Common Cause et al.
- Docket no.: 18-422
- Citations: 588 U.S. 684 (more) 139 S. Ct. 2484; 204 L. Ed. 2d 931

Case history
- Prior: Motion to dismiss denied, Common Cause v. Rucho, 240 F. Supp. 3d 376 (M.D.N.C. 2017); redistricting plan held unconstitutional, 279 F. Supp. 3d 587 (M.D.N.C. 2018); stay denied, 284 F. Supp. 3d 780 (M.D.N.C. 2018); vacated and remanded in light of Gill v. Whitford, 138 S. Ct. 2679 (2018); judgment entered on remand, 318 F. Supp. 3d 777 (M.D.N.C. 2018).

Holding
- Partisan gerrymandering claims present political questions beyond the reach of the federal courts.

Court membership
- Chief Justice John Roberts Associate Justices Clarence Thomas · Ruth Bader Ginsburg; Stephen Breyer · Samuel Alito; Sonia Sotomayor · Elena Kagan; Neil Gorsuch · Brett Kavanaugh

Case opinions
- Majority: Roberts, joined by Thomas, Alito, Gorsuch, Kavanaugh
- Dissent: Kagan, joined by Ginsburg, Breyer, Sotomayor

Rucho v. Common Cause, 588 U.S. 684 (2019), is a landmark case of the United States Supreme Court concerning partisan gerrymandering. The Court ruled that while partisan gerrymandering may be "incompatible with democratic principles", the federal courts cannot review such allegations, as they present nonjusticiable political questions outside the jurisdiction of these courts.

The case was one of three heard in the 2018 term dealing with issues related to partisan gerrymandering used in the districting plans of states. It was combined with Rucho v. League of Women Voters of North Carolina, and its decision included the Court's judgment on Lamone v. Benisek, a partisan gerrymandering case from Maryland. The 5–4 decision, divided along ideological lines, left in place North Carolina's congressional districts, which favored the Republican Party, and Maryland's congressional districts, which favored the Democratic Party.

== Background ==
Historically, North Carolina is seen to have a near-equal split of voters between the Republican and Democratic parties, and the political parties, backed by wealthy donors on both sides, have fought over control of the state using gerrymandering for decades. Prior to 2011, seven of the state's thirteen districts favored Democrats, the rest Republican.

The first redistricting map for North Carolina following the 2010 census was released in 2011, which resulted in nine districts favoring Republicans. A legal challenge over the new congressional redistricting map shortly followed, claiming that the map utilized racial gerrymandering which was unconstitutional under the Voting Rights Act of 1965. In 2016, the case's hearing in the Middle District of North Carolina ruled the map was unconstitutional and gave the state's General Assembly two weeks to revise the map, to be approved by the District Court. The ruling was challenged, and ultimately reached the Supreme Court as Cooper v. Harris. The Supreme Court affirmed the District Court's ruling in 2017.

While the case was challenged at the Supreme Court, the previous chairmen of the state's redistricting committee, State Senator Bob Rucho and Representative David R. Lewis, brought in an expert to help with a new map, while a new redistricting committee was formed by the Republican-favored General Assembly, which voted on seven principles for this new map. Among them, the new map would not be developed using any data on racial makeup, but that it would use political makeup to strive to keep the same proportion of voters in each district. Lewis was quoted as saying "I propose that we draw the maps to give a partisan advantage to 10 Republicans and three Democrats, because I do not believe it’s possible to draw a map with 11 Republicans and two Democrats." The District Court approved the 2016 map, which had been used in the 2016 elections and was set to be used in the 2018 general elections as well.

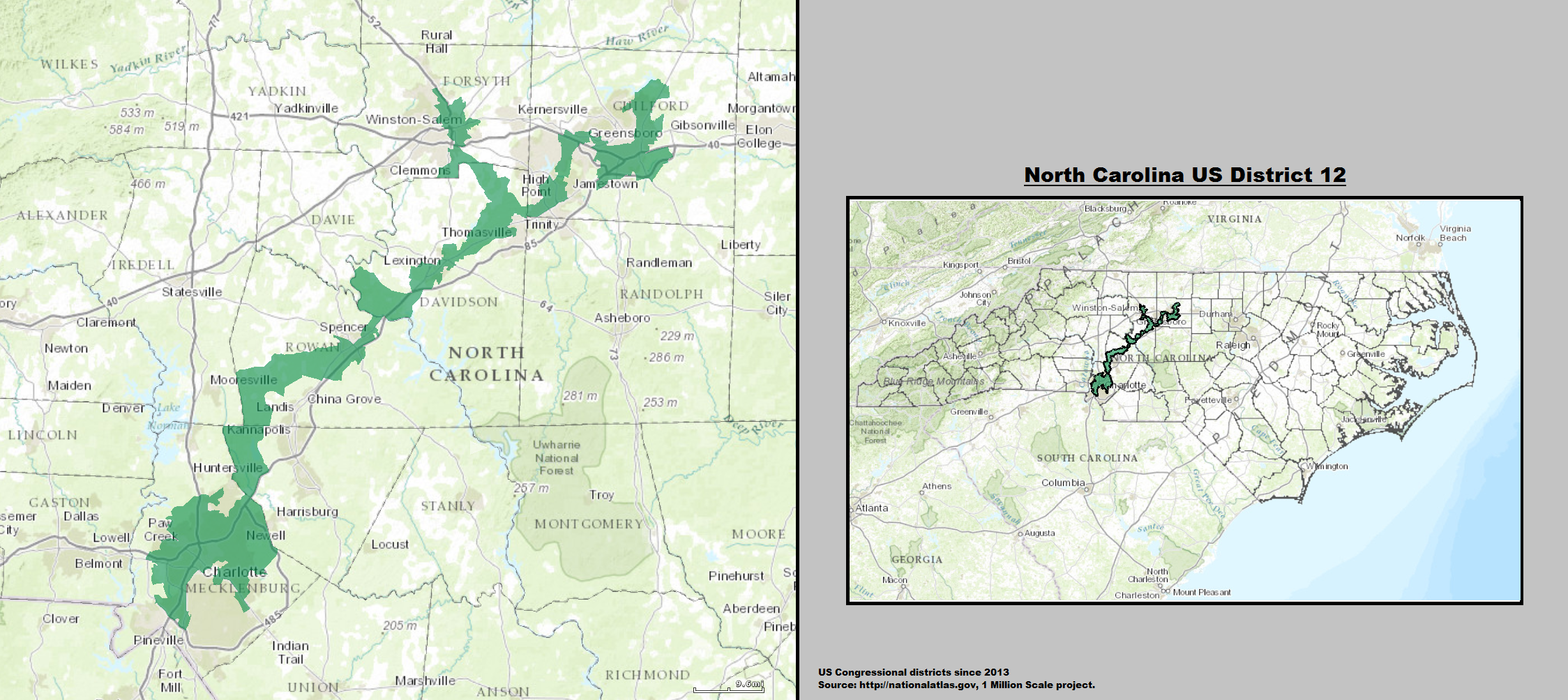
The 12th congressional district of North Carolina, as defined from 2013 to 2017

The new 2016 maps were subject to immediate challenge by Common Cause, the North Carolina Democratic Party, the League of Women Voters, and several individuals in separate lawsuits against Rucho, Lewis, and other state legislators, not only that the redistricting violated the Equal Protection Clause and the First Amendment but also violated two principles of Article I of the United States Constitution. Of particular concern were North Carolina's 1st and 12th congressional district, which had been previously identified as gerrymandered districts in the 2011 maps, and were identified to be disproportionately Democratic with the 2016 maps. The cases were consolidated at the U.S. District Court for the Middle District of North Carolina.

At this time, the Supreme Court was hearing the challenge of Gill v. Whitford, a partisan gerrymandering case out of Wisconsin. In North Carolina, the defendants sought a stay of the trial pending the result of Gill, but were denied. The case proceeded with the District Court finding in early 2018 in favor of the plaintiffs that the 2016 North Carolina map was unconstitutional towards all four points made by the plaintiffs. Again, the District Court ordered the legislature to draw up a new map within 14 days and enjoined the state from using the 2016 map. The defendant sought an emergency stay of the District Court's order from the Supreme Court, given the nearness of the 2018 general elections. The Supreme Court agreed, staying the District Court's order until after a decision on Gill had been made.

The Supreme Court decided Gill in June 2018, which ruled that the petitioners challenging the redistricting map in Gill did not have standing to challenge the map, and thus did not reach the merits of the partisan gerrymandering allegations. The Supreme Court subsequently vacated the North Carolina District Court's ruling and directed that it review the case in light of their decision on Gill. By August 2018, the District Court issued its new decision, affirming that the plaintiffs had standing, and affirming their previous decision on the 2016 maps being unconstitutional. While the option of enjoining the use of the 2016 maps was offered, plaintiffs agreed that the 2018 general election was too close, and the Court allowed the 2016 maps to be used until after the 2018 elections, while requiring the state legislature to draw up new maps.

Separately, Common Cause and state Democrats challenged the legislative redistricting maps drawn up alongside the congressional district maps within the North Carolina state courts.

== Supreme Court ==
The state legislators named as defendants in this case filed a petition for writ of certiorari with the Supreme Court, asking if the plaintiffs have standing and if their claims on partisan gerrymandering were justiciable, and whether the 2016 map is considered a partisan gerrymandering. The Court granted certiorari, with arguments heard on March 26, 2019. The oral arguments were heard alongside those of Lamone v. Benisek, another partisan gerrymandering case from Maryland's redistricting which followed the Court's per curiam decision in Benisek v. Lamone (2018).

The Court issued its decision in Rucho and Lamone on June 27, 2019. In the 5–4 majority opinion, the Court ruled that "partisan gerrymandering claims present political questions beyond the reach of the federal courts", vacating and remanding the lower courts' decisions with instructions to dismiss for lack of jurisdiction. Chief Justice John Roberts delivered the majority opinion, joined by Justices Thomas, Alito, Gorsuch, and Kavanaugh. Roberts made clear that partisan gerrymandering can be distasteful and unjust, but that states and Congress have the ability to enact laws to curb excessive partisan gerrymandering.

Justice Elena Kagan wrote the dissenting opinion, joined by Justices Ginsburg, Breyer, and Sotomayor. Kagan's opinion was critical of the majority: "Of all times to abandon the Court's duty to declare the law, this was not the one. The practices challenged in these cases imperil our system of government. Part of the Court's role in that system is to defend its foundations. None is more important than free and fair elections. With respect but deep sadness, I dissent."
