= North Carolina's congressional districts =

U.S. House districts in the state of North Carolina

District lines to be used from the 2026 elections, per SB 249 passed by the North Carolina General Assembly on October 22, 2025 Interactive map version

District lines used for the 2024 elections Interactive map version

North Carolina is currently divided into 14 congressional districts, each represented by a member of the United States House of Representatives. After the 2000 census, the number of North Carolina's seats was increased from 12 to 13 due to the state's increase in population. In the 2022 elections, per the 2020 United States census, North Carolina gained one new congressional seat for a total of 14.

== Current districts and representatives ==
This is a list of United States representatives from North Carolina, their terms, their district boundaries, and the district political ratings according to the CPVI. The delegation has a total of 14 members, with 10 Republicans and 4 Democrats.

Current U.S. representatives from North Carolina
District	Member (Residence)	Party	Incumbent since	CPVI (2026)	District map
1st	Don Davis (Snow Hill)	Democratic	January 3, 2023	R+5	
2nd	Deborah Ross (Raleigh)	Democratic	January 3, 2021	D+17	
3rd	Greg Murphy (Greenville)	Republican	September 17, 2019	R+6	
4th	Valerie Foushee (Hillsborough)	Democratic	January 3, 2023	D+23	
5th	Virginia Foxx (Banner Elk)	Republican	January 3, 2005	R+9	
6th	Addison McDowell (Bermuda Run)	Republican	January 3, 2025	R+9	
7th	David Rouzer (Wilmington)	Republican	January 3, 2015	R+7	
8th	Mark Harris (Indian Trail)	Republican	January 3, 2025	R+10	
9th	Richard Hudson (Southern Pines)	Republican	January 3, 2013	R+8	
10th	Pat Harrigan (Hickory)	Republican	January 3, 2025	R+9	
11th	Chuck Edwards (Flat Rock)	Republican	January 3, 2023	R+5	
12th	Alma Adams (Charlotte)	Democratic	November 4, 2014	D+24	
13th	Brad Knott (Raleigh)	Republican	January 3, 2025	R+9	
14th	Tim Moore (Kings Mountain)	Republican	January 3, 2025	R+8	

== Legal challenges to redistricting ==
=== 1981 redistricting ===
In 1981, the North Carolina General Assembly proposed a congressional redistricting plan that split Moore County between two districts, the first time a county in North Carolina had ever been thus divided. The Attorney General of North Carolina recommended revising the plan.

=== Constitutionality of the 1990 redistricting ===
After the 1990 census, the US Department of Justice directed North Carolina under VRA preclearance to submit a map with two majority-minority districts. The resultant map with two such congressional districts, the 1st and 12th, was the subject of lawsuits by voters who claimed that it was an illegal racial gerrymander. A three-judge panel of the U.S. District Court for the Eastern District of North Carolina dismissed the suit, which was appealed to the U.S. Supreme Court. On June 28, 1993, the U.S. Supreme Court, in Shaw v. Reno, found that the 12th congressional district was an unlawful racial gerrymander. Justice Sandra Day O'Connor's opinion found that if a district's shape, like the 12th's, was "so bizarre on its face that it is 'unexplainable on grounds other than race'", that it would be subject to strict scrutiny as a racial gerrymander, and remanded the case to the Eastern District of North Carolina.

On August 22, 1994, the Eastern District of North Carolina on remand in Shaw v. Hunt found that the 12th congressional district was a racial gerrymander (as the U.S. Supreme Court had directed), but ruled that the map satisfied strict scrutiny due to the compelling interest of compliance with the Voting Rights Act and increasing black political power. This was again appealed to the U.S. Supreme Court, which reversed the Eastern District of North Carolina on June 13, 1996, and found that the North Carolina plan violated the Equal Protection Clause and that the 12th congressional district did not satisfy a compelling interest.

=== Constitutionality of the 1997 redistricting ===
North Carolina drew a new map following Shaw v. Hunt, and the new maps were challenged in turn. A three-judge panel of the Eastern District of North Carolina granted summary judgment that the new boundaries were an illegal racial gerrymander. This was appealed to the U.S. Supreme Court, which in Hunt v. Cromartie on May 17, 1999, unanimously ruled that the Eastern District of North Carolina was in error to grant summary judgment and remanded the case for the court to hold a trial.

After the ensuing trial, the Eastern District of North Carolina ruled that the 12th district was an illegal racial gerrymander on March 7, 2000. This was again appealed, now as Easley v. Cromartie. The U.S. Supreme Court on April 18, 2001, reversed the Eastern District of North Carolina and ruled that the 12th district boundaries were not racially based but was a partisan gerrymander. They said this was a political question that the courts should not rule upon. Justice O'Connor, the author of Shaw v. Hunt, was the swing justice who switched sides to uphold the district boundaries.

=== Constitutionality of the 2010 redistricting ===
In February 2016, a three-judge panel of U.S. Court of Appeals for the Fourth Circuit and Middle District of North Carolina judges ruled that the 1st and 12th congressional districts' boundaries were unconstitutional and required new maps to be drawn by the legislature to be used for the 2016 election. On 22 May 2017, the U.S. Supreme Court, in Cooper v. Harris, agreed that the 1st and 12th congressional district boundaries were unlawful racial gerrymanders, the latest in a series of cases dating back to 1993 by different parties challenging various configurations of those districts since their first creation.

In January 2018 a federal court struck down North Carolina's congressional map, declaring it unconstitutionally gerrymandered to favor Republican candidates. The court ordered that the General Assembly must redraw the district maps prior to the 2018 elections. However, the U.S. Supreme Court stayed the federal court order pending review, and in June 2019, the U.S. Supreme Court ruled in Rucho v. Common Cause, by a 5–4 vote, that partisan gerrymandering is a "political question" that the federal courts have no place to rule on.

=== Constitutionality of the 2017 redistricting ===
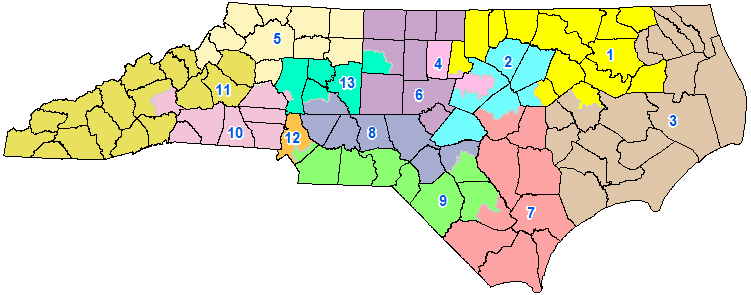
This image shows the previous congressional districts, which were struck down on January 9, 2018 by a federal court. Due to a stay on the decision by the U.S. Supreme Court, these districts were used in the 2018 midterm elections pending appeal. In 2020 a new set of districts were used. Those districts officially went into effect on January 3, 2021.

On September 3, 2019, a three-judge panel in a 357-page ruling unanimously struck down the Republican-led state legislature drawn 2017 enacted maps, which were drawn to replace the 2011 maps which were also ruled unconstitutional and thrown out on racial grounds. The court ruled that the state House and state Senate districts maps were such an extreme partisan gerrymander that they violated the state constitution. In the ruling the state legislature was ordered by the court to immediately start drawing new maps; the court demanded that they be drawn based on criteria like population, contiguity, and county lines. Districts had to be drawn without "partisan considerations and election results data," and done so in plain view, a departure from the closed-door processes the ruling eschews. "At a minimum, that would require all map drawing to occur at public hearings, with any relevant computer screen visible to legislators and public observers." The judges said the new maps had to be completed in two weeks; they also said they reserved the right to move the 2020 primary election if needed.

In October 2019, a panel of three judges ruled that the map was an unfair partisan gerrymander and had to be redrawn. On November 15, 2019, the General Assembly passed a bill that drew new districts that were used for the 2020 elections. The 2nd and 6th congressional districts were drawn to be more favorable to Democrats under the new proposal. On December 2, 2019, a three-judge panel ruled that newly Republican-drawn congressional district maps completed in November 2019 would stand for federal elections in 2020. The maps allowed to stay in place would only be used once. After the 2020 census, the congressional districts would have to be redrawn again.

=== Constitutionality of the 2020 redistricting ===
Congressional district plans passed by the North Carolina General Assembly on November 4, 2021 (top) and February 17, 2022 (bottom), both of which have been struck down by state courts.

On February 4, 2022, the North Carolina Supreme Court struck down the congressional and state legislative district maps drawn by the GOP-controlled General Assembly as an unconstitutional partisan gerrymander in a 4–3 ruling, after a testimony had shown that Republicans were likely to win 10 out of 14 U.S. House seats under the proposed map, an increase from the eight out of 13 that they won in the 2020 elections. New maps, which were ordered to be fair in partisan composition, had to be drawn by the General Assembly within two weeks, under state law.

On February 23, 2022, a panel of three former judges chosen by the Wake County Superior Court drew and approved a new remedial congressional map after the court, earlier that day, struck down the congressional district maps passed by the General Assembly on February 17, 2022, as not meeting standards of partisan fairness. The new maps, which were upheld by the North Carolina Supreme Court later in the night, would apply for the 2022 elections. The General Assembly would then be able to redraw new congressional maps for use in 2024 and subsequent elections until new maps will have to be redrawn for 2032.

==== Later developments ====
On April 28, 2023, the North Carolina Supreme Court—after Republicans gained a majority in the court following the 2022 judicial elections—overturned the same ruling in a 5–2 decision, which cleared the way for gerrymandering in the next redistricting cycle. On October 25, 2023, new maps were approved by the General Assembly. All three new maps heavily favor the GOP, with allegations of racial bias made against the maps as well. Compared to the congressional map used in the 2022 elections, the GOP gained three seats in the House.

In December 2023, two lawsuit were filed in the Middle District of North Carolina, with the first challenging the 1st, 6th, 12th, and 14th congressional districts in the map, and the second, challenging multiple specific districts in the congressional and state legislative district maps, as racial gerrymanders. Both lawsuits were consolidated together in March 2024.

2025 Redistricting

On Wednesday, October 22, 2025 North Carolina lawmakers approved new congressional maps for the state, which change the makeup of Congressional Districts 1 and 3 in Eastern NC. The new maps are abnormal because redistricting typically only happens once every ten years, following the Decennial Census. This is the first time in the modern era that North Carolina has redrawn maps mid-decade without being court-ordered to do so.

== Historical and present district boundaries ==
Table of United States congressional district boundary maps in the State of North Carolina, presented chronologically. All redistricting events that took place in North Carolina between 1973 and 2025 are shown, congressional composition is listed on the right.

Year	Statewide map	Charlotte highlight	Congressional composition
1973–1983			1973–1975: 7 Democrats, 4 Republicans 1975–1977: 9 Democrats, 2 Republicans 1977–1979: 9 Democrats, 2 Republicans 1979–1981: 9 Democrats, 2 Republicans 1981–1983: 7 Democrats, 4 Republicans
1983–1993			1983–1985: 9 Democrats, 2 Republicans 1985–1987: 6 Democrats, 5 Republicans 1987–1989: 8 Democrats, 3 Republicans 1989–1991: 8 Democrats, 3 Republicans 1991–1993: 7 Democrats, 4 Republicans
1993–1999			1993–1995: 8 Democrats, 4 Republicans 1995–1997: 4 Democrats, 8 Republicans 1997–1999: 6 Democrats, 6 Republicans
1999–2001			1999–2001: 5 Democrats, 7 Republicans
2001–2003			2001–2003: 5 Democrats, 7 Republicans
2003–2013			2003–2005: 6 Democrats, 7 Republicans 2005–2007: 6 Democrats, 7 Republicans 2007–2009: 7 Democrats, 6 Republicans 2009–2011: 8 Democrats, 5 Republicans 2011–2013: 7 Democrats, 6 Republicans
2013–2017			2013–2015: 4 Democrats, 9 Republicans 2015–2017: 3 Democrats, 10 Republicans
2017–2021			2017–2019: 3 Democrats, 10 Republicans 2019–2021: 3 Democrats, 10 Republicans
2021–2023			2021–2023: 5 Democrats, 8 Republicans
2023–2025			2023–2025: 7 Democrats, 7 Republicans
2025–2027			
From 2027			

== See also ==
- List of United States congressional districts
- North Carolina's congressional delegations
- North Carolina Democratic Party
- North Carolina Republican Party
- Shaw v. Reno, landmark Supreme Court case relating to gerrymandering
- Rucho v. Common Cause, another Supreme Court gerrymandering case relating to North Carolina's congressional map
