= 1990 United States redistricting cycle =

The 1990 United States redistricting cycle took place following the completion of the 1990 United States census. In all fifty states, various bodies re-drew state legislative and congressional districts. States that are apportioned more than one seat in the United States House of Representatives also drew new districts for that legislative body. The resulting new districts were first implemented for the 1991 and 1992 elections, which saw Democrats lose nine seats from their U.S. House majority and lose sixteen state legislative chambers but continue to retain a majority of state legislative seats nationwide throughout the decade. To date, it is the last time that Democrats held a majority of state legislative seats throughout an entire census cycle.

The districts drawn in the 1990 redistricting cycle remained in effect until the next round of redistricting following the 2000 United States census.

== Reapportionment ==
The results of the 1990 census determined the number of seats that each state receives in the United States House of Representatives starting with the 1992 elections. Consequently, this affected the number of votes each state has in the Electoral College for the 1992 presidential election.

Because of population changes, twenty-one states had changes in their number of seats. Eight states gained at least one seat, and thirteen states lost at least one seat. The final result involved 19 seats being switched.

Gained seven seats	Gained four seats	Gained three seats	Gained one seat	Lost one seat	Lost two seats	Lost three seats
California	Florida	Texas	Arizona; Georgia; North Carolina; Virginia; Washington	Iowa; Kansas; Kentucky; Louisiana; Massachusetts; Montana; New Jersey; West Virginia	Illinois; Michigan; Ohio; Pennsylvania	New York

=== Newly created districts and eliminated districts ===
The new seats were first contested in the 1992 United States House of Representatives elections.

Eliminated districts	Created districts
Illinois 21; Illinois 22; Iowa 6; Kansas 5; Kentucky 7; Louisiana 8; Massachusetts 11; Michigan 17; Michigan 18; Montana 1; Montana 2; New Jersey 14; New York 32; New York 33; New York 34; Ohio 20; Ohio 21; Pennsylvania 22; Pennsylvania 23; West Virginia 4	Arizona 6; California 46; California 47; California 48; California 49; California 50; California 51; California 52; Florida 20; Florida 21; Florida 22; Florida 23; Georgia 11; Montana at-large; North Carolina 12; Texas 28; Texas 29; Texas 30; Virginia 11; Washington 9

== Means of redistricting ==
The method of redistricting for a majority of maps implemented was through legislative committee. Democrats were initially buoyed by the results of the 1990 election, which gave them trifecta control of key Sunbelt states, like California, Texas and Florida, which gained multiple congressional seats at the expense of Midwestern and Northeastern states.

== Subsequent litigation ==
=== Racial gerrymandering ===
The cycle saw a large number of lawsuits and settlements regarding racial gerrymandering:

- Clark v. Roemer (1991)
- Chisom v. Roemer (1991)
- Houston Lawyers' Association v. Attorney General of Texas (1991)
- Presley v. Etowah County Comm'n (1992)
- Growe v. Emison (1993)
- Voinovich v. Quilter (1993)
- Shaw v. Reno (1993)
- Holder v. Hall (1994)
- Johnson v. De Grandy (1994)
- United States v. Hays (1995)
- Miller v. Johnson (1995)
- Shaw v. Hunt (1996)
- Bush v. Vera (1996)
- Lopez v. Monterey County (1996)
- Reno v. Bossier Parish School Board (1997)
- Abrams v. Johnson (1997)
- Lopez v. Monterey County (1999)
- Hunt v. Cromartie (1999)
- Reno v. Bossier Parish School Board (2000)
- Sinkfield v. Kelley (2000)

=== Other litigation ===
- Utah v. Evans (2002)
- Branch v. Smith (2003)
- Lance v. Dennis (2006)
- Lance v. Coffman (2007)
