= Redistricting in North Carolina =

USA gerrymandering controversy (2010–)

Redistricting in North Carolina has been a controversial topic due to allegations and admissions of gerrymandering.

== Constitutional requirements ==
The Constitution of North Carolina states:

Article 1, Section 10:

"All elections shall be free".

Article II, Section 3:

The Senators shall be elected from districts. The General Assembly, at the first regular session convening after the return of every decennial census of population taken by order of Congress, shall revise the senate districts and the apportionment of Senators among those districts, subject to the following requirements:

(1) Each Senator shall represent, as nearly as may be, an equal number of inhabitants, the number of inhabitants that each Senator represents being determined for this purpose by dividing the population of the district that he represents by the number of Senators apportioned to that district; (2) Each senate district shall at all times consist of contiguous territory; (3) No county shall be divided in the formation of a senate district;

(4) When established, the senate districts and the apportionment of Senators shall remain unaltered until the return of another decennial census of population taken by order of Congress.

Article II, Section 4:

The Representatives shall be elected from districts. The General Assembly, at the first regular session convening after the return of every decennial census of population taken by order of Congress, shall revise the representative districts and the apportionment of Representatives among those districts, subject to the following requirements:

(1) Each Representative shall represent, as nearly as may be, an equal number of inhabitants, the number of inhabitants that each Representative represents being determined for this purpose by dividing the population of the district that he represents by the number of Representatives apportioned to that district; (2) Each representative district shall at all times consist of contiguous territory; (3) No county shall be divided in the formation of a representative district;

(4) When established, the representative districts and the apportionment of Representatives shall remain unaltered until the return of another decennial census of population taken by order of Congress.

== Prior to 2010 ==
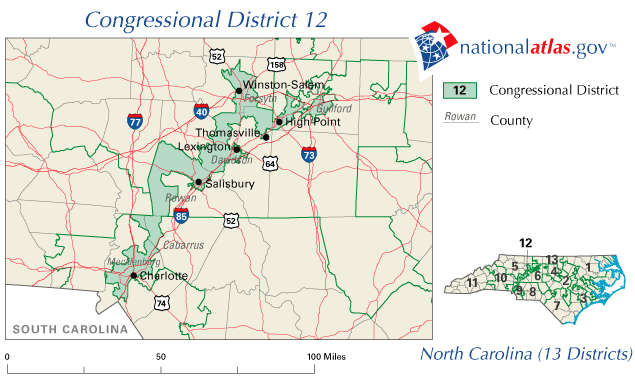
Shaw v. Reno was a United States Supreme Court case involving a claim that North Carolina's 12th congressional district (pictured) was affirmatively racially gerrymandered.

The U.S. Supreme Court had ruled in Davis v. Bandemer (1986) that partisan gerrymandering violates the Equal Protection Clause and is a justiciable matter. However, the court found it difficult to apply the precedent in other cases. Only in one subsequent case, Republican Party of North Carolina v. Martin (1992), did a lower court strike down a redistricting plan on partisan gerrymandering grounds.

Instead, the Supreme Court found it easier to rule on racial gerrymanders under existing federal law. While the Equal Protection Clause, along with Section 2 and Section 5 of the Voting Rights Act, prohibit jurisdictions from gerrymandering electoral districts to dilute the votes of racial groups, the Supreme Court has held that in some instances, the Equal Protection Clause prevents jurisdictions from drawing district lines to favor racial groups. The Supreme Court first recognized these "affirmative racial gerrymandering" claims in Shaw v. Reno (Shaw I) (1993), holding that plaintiffs "may state a claim by alleging that [redistricting] legislation, though race neutral on its face, rationally cannot be understood as anything other than an effort to separate voters into different districts on the basis of race, and that the separation lacks sufficient justification". The Supreme Court reasoned that these claims were cognizable because relying on race in redistricting "reinforces racial stereotypes and threatens to undermine our system of representative democracy by signaling to elected officials that they represent a particular racial group rather than their constituency as a whole". Later opinions characterized the type of unconstitutional harm created by racial gerrymandering as an "expressive harm", which law professor Richard Pildes and political scientist Richard Neimi have described as a harm "that results from the idea or attitudes expressed through a governmental action."

== 2010–2019 ==
Following the Republican win of majorities in both houses of the General Assembly in the November 2010 elections, the Republican leadership set out to protect their wins by redrawing both legislative and congressional maps in their favor. This resulted in subsequent elections in which Republicans won a disproportionate number of seats, compared to the percentage of votes received by Republicans.

=== Cooper v. Harris (2017) ===
On February 5, 2016, a three-judge panel of U.S. Court of Appeals for the Fourth Circuit and U.S. District Court for the Middle District of North Carolina judges ruled that the 1st and 12th districts' boundaries were unconstitutional and required new maps to be drawn by the legislature to be used for the 2016 election. On May 22, 2017, the U.S. Supreme Court, in Cooper v. Harris, agreed that the 1st and 12th congressional district boundaries were unlawful racial gerrymanders, the latest in a series of cases dating back to 1993 by different parties challenging various configurations of those districts since their first creation. The Republican General Assembly caucus proceeded to revise congressional maps for subsequent elections to be less racially defined.

=== Rucho v Common Cause (2019) ===
Yet another partisan redistricting case was heard by the Supreme Court during the 2018 term. Rucho v. Common Cause deals with Republican-favored gerrymandering in North Carolina. The District Court had ruled the redistricting was unconstitutional prior to Gill; an initial challenge brought to the Supreme Court resulted in an order for the District Court to re-evaluate their decision in light of Gill. The District Court, on rehearing, affirmed their previous decision. The state Republicans again sought for review by the Supreme Court, which is scheduled to issue its opinion by June 2018.

Rucho v. Common Cause and Lamone v. Benisek were decided on June 27, 2019, which, in the 5–4 decision, determined that judging partisan gerrymandering cases is outside of the remit of the federal court system due to the political questions involved. The majority opinion stated that extreme partisan gerrymandering is still unconstitutional, but it is up to Congress and state legislative bodies to find ways to restrict that, such as through the use of independent redistricting commissions.

=== Hofeller files ===
On the same day as the Rucho decision, the U.S. Supreme Court ruled against the federal government in Department of Commerce v. New York, stating that while the bid to add a citizenship question to the 2020 United States census could be upheld under the Enumeration clause, the explanation provided by the Commerce Department for the question was insufficient. An advocate of the question, Thomas Hofeller, was also the chief redistricting expert employed by the North Carolina Republican Party and the Republican National Committee in the 2010s to redraw legislative and congressional maps for North Carolina and other states. One of his arguments noted that such a question "would be advantageous to Republicans and non-Hispanic whites." Following his death in August 2018, his estranged daughter turned over his documents to litigants in Commerce and other ongoing cases against the citizenship question in lower court, who subsequently filed motions to sanction the Department of Commerce for obfuscating Hofeller's role in how the question became framed.

=== Common Cause v. Lewis (2019) ===
On September 3, 2019, the 3-judge panel (2 Democrats, 1 Republican) of the Wake County Superior Court unanimously struck down North Carolina's current legislative map as unconstitutional, without referring to federal law. Instead, the Court ruled that the map violated the state constitution's guarantees of free elections, equal protection, freedom of speech and freedom of assembly. The decision also cited the Hofeller files as evidence of the goal of the Republican Party to maximize the number of Republican seats in the General Assembly. The Superior Court gave the North Carolina General Assembly two weeks to draw up a new map prior to the 2020 election. The Senate President pro tempore Phil Berger announced that the Republican caucus would comply with the ruling and would not appeal to the North Carolina Supreme Court.

== 2020–present ==
In 2020, the North Carolina State House of Representatives was tasked with redrawing district lines due to new census data. The census data was delayed due to COVID-19 complications. On November 5, the NC house voted on the maps and passed house map CBK-3, going from 13 districts to 14. On December 7, the North Carolina Supreme Court halted candidate filing due to pending lawsuits. On January 7, a panel of 3 judges ruled that maps were constitutional after a 3-day trial.

However, on February 4, 2022, the Supreme Court, by a 4–3 decision struck the maps down, saying that the maps were "unconstitutional beyond a reasonable doubt" under multiple clauses of North Carolina State Constitution. On February 23, the court upheld new maps approved by a Wake County trial court.

=== Moore v. Harper (2023) ===
On February 25, 2022, the General Assembly requested a stay on the use of the maps drawn by the North Carolina Supreme Court from the United States Supreme Court. While the stay was initially denied, a writ of certiorari was subsequently requested, and granted on June 30, 2022. The case deals with the Independent state legislature theory, based on the Elections Clause of the United States, and has been described as a potentially landmark case in the administration of federal elections in the United States.

=== 2023 ===
After the 2022 North Carolina judicial elections, Republicans gained control of the North Carolina Supreme Court. The court then ruled partisan gerrymandering in North Carolina was not unconstitutional, reversing the previous ruling. The state then redrew the maps to turn a split 7-7 delegation into a 10-4 Republican majority. As Republicans only attained a three seat majority in the House following the 2024 United States House of Representatives elections, the gerrymander played a direct control in partisan control of the chamber.

=== 2025 ===
In September 2025, lawmakers in the U.S. state of North Carolina began considering a legislative redistricting plan ahead of the 2026 United States House of Representatives elections.

On October 13, 2025, North Carolina House Speaker Destin Hall and Senate leader Phil Berger released a joint statement announcing a planned vote on new congressional districts, making the competitive 1st congressional district more Republican leaning.

==== Background ====
In early 2025, the Trump administration urged Republican Party leadership in states with Republican controlled state legislatures to redistrict in order to draw more Republican seats and benefit Republicans. Along with redistricting in other red states, the proposal began amid concern from Trump and his allies that a Republican loss in the 2026 United States House of Representatives elections could damage Trump's legislative agenda and lead to investigations.

The North Carolina legislature already redrew the state’s congressional districts in 2023 to be beneficial to the Republican Party, allowing them to pick up 3 seats in the 2024 elections. In September 2025 it was reported that Senate leader Phil Berger would redraw the state's congressional districts in order to gain Trump's endorsement, which he denied. However, Berger said he was open to redrawing the congressional lines once again in order to match potential gains from California's Proposition 50. This statement received backlash from Governor Josh Stein (who cannot veto a potential map), who stated such a redraw would be "ridiculous to do so".

==== Impact ====
A proposed redistricting map intends to give Republicans one additional seat in the 2026 United States House of Representatives elections likely in the 1st congressional district making it harder for representative Don Davis to be re-elected in 2026. However, due to the strong blue wave in 2026, as well as Roy Cooper’s landslide win in the concurrent Senate election, the redistricting ended up flipping around six seats to Democrat control.

== See also ==
- North Carolina's congressional districts
- Elections in North Carolina
- 2020 United States census
- 2020 United States redistricting cycle
