= Bush v. Vera =

1996 United States Supreme Court case

- Supreme Court of the United States

Argued December 5, 1995 Decided June 13, 1996
- Full case name: George W. Bush, Governor of Texas, et al., Appellants v. Vera, et al.; Lawson, et al. v. Vera
- Citations: 517 U.S. 952 (more) 116 S. Ct. 1941; 135 L. Ed. 2d 248

Case history
- Prior: Appeal from the United States District Court for the Southern District of Texas, sub nom. Vera v. Richards, 861 F. Supp. 1304 (1994)
- Subsequent: 980 F. Supp. 254

Holding
- In its 1991 congressional redistricting scheme, Texas subordinated race-neutral, traditional districting considerations to racial factors. This subjected the racially discriminatory plan to strict scrutiny under the 14th Amendment to the U.S. Constitution and the districting plan was deemed not narrowly tailored to meet a compelling state interest.

Court membership
- Chief Justice William Rehnquist Associate Justices John P. Stevens · Sandra Day O'Connor; Antonin Scalia · Anthony Kennedy; David Souter · Clarence Thomas; Ruth Bader Ginsburg · Stephen Breyer

Case opinions
- Plurality: O'Connor, joined by Rehnquist, Kennedy
- Concurrence: O'Connor
- Concurrence: Kennedy
- Concurrence: Thomas (in judgment), joined by Scalia
- Dissent: Stevens, joined by Ginsburg, Breyer
- Dissent: Souter, joined by Ginsburg, Breyer

Laws applied
- U.S. Const. amend. XIV, the Voting Rights Act of 1965, 42 U.S.C. § 1973; Texas Acts 1991, 72nd Leg., 2nd C.S., Chap. 7

Bush v. Vera, 517 U.S. 952 (1996), is a United States Supreme Court case concerning racial gerrymandering, where racial minority majority-electoral districts were created during Texas' 1990 redistricting to increase minority Congressional representation. The Supreme Court, in a plurality opinion, held that race was the predominant factor in the creation of the districts and that under a strict scrutiny standard the three districts were not narrowly tailored to further a compelling governmental interest.

== Background ==
As a result of rapid population growth in Texas the state gained three additional congressional districts in the 1990 United States redistricting cycle.

In 1991, the Texas Legislature decided to draw one new Hispanic-majority district in South Texas (District 28), one new African-American majority district in Dallas County (District 30), and one new Hispanic-majority district in the Houston area (District 29). In addition, the Legislature decided to reconfigure an existing minority-majority district in the Houston area (District 18) to increase its percentage of African-Americans.

The Texas Legislature had developed a state-of-the-art computer system, RedApl, that allowed it to draw congressional districts using racial data at the census block level. Working closely with the Texas congressional delegation and various members of the Legislature who intended to run for Congress, the Texas Legislature took great care to draw three new districts and reconfigure districts that the chosen candidates could win.

The Department of Justice precleared the plan under section 5 of the Voting Rights Act of 1965 (52 U.S.C. § 10304) and it was used in the 1992 United States elections.

Plaintiffs Al Vera, Edward Blum, Polly Orcutt, Ken Powers, Barbara Thomas, and Ed Chen challenged 24 of the state's 30 congressional districts as racial gerrymanders. A three-judge panel of the federal district, consisting of United States Court of Appeals for the Fifth Circuit Judge Edith H. Jones, United States District Judges Melinda Harmon and David Hittner, struck down three Districts (18, 29, and 30) but the decision was stayed pending appeal, so the plan continued in use for the 1994 general election.

== Opinion of the Court ==
The Court, in a plurality opinion written by Justice Sandra Day O'Connor, upheld the state court's decision. The Court assumed that compliance with § 2 of the Voting Rights Act was a compelling state interest, and held that departure from traditional redistricting principles was not narrowly tailored for § 2 compliance.

First the Court considered whether strict scrutiny applied to the redistricting challenge by applying the precedents Shaw v. Reno and Miller v. Johnson. After reviewing the District Court's findings and the record, the Supreme Court sustained the lower court's determination that race was the "predominant factor" in drawing each of the challenged districts, thus subjecting them to strict scrutiny. The District Court had ample evidence to conclude that racial motivations had a greater influence on the drawing of district lines than political motivations. Citing a respected study that ranked Texas' 1991 plan among the worst in the country, the justices saw no reason to dispute the District Court's conclusion that the challenged districts "have no integrity in terms of traditional, neutral redistricting criteria."

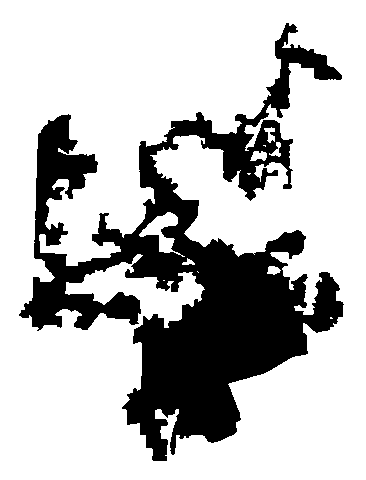
Outline of Texas's 30th congressional district that was struck down in Bush v. Vera.

The State argued, for example, that the bizarre shape of District 30 in Dallas County was explained by the drafters' desire to unite urban communities of interest and that the bizarre shape of all three districts was attributable to the Legislature's efforts to protect incumbents of old districts while designing the new ones. The Court concluded that "the contours of Congressional District 30 are unexplainable in terms other than race". Justice O'Connor repeated what the Court had said in Miller v. Johnson: strict scrutiny applies when racial considerations predominate over traditional, race-neutral districting factors. Justice O'Connor further noted that:

[B]izarre shape and noncompactness cause constitutional harm insofar as they convey the message that political identity is, or should be, predominantly racial. . . . [C]utting across pre-existing precinct lines and other natural or traditional divisions, is not merely evidentially significant; it is part of the constitutional problem insofar as it disrupts nonracial bases of identity and thus intensifies the emphasis on race.

Having concluded that strict scrutiny applied, the Court considered whether the districts were narrowly tailored to comply with the Voting Rights Act. Although compliance with the Voting Rights Act is assumed to be a compelling interest, a state must have a "strong basis in evidence" for concluding that a majority-minority district is reasonably necessary to comply with Section 2, and the district must "substantially address" the potential violation. States have some leeway when drawing districts to avoid being trapped between the "competing hazards of liability" under the Voting Rights Act and constitutional challenges. Therefore, a § 2 district that is reasonably compact and regular, taking into account traditional districting principles such as maintaining communities of interest and traditional boundaries, may pass strict scrutiny without having to defeat rival compact districts designed by plaintiffs' experts in endless "beauty contests.". In this case the Supreme Court held that the state's departure from traditional redistricting principles was not required for § 2 compliance.

The Court found that the district lines were not justified as an attempt to remedy the effects of past discrimination, since there was no evidence of present discrimination other than racially polarized voting. Since racially polarized voting only served to make a case for a violation of § 2, and the plan was not narrowly tailored to remedy a § 2 violation, the bizarre shapes were not justified.

The Court found that creation of District 18, the reconfigured African-American district in the Houston area, was not justified as an attempt to avoid retrogression under § 5, since it actually increased the African-American voting population from 40.8 percent to 50.9 percent.

=== Concurrences ===
In an unusual move, Justice O'Connor wrote a concurrence to her own opinion in which she expressed her view on two points: first, compliance with the results test of §2 of the Voting Rights Act is a compelling state interest, and second, that the test can co-exist in principle and in practice with Shaw v. Reno and its progeny.

Justice Anthony Kennedy, who joined in the plurality opinion, wrote separately to express his view that anytime a district is drawn with a pre-ordained racial composition that strict scrutiny would apply.

Justice Clarence Thomas issued a concurring opinion in which Justice Antonin Scalia joined which stated that "Strict scrutiny applies to all governmental classifications based on race, and we have expressly held that there is no exception for race based redistricting."

=== Dissents ===
There were two dissents filed in this case, one by Justice John Paul Stevens in which Justices Ruth Bader Ginsburg and Stephen Breyer joined and one by Justice David Souter, in which Ginsburg and Breyer also joined.

== See also ==
- Wesberry v. Sanders, 376 U.S. 1 (1964)
- Wright v. Rockefeller, 376 U.S. 52 (1964)
- Shaw v. Reno, 509 U.S. 630 (1993)
- Miller v. Johnson, 515 U.S. 900 (1995)
- Hunt v. Cromartie, 526 U.S. 541 (1999)
- Easley v. Cromartie, 532 U.S. 234 (2001)
- Georgia v. Ashcroft, 539 U.S. 461 (2003)
- League of United Latin American Citizens v. Perry, 548 U.S. 399 (2006)
- Alabama Legislative Black Caucus v. Alabama, No. 13-895, 575 U.S. ___ (2015)
