= Cooper v. Harris =

- Supreme Court of the United States

Argued December 5, 2016 Decided May 22, 2017
- Full case name: Roy Cooper, Governor of North Carolina, et al., appellants vs. David Harris, et al.
- Docket no.: 15-1262
- Citations: 581 U.S. 285 (more) 136 S. Ct. 2512; 197 L. Ed. 2d 837

Case history
- Prior: Harris v. McCrory, 159 F. Supp. 3d 600 (M.D.N.C. 2016); probable jurisdiction noted, 136 S. Ct. 2512 (2016).

Holding
- North Carolina relied too heavily on race in redrawing two Congressional districts after the 2010 Census

Court membership
- Chief Justice John Roberts Associate Justices Anthony Kennedy · Clarence Thomas; Ruth Bader Ginsburg · Stephen Breyer; Samuel Alito · Sonia Sotomayor; Elena Kagan · Neil Gorsuch

Case opinions
- Majority: Kagan, joined by Thomas, Ginsburg, Breyer, Sotomayor
- Concurrence: Thomas
- Concur/dissent: Alito, joined by Roberts, Kennedy
- Gorsuch took no part in the consideration or decision of the case.

Laws applied
- U.S. Const. amend. XIV; Voting Rights Act of 1965

Cooper v. Harris, 581 U.S. 285 (2017), is a decision by the Supreme Court of the United States in which the Court ruled 5–3 that the North Carolina General Assembly used race too heavily in re-drawing two Congressional districts following the 2010 Census.

== Background ==
Under the Fourteenth Amendment to the United States Constitution, a state generally cannot draw voting districts primarily on the basis of race unless it has sufficient justification.

In racial gerrymandering cases, appellate courts give substantial deference to a district court's factual findings, particularly its determination whether race predominated in drawing district lines. Although appellate courts may freely correct legal errors, factual findings are reviewed only for clear error and may not be overturned simply because the appellate court would have reached a different conclusion. If a district court's finding is plausible in light of the full record, it must be upheld even if another interpretation appears equally or more plausible.

At issue in particular were the 1st and 12th districts after the 2010 United States redistricting cycle. They are the same districts that were challenged in Shaw v. Reno (1993) and Shaw v. Hunt (1996). After District 12 was redrawn to comply with Shaw II, the new district was upheld by the Supreme Court as a partisan gerrymander in Hunt v. Cromartie (1999) and Easley v. Cromartie (2001).

After the 2010 census, the State again redrew its congressional districts. The 2011 congressional map substantially altered both District 1 and District 12. Because District 1 was significantly underpopulated following the 2010 census, state legislators expanded it into heavily Black areas of Durham to add nearly 100,000 residents, increasing the district's Black voting-age population (BVAP) from 48.6% to 52.7%. District 12, although only slightly overpopulated and not requiring major population adjustments, was also reconfigured. Its boundaries were narrowed and extended, resulting in the addition of approximately 35,000 Black voting-age residents and the removal of about 50,000 white voting-age residents. These changes increased District 12's BVAP from 43.8% to 50.7%.

Registered voters in Districts 1 and 12 filed suit against North Carolina officials, alleging that the State had engaged in unconstitutional racial gerrymandering in drawing the districts' boundaries. Voters in Mecklenburg County asserted that the 1st was "akin to a Rorschach ink blot," and that the 12th, though 120 miles long, at times "averag[ed] only a few miles wide." The 12th had already been a part of several cases that went to the Supreme Court. On February 5, 2016, the three-judge United States District Court for the Middle District of North Carolina found that both districts were unconstitutional due to the predominance of racial considerations in their creation, in which Circuit Judge Roger Gregory was joined by Judge Max O. Cogburn Jr., over the dissent of Judge William Lindsay Osteen Jr. regarding District 12.

== Supreme Court ==
On May 22, 2017, Justice Elena Kagan delivered the Court's judgment in favor of Harris, voting 5–3 to affirm the judgment of the district court. Justice Samuel Alito, joined by Chief Justice John Roberts and Justice Anthony Kennedy, issued an opinion concurring in the judgment and dissenting in part, arguing that District 12 was constitutional. Neil Gorsuch did not take part in the case, which was argued before he was confirmed to the Supreme Court.

On December 5, 2016, oral arguments were heard before the Supreme Court, where Paul Clement appeared for the governor, Marc Elias appeared for the voters, and an assistant to the U.S. Solicitor General appeared as an amicus curiae in support of the voters.

=== Decision ===
The Supreme Court held that the District Court did not clearly err in finding that race predominated in the drawing of District 1. The evidence showed that mapmakers pursued an explicit racial target, subordinated other districting considerations to that objective, and drew boundaries that increased racial divisions, leading the court to regard District 1 as a clear example of race-based districting.

The Supreme Court applied a two-step test, developed in Miller v. Johnson and reaffirmed in Bethune-Hill v. Virginia State Board of Elections:

1. The plaintiff must prove "race was the predominant factor motivating the legislature's decision"
2. If race predominated, the state must satisfy strict scrutiny by showing that the racial classification was narrowly tailored to serve a compelling state interest

The state argued that the African-American population of the districts was increased in order to comply with the Voting Rights Act of 1965, but the Court found that argument "does not withstand strict scrutiny" for the 1st district, as its African-American population had previously been less than a majority of its voters, yet African-Americans' "preferred candidates scored consistent victories."

Because a significant number of white voters supported the candidates preferred by Black voters, the 1st district functioned as a crossover district rather than one characterized by effective white bloc voting. As a result, the State had no reason to conclude that the Voting Rights Act required increasing the district's Black voting-age population above 50 percent.

The legality of District 12 depended on whether its redesign was driven predominantly by race or by politics. The Supreme Court emphasized that its role was limited to reviewing the District Court's finding of racial predominance for clear error. Applying that standard, the Court upheld the District Court's conclusion that race, rather than politics, predominated in the redesign of District 12.

When the state redrew the maps from the District Order, they did not use any racial profiling data, but did rely heavily on partisan distributions. The subsequent map has been challenged again, and the case was heard by the Supreme Court as Rucho v. Common Cause in March 2019.
