= 2000 United States House of Representatives elections in North Carolina =

- November 3, 2000

All 12 North Carolina seats in the United States House of Representatives
	Majority party	Minority party
Party	Republican	Democratic
Last election	7	5
Seats won	7	5
Seat change	Steady	Steady
Popular vote	1,514,806	1,193,600
Percentage	54.53%	42.97%
Swing	▲1.27%	▼0.48%

Republican
40–50%
50–60%
60–70%
70–80%
80–90%
90–100%
Democratic
40–50%
50–60%
60–70%
70–80%
80–90%

The United States House of Representative elections of 2000 in North Carolina were held on 3 November 2000 as part of the biennial election to the United States House of Representatives. All twelve seats in North Carolina, and 435 nationwide, were elected.

As in 1998, no districts changed hands, with the Republicans winning seven and the Democrats winning five of the twelve seats. All incumbents ran for office again, with all winning, meaning that no new representatives were elected.

== Redistricting ==
North Carolina drew a new map following Shaw v. Hunt, and the new maps were challenged in turn. A three-judge panel of the Eastern District of North Carolina granted summary judgment that the new boundaries were an illegal racial gerrymander. This was appealed to the U.S. Supreme Court, which in Hunt v. Cromartie on May 17, 1999, unanimously ruled that the Eastern District of North Carolina was in error to grant summary judgment and remanded the case for the court to hold a trial.

After the ensuing trial, the Eastern District of North Carolina ruled that the 12th district was an illegal racial gerrymander on March 7, 2000. This was again appealed, now as Easley v. Cromartie. The U.S. Supreme Court on April 18, 2001, reversed the Eastern District of North Carolina and ruled that the 12th district boundaries were not racially based but was a partisan gerrymander. They said this was a political question that the courts should not rule upon. Justice O'Connor, the author of Shaw v. Hunt, was the swing justice who switched sides to uphold the district boundaries.

== Summary ==
2000 United States House of Representative elections in North Carolina – Summary
Party	Seats	Gains	Losses	Net gain/loss	Seats %	Votes %	Votes	+/−
Republican	7	0	0	±0	58.33	54.53	1,514,806	+1.27
Democratic	5	0	0	±0	41.67	42.97	1,193,600	–0.48
Libertarian	0	0	0	±0	0	2.50	69,544	–0.79
Reform	0	0	0	±0	0	0.04	1,218	N/A
Independent	0	0	0	±0	0	0.02	632	N/A

== District 1 ==
2000 North Carolina's 1st congressional district election
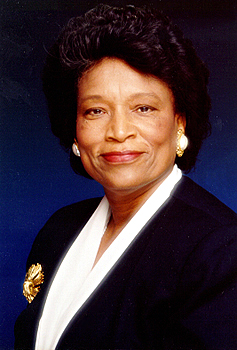

Nominee	Eva M. Clayton	Duane E. Kratzer, Jr.
Party	Democratic	Republican
Popular vote	124,171	62,198
Percentage	62.3%	32.9%
U.S. Representative before election
Eva M. Clayton
Democratic
Elected U.S. Representative
Eva M. Clayton
Democratic

2000 United States House of Representatives North Carolina 1st District election
Party	Candidate	Votes	%	±%
Democratic	Eva M. Clayton (incumbent)	124,171	62.25	+3.39
Republican	Duane E. Kratzer, Jr.	62,198	32.88	–4.11
Libertarian	Christopher Sean Delaney	2,799	1.48	+0.72
Turnout		189,168		

== District 2 ==
2000 North Carolina's 2nd congressional district election
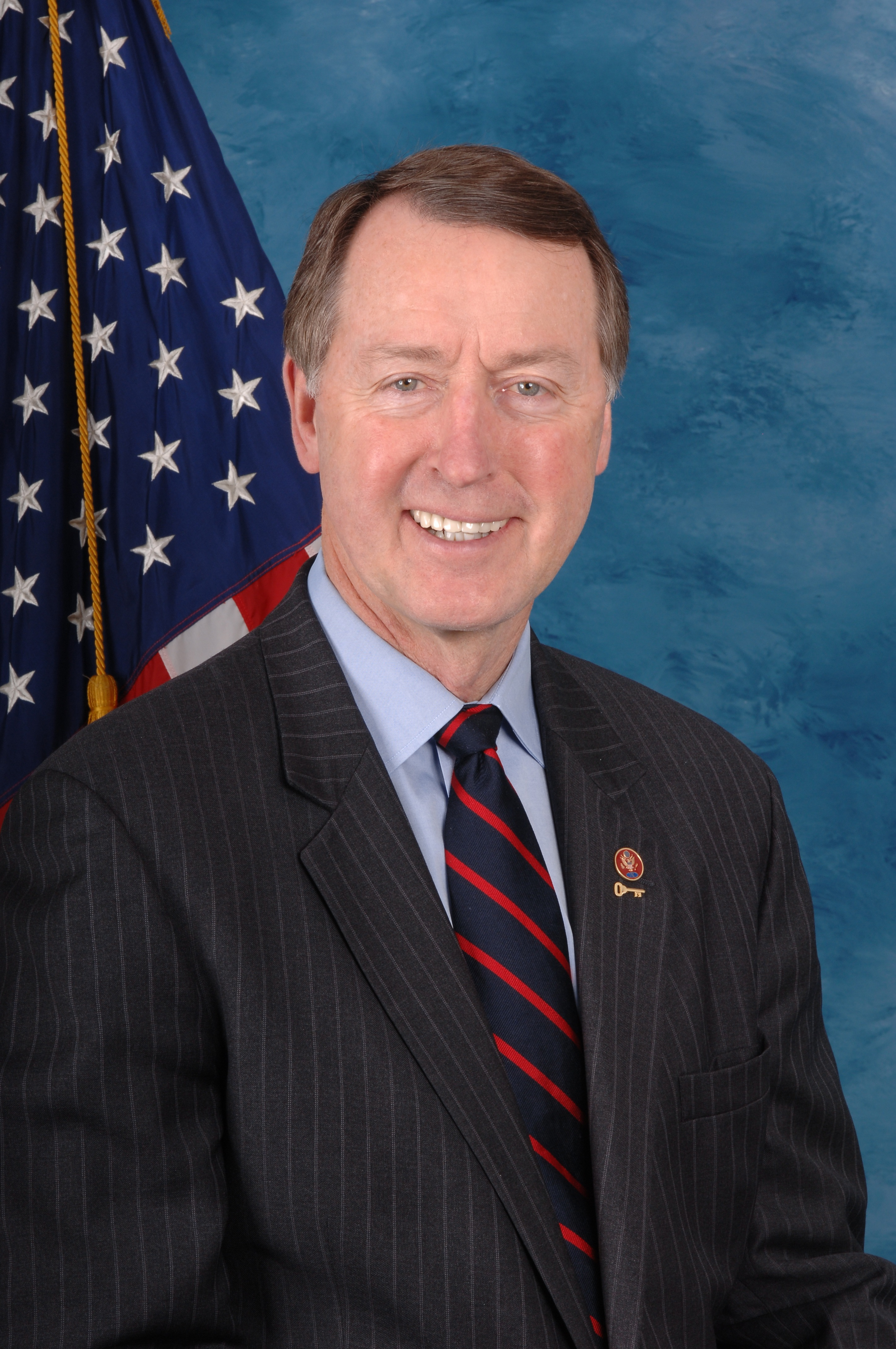

Nominee	Bob Etheridge	Doug Haynes
Party	Democratic	Republican
Popular vote	146,733	103,011
Percentage	58.3%	41.7%
- County results Etheridge: 50–60% 60–70% Haynes: 50–60%
U.S. Representative before election
Bob Etheridge
Democratic
Elected U.S. Representative
Bob Etheridge
Democratic

2000 United States House of Representatives North Carolina 2nd District election
Party	Candidate	Votes	%	±%
Democratic	Bob Etheridge (incumbent)	146,733	58.26	+0.87
Republican	Doug Haynes	103,011	41.67	–0.76
Libertarian	Mark Daniel Jackson	2,094	0.83	–0.11
Turnout		251,838		

== District 3 ==
2000 North Carolina's 3rd congressional district election
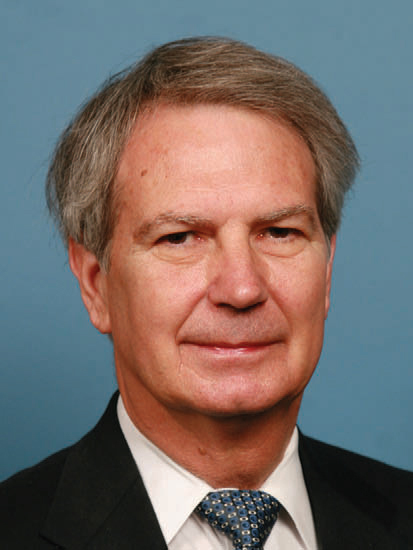

Nominee	Walter B. Jones Jr.	Leigh Harvey McNairy
Party	Republican	Democratic
Popular vote	121,940	74,058
Percentage	61.4%	37.3%
- County results Jones: 40–50% 50–60% 60–70% Mcnairy: 50–60%
U.S. Representative before election
Walter B. Jones Jr.
Republican
Elected U.S. Representative
Walter B. Jones Jr.
Republican

2000 United States House of Representatives North Carolina 3rd District election
Party	Candidate	Votes	%	±%
Republican	Walter B. Jones Jr. (incumbent)	121,940	61.44	–0.47
Democratic	Leigh Harvey McNairy	74,058	37.32	+0.23
Libertarian	David F. Russell	2,457	1.24	+0.24
Turnout		198,455		

== District 4 ==
2000 North Carolina's 4th congressional district election
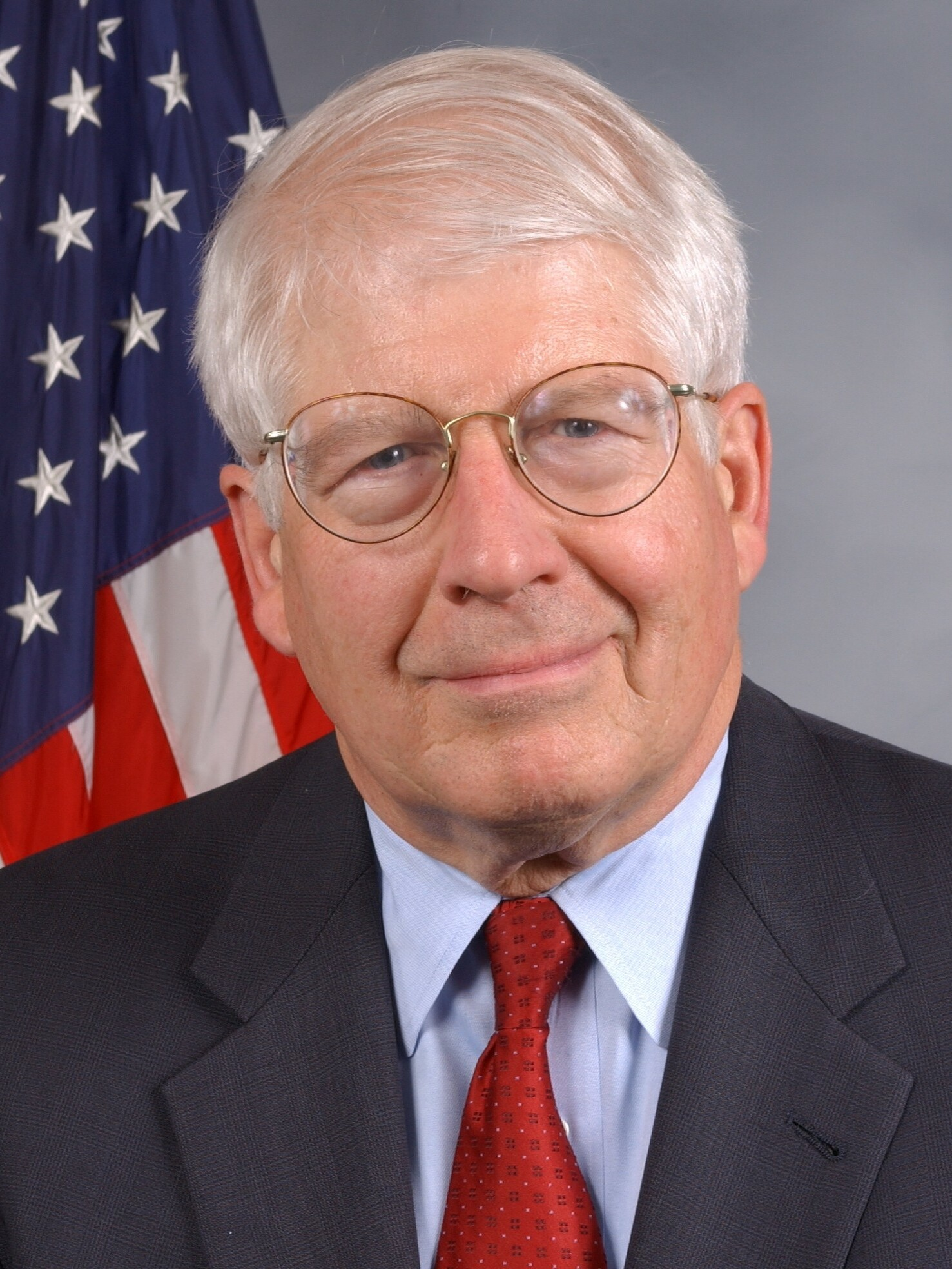

Nominee	David Price	Jess Ward
Party	Democratic	Republican
Popular vote	200,885	119,412
Percentage	61.6%	36.6%
- County results Price: 50–60% 60–70% 70–80%
U.S. Representative before election
David Price
Democratic
Elected U.S. Representative
David Price
Democratic

2000 United States House of Representatives North Carolina 4th District election
Party	Candidate	Votes	%	±%
Democratic	David Price (incumbent)	200,885	61.65	+4.22
Republican	Jess Ward	119,412	36.64	–4.91
Libertarian	C. Brian Towey	5,573	1.71	+0.69
Turnout		325,870		

== District 5 ==
2000 North Carolina's 5th congressional district election
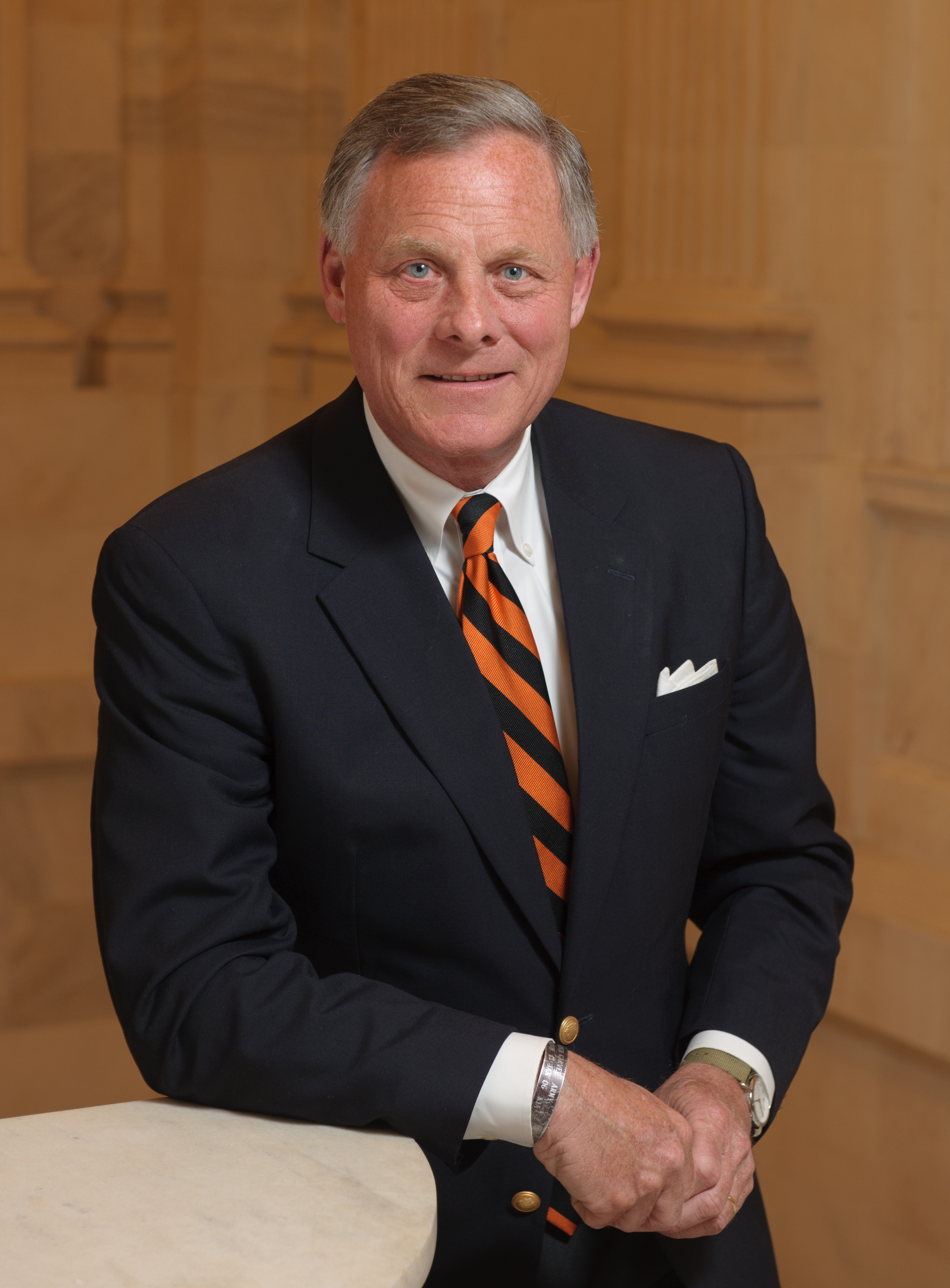

Nominee	Richard Burr	Steven Francis LeBoeuf
Party	Republican	Libertarian
Popular vote	172,489	13,366
Percentage	92.8%	7.2%
- County results Burr: 90–100%
U.S. Representative before election
Richard Burr
Republican
Elected U.S. Representative
Richard Burr
Republican

2000 United States House of Representatives North Carolina 5th District election
Party	Candidate	Votes	%	±%
Republican	Richard Burr (incumbent)	172,489	92.81	+25.25
Libertarian	Steven Francis LeBoeuf	13,366	7.19	+6.41
Turnout		185,855		

== District 6 ==
2000 North Carolina's 6th congressional district election
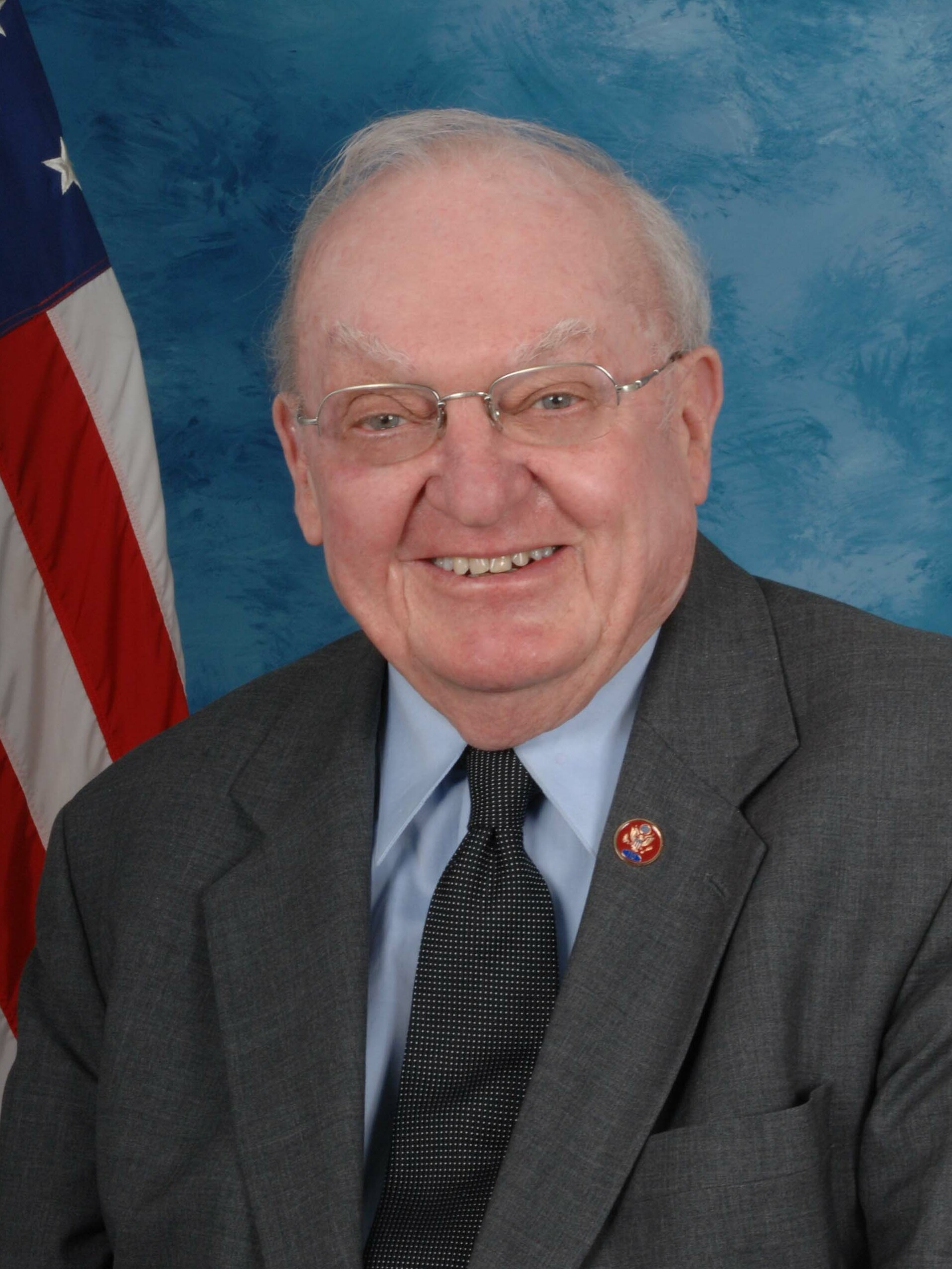

Nominee	Howard Coble	Jeffrey D. Bentley
Party	Republican	Libertarian
Popular vote	195,727	18,726
Percentage	91.0%	8.7%
- County results Coble: 80–90% 90–100%
U.S. Representative before election
Howard Coble
Republican
Elected U.S. Representative
Howard Coble
Republican

2000 United States House of Representatives North Carolina 6th District election
Party	Candidate	Votes	%	±%
Republican	Howard Coble (incumbent)	195,727	91.00	+2.36
Libertarian	Jeffrey D. Bentley	18,726	8.71	–2.66
Independent	Gene Gay	632	0.29	N/A
Turnout		215,085		

== District 7 ==
2000 North Carolina's 7th congressional district election
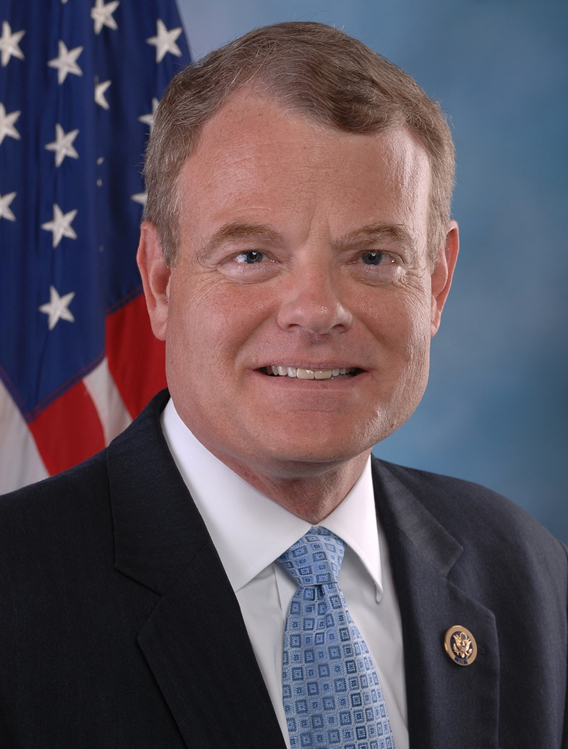

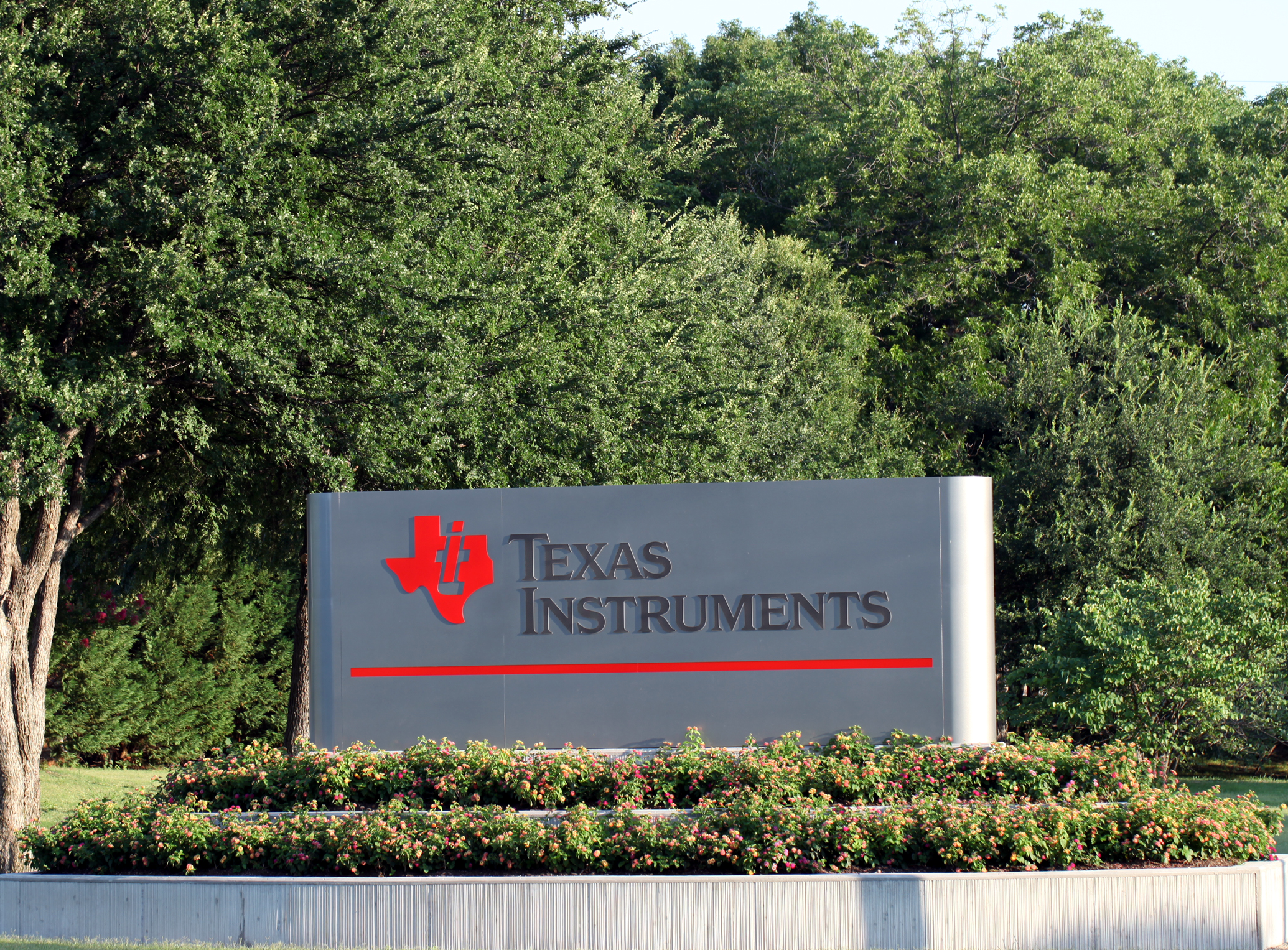
Nominee	Mike McIntyre	James R. Adams
Party	Democratic	Republican
Popular vote	160,185	66,463
Percentage	69.8%	28.9%
- County results Mcintyre: 50–60% 60–70% 80–90%
U.S. Representative before election
Mike McIntyre
Democratic
Elected U.S. Representative
Mike McIntyre
Democratic

2000 United States House of Representatives North Carolina 7th District election
Party	Candidate	Votes	%	±%
Democratic	Mike McIntyre (incumbent)	160,185	69.75	–21.50
Republican	James R. Adams	66,463	28.94	N/A
Libertarian	Bob Burns	3,018	1.31	–7.43
Turnout		229,666		

== District 8 ==
2000 North Carolina's 8th congressional district election
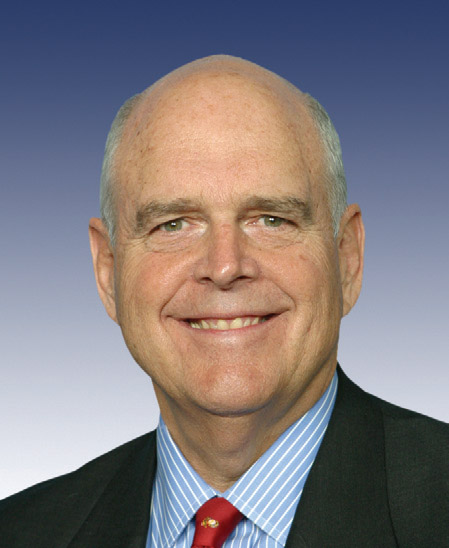

Nominee	Robin Hayes	Mike Taylor
Party	Republican	Democratic
Popular vote	111,950	89,505
Percentage	55.0%	44.0%
- County results Taylor: 40–50% 60–70% Hayes: 50–60% 60–70%
U.S. Representative before election
Robin Hayes
Republican
Elected U.S. Representative
Robin Hayes
Republican

2000 United States House of Representatives North Carolina 8th District election
Party	Candidate	Votes	%	±%
Republican	Robin Hayes (incumbent)	111,950	55.02	+4.31
Democratic	Mike Taylor	89,505	43.99	–4.18
Libertarian	Jack Schwartz	2,009	+0.99	–0.13
Turnout		203,464		

== District 9 ==
2000 North Carolina's 9th congressional district election
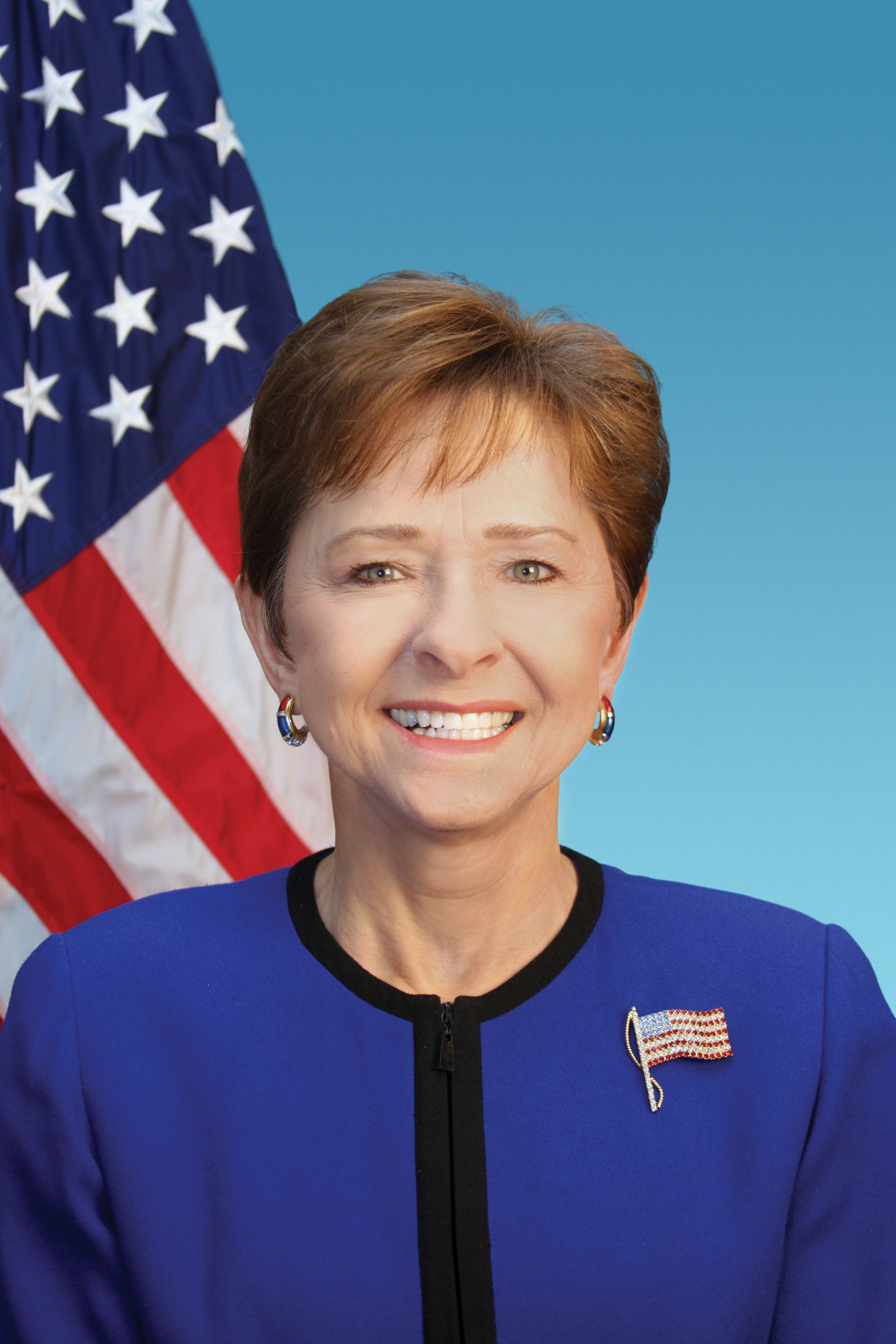

Nominee	Sue Wilkins Myrick	Ed McGuire
Party	Republican	Democratic
Popular vote	181,161	79,382
Percentage	68.9%	30.2%
- County results Myrick: 60–70% 70–80%
U.S. Representative before election
Sue Wilkins Myrick
Republican
Elected U.S. Representative
Sue Wilkins Myrick
Republican

2000 United States House of Representatives North Carolina 9th District election
Party	Candidate	Votes	%	±%
Republican	Sue Wilkins Myrick (incumbent)	181,161	68.88	–0.70
Democratic	Ed McGuire	79,382	30.18	+0.55
Libertarian	Christopher S. Cole	2,459	0.93	–0.31
Reform	James M. Cahaney	1,218	0.46	N/A
Turnout		264,220		

== District 10 ==
2000 North Carolina's 10th congressional district election
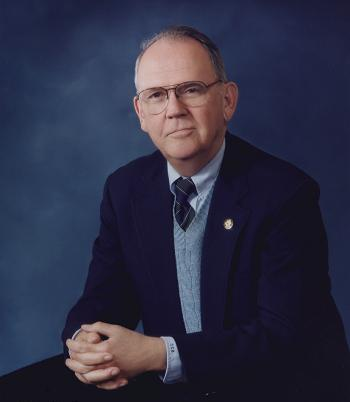

Nominee	Cass Ballenger	Delmas Parker
Party	Republican	Democratic
Popular vote	164,182	70,877
Percentage	68.2%	29.4%
- County results Ballenger: 50–60% 60–70% 70–80%
U.S. Representative before election
Cass Ballenger
Republican
Elected U.S. Representative
Cass Ballenger
Republican

2000 United States House of Representatives North Carolina 10th District election
Party	Candidate	Votes	%	±%
Republican	Cass Ballenger (incumbent)	164,182	68.22	–17.36
Democratic	Delmas Parker	70,877	29.45	N/A
Libertarian	Deborah Garrett Eddins	5,599	2.33	–12.09
Turnout		240,658		

== District 11 ==
2000 North Carolina's 11th congressional district election
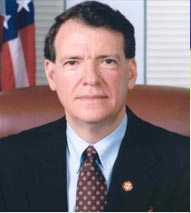

Nominee	Charles H. Taylor	Sam Neill
Party	Republican	Democratic
Popular vote	146,677	112,234
Percentage	55.1%	42.1%
- County results Taylor: 40–50% 50–60% 60–70% Neill: 40–50%
U.S. Representative before election
Charles H. Taylor
Republican
Elected U.S. Representative
Charles H. Taylor
Republican

2000 United States House of Representatives North Carolina 11th District election
Party	Candidate	Votes	%	±%
Republican	Charles H. Taylor (incumbent)	146,677	55.06	–1.55
Democratic	Sam Neill	112,234	42.13	–0.12
Libertarian	Charles Barry Williams	7,466	2.80	+1.67
Turnout		266,377		

== District 12 ==
2000 North Carolina's 12th congressional district election
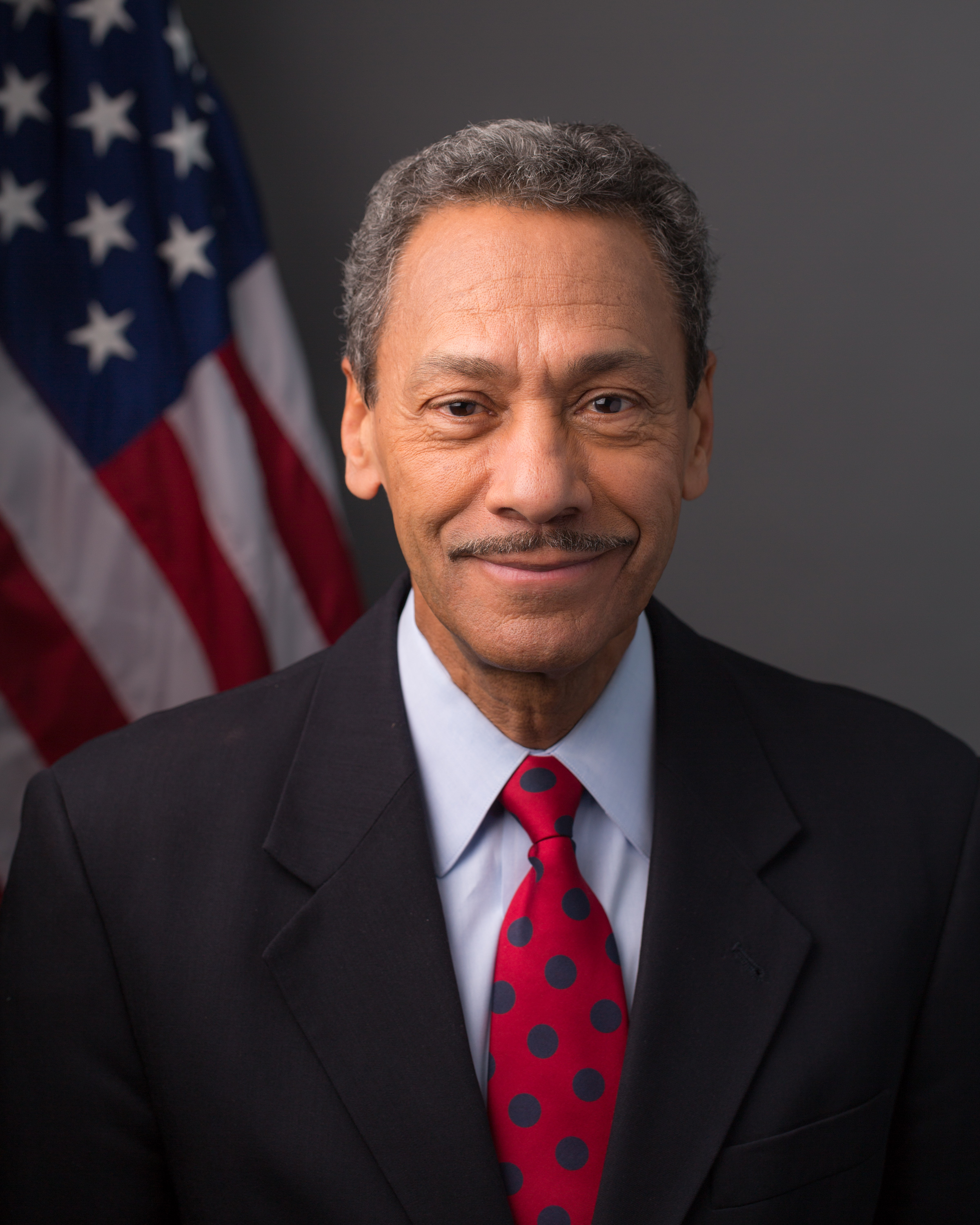

Nominee	Mel Watt	Chad Mitchell
Party	Democratic	Republican
Popular vote	135,570	69,596
Percentage	64.8%	33.3%
- County results Watt: 50–60% 60–70% 70–80% 80–90% Mitchell: 50–60% 60–70%
U.S. Representative before election
Mel Watt
Democratic
Elected U.S. Representative
Mel Watt
Democratic

2000 United States House of Representatives North Carolina 12th District election
Party	Candidate	Votes	%	±%
Democratic	Mel Watt (incumbent)	135,570	64.82	+8.87
Republican	Chad Mitchell	69,596	33.28	–8.92
Libertarian	Anna Lyon	3,978	1.90	+0.06
Turnout		209,144		

== See also ==
- 2000 North Carolina gubernatorial election
