= 1992 Michigan elections =

- November 3, 1992

The 1992 Michigan elections were held in the U.S. state of Michigan on November 3, 1992. The presidential primary was held on March 17. The state primary was held on August 4.

== Federal ==
=== Presidential primaries ===
The presidential primaries in Michigan were held on March 17, 1992. Bill Clinton won the Democratic primary. Incumbent president George H. W. Bush won the Republican primary. Both would win the nomination nationwide.

=== Presidential general election ===
Democratic nominee Bill Clinton won Michigan over incumbent Republican president George H. W. Bush. All 18 of Michigan's electoral votes went to Clinton. Clinton would also win the presidency nationally.

=== U.S. House of Representatives ===
Michigan lost 2 seats in the U.S. House of Representatives from the 1990 redistricting cycle. Before the election, the Democrats held an 11–7 majority in Michigan's U.S. House delegation over the Republicans. After the 1992 general election, the Democrats held a 10–6 majority.

== Legislature ==
=== House of Representative election ===
The 1992 state House election resulted in an even 55–55 split of Democrats and Republicans in the chamber.

== Judiciary ==
=== Supreme Court ===
There were two Michigan Supreme Court justices up for election on November 3, 1992. There was one full term to elect, as well as one partial term, ending on January 1, 1995. In December 1990, Conrad L. Mallett Jr. was appointed to the state supreme court by Governor James J. Blanchard following the resignation of Dennis Archer. Democrat Mallett won the partial term, and Republican incumbent Dorothy Comstock Riley was re-elected to the full term. This left the pre-existing partisan make up of 3 Republicans, 3 Democrats, and 1 independent on the court unchanged.

== Michigan State Board of Education and University boards ==
=== Michigan State Board of Education ===
Incumbent Republican Dorothy Beardmore sought re-election, while incumbent Republcian Cherry Jacobus did not. Beardmore and Democrat Kathleen N. Straus won election. This resulted in an even 4–4 split of Democrats and Republicans on the board.

=== Michigan State University Board of Trustees ===
Incumbent Republicans Dean M. Pridgeon and Melanie Reinhold sought re-election. They were defeated by Democrats Dorothy Gonzales and J. Bob Traxler. This resulted in a 5–3 Democratic majority on the board.

=== University of Michigan Board of Regents ===
Incumbent Republicans Neal Nielsen and Veronica Latta Smith sought re-election, however the Republicans chose Nancy Laro over Smith at their convention. Nielsen and Laro were defeated, and Democrats Laurence Deitch and Rebecca McGowan won. This resulted in a 6–2 Democratic majority on the board.

=== Wayne State University Board of Governors ===
Republicans Kevin Fobbs and incumbent George Bashara Jr. were defeated by Democrats Denise J. Lewis and Edgar A. Scribner. This resulted in a 6–2 Democratic majority on the board.

== Ballot initiatives ==
=== State ballot proposals ===
There were four state ballot proposals voted up in Michigan on November 3, 1992. Proposal A, which sought to limit homestead assessment increases in property tax, was rejected. Proposal B, which sought to implement term limits for various state officers, was approved. Proposal C, which sought to limit assessment increases in property tax more broadly, was rejected. Proposal D, which reform auto insurance, was rejected.
