= North Carolina's 12th congressional district =

U.S. House district for North Carolina

Coordinates: 35.35°N 80.75°W

- Interactive map of district boundaries since January 3, 2025 (Note: As the mid-decade redistricting bill (S249) enacted on October 22, 2025 only changed the compositions of North Carolina's 1st and 3rd congressional districts, boundaries of other districts will not change at the 2026 elections.)
- Representative: Alma Adams; D–Charlotte
- Population (2025): 801,009
- Median household income: $80,164
- Ethnicity: 36.5% Black; 35.9% White; 17.6% Hispanic; 5.7% Asian; 3.4% Two or more races; 1.0% other
- Cook PVI: D+24

North Carolina's 12th congressional district is a congressional district located mostly in Charlotte as well as surrounding areas in Mecklenburg County represented by Democrat Alma Adams. Prior to the 2016 elections, it was a gerrymandered district located in central North Carolina that comprised portions of Charlotte, Winston-Salem, Greensboro, Lexington, Salisbury, Concord, and High Point. With a Cook Partisan Voting Index of D+24, it is the most Democratic district in North Carolina, and it has never been represented by a Republican.

It was one of two minority-majority Congressional districts created in the state in the 1990s. Between 2003 and 2013, there was a small plurality of white Americans in the district according to the 2000 United States census, although African Americans made up a comparable proportion of the voting population. As redrawn for the 2012 elections and under the lines used prior to the 2016 elections, the district had an African-American majority according to the 2010 United States census.

North Carolina had a twelfth seat in the House in the early nineteenth century (1803–1843) and in the mid-twentieth century (1943–1963). Most of the territory in the district's second incarnation is now in the 11th district.

== History ==
The district was re-established after the 1990 United States census, when North Carolina gained a House seat due to an increase in population. It was drawn in 1992 as one of two minority-majority districts, designed to give African-American voters (who comprised 22% of the state's population at the time) the chance to elect a representative of their choice; Section 2 of the Voting Rights Act prohibited the dilution of voting power of minorities by distributing them among districts so that they could never elect candidates of their choice.

In its original configuration, the district had a 64 percent African-American majority in population. The district boundaries, stretching from Gastonia to Durham, were so narrow at some points that it was no wider than a highway lane. It followed Interstate 85 almost exactly. One state legislator famously remarked, after seeing the district map, "if you drove down the interstate with both car doors open, you'd kill most of the people in the district."

The United States Supreme Court ruled in Shaw v. Reno (1993) that a racial gerrymander may, in some circumstances, violate the Equal Protection Clause of the United States Constitution.

The state legislature defended the two minority-majority districts as based on demographics, with the 12th representing people of the interior Piedmont area and the 1st the Coastal Plain. Subsequently, the 12th district was redrawn several times and was adjudicated in the Supreme Court on two additional occasions. The version created after the 2000 census was approved by the U.S. Supreme Court in Hunt v. Cromartie. The district's configuration dating from the 2000 census had a small plurality of whites, and it was changed only slightly after the 2010 census. African Americans make up a large majority of registered voters and Hispanics constitute 7.1% of residents.

On February 5, 2016, U.S. Circuit Judge Roger L. Gregory ruled that the district, along with North Carolina's 1st congressional district, must be redrawn from its post-2010 configuration, and that race could not be a mitigating factor in drawing the district. This decision, in the case of Cooper v. Harris, was subsequently upheld 5−3 by the U.S. Supreme Court in an opinion by Justice Elena Kagan on May 22, 2017. In the opinion, Justice Kagan noted that this marked the fifth time the 12th district had appeared before the Supreme Court, following Shaw v. Reno and Hunt v. Cromartie which had both been heard twice before the Court.

In all of its configurations, it has been a Democratic stronghold. Its previous incarnation was dominated by black voters in Charlotte, Greensboro, and Winston-Salem. The redrawn map made the 12th a compact district comprising nearly all of Mecklenburg County, except the southeast quadrant. Due to Charlotte's heavy swing to the Democrats in recent years, the reconfigured 12th is no less Democratic than its predecessor.

On February 23, 2022, the North Carolina Supreme Court had approved a new map only used for the 2022 United States House of Representatives elections in North Carolina which had changed the 12th district boundaries to include the northern half of Mecklenburg County, including most of Uptown, along with eastern Cabarrus County.

On October 25, 2023, the North Carolina General Assembly redrew and approved a new congressional map for the 2024 election, and shifting the district to only Mecklenburg county.

== Counties and communities ==
For the 119th and successive Congresses (based on the districts drawn following a 2023 legislative session), the district contains all or portions of the following counties and communities.

Mecklenburg County (4)

Charlotte (part; also 8th and 14th), Matthews (part; also 8th), Mint Hill (part; also 8th), Pineville (part; also 14th)

== Recent election results from statewide races ==
| Year | Office | Results |
|---|---|---|
| 2008 | President | Obama 70% - 29% |
| 2008 | Senate | Hagan 69% - 28% |
| 2008 | Governor | Perdue 58% - 40% |
| 2010 | Senate | Marshall 62% - 36% |
| 2012 | President | Obama 71% - 29% |
| 2012 | Governor | Dalton 58% - 40% |
| 2014 | Senate | Hagan 69% - 28% |
| 2016 | President | Clinton 71% - 25% |
| 2016 | Senate | Ross 68% - 29% |
| 2016 | Governor | Cooper 71% - 27% |
| 2016 | Lt. Governor | Coleman 67% - 29% |
| 2016 | Secretary of State | Marshall 73% - 27% |
| 2016 | Auditor | Wood 71% - 29% |
| 2016 | Treasurer | Blue III 68% - 32% |
| 2016 | Attorney General | Stein 72% - 28% |
| 2020 | President | Biden 74% - 24% |
| 2020 | Senate | Cunningham 70% - 26% |
| 2020 | Governor | Cooper 75% - 23% |
| 2020 | Lt. Governor | Lewis Holley 73% - 27% |
| 2020 | Secretary of State | Marshall 75% - 25% |
| 2020 | Auditor | Wood 74% - 26% |
| 2020 | Treasurer | Chatterji 70% - 30% |
| 2020 | Attorney General | Stein 74% - 26% |
| 2022 | Senate | Beasley 73% - 25% |
| 2024 | President | Harris 72% - 26% |
| 2024 | Governor | Stein 77% - 18% |
| 2024 | Lt. Governor | Hunt 73% - 24% |
| 2024 | Secretary of State | Marshall 74% - 26% |
| 2024 | Auditor | Holmes 71% - 25% |
| 2024 | Treasurer | Harris 71% - 29% |
| 2024 | Attorney General | Jackson 76% - 24% |

== List of members representing the district ==
| Member (Residence) | Party | Years | Cong ress | Electoral history | District location |
|---|---|---|---|---|---|
District established March 4, 1803
| Joseph Winston (Surry County) | Democratic-Republican | March 4, 1803 – March 3, 1807 | 8th 9th | Elected in 1803. Re-elected in 1804. Retired. | 1803–1813 "North Carolina congressional district map (1803–13)". |
| Meshack Franklin (Scullcamp) | Democratic-Republican | March 4, 1807 – March 3, 1813 | 10th 11th 12th | Elected in 1806. Re-elected in 1808. Re-elected in 1810. Redistricted to the 13th district. | 1803–1813 "North Carolina congressional district map (1803–13)". |
| Meshack Franklin (Scullcamp) | Democratic-Republican | March 4, 1807 – March 3, 1813 | 10th 11th 12th | Elected in 1806. Re-elected in 1808. Re-elected in 1810. Redistricted to the 13th district. | 1813–1823 "North Carolina congressional district map (1813–43)". |
| Israel Pickens (Morgantown) | Democratic-Republican | March 4, 1813 – March 3, 1817 | 13th 14th | Redistricted from the 11th district and re-elected in 1813. Re-elected in 1815. Retired. | 1813–1823 "North Carolina congressional district map (1813–43)". |
| Felix Walker (Waynesville) | Democratic-Republican | March 4, 1817 – March 3, 1823 | 15th 16th 17th | Elected in 1817. Re-elected in 1819. Re-elected in 1821. Lost re-election. | 1813–1823 "North Carolina congressional district map (1813–43)". |
| Robert B. Vance (Nashville) | Democratic-Republican | March 4, 1823 – March 3, 1825 | 18th | Elected in 1823. Lost re-election. | 1823–1833 "North Carolina congressional district map (1813–43)". |
| Samuel P. Carson (Pleasant Garden) | Jacksonian | March 4, 1825 – March 3, 1833 | 19th 20th 21st 22nd | Elected in 1825. Re-elected in 1827. Re-elected in 1829. Re-elected in 1831. [data missing] | 1823–1833 "North Carolina congressional district map (1813–43)". |
| James Graham (Rutherfordton) | Anti-Jacksonian | March 4, 1833 – March 29, 1836 | 23rd 24th | Elected in 1833. Re-elected in 1835. Seat declared vacant. | 1833–1843 "North Carolina congressional district map (1813–43)". |
| Vacant | | March 29, 1836 – December 5, 1836 | 24th | | 1833–1843 "North Carolina congressional district map (1813–43)". |
| James Graham (Rutherfordton) | Anti-Jacksonian | December 5, 1836 – March 3, 1837 | 24th 25th 26th 27th | Elected in 1836 to finish his term. Also elected in 1837 to the next term. Re-elected in 1839. Re-elected in 1841. Redistricted to the 1st congressional district and lost re-election. | 1833–1843 "North Carolina congressional district map (1813–43)". |
| James Graham (Rutherfordton) | Whig | March 4, 1837 – March 3, 1843 | 24th 25th 26th 27th | Elected in 1836 to finish his term. Also elected in 1837 to the next term. Re-elected in 1839. Re-elected in 1841. Redistricted to the 1st congressional district and lost re-election. | 1833–1843 "North Carolina congressional district map (1813–43)". |
District dissolved March 4, 1843
District re-established January 3, 1943
| Zebulon Weaver (Asheville) | Democratic | January 3, 1943 – January 3, 1947 | 78th 79th | Redistricted from the 11th congressional district and re-elected in 1942. Re-elected in 1944. Lost renomination. | |
| Monroe M. Redden (Hendersonville) | Democratic | January 3, 1947 – January 3, 1953 | 80th 81st 82nd | Elected in 1946. Re-elected in 1948. Re-elected in 1950. Retired. | |
| George A. Shuford (Asheville) | Democratic | January 3, 1953 – January 3, 1959 | 83rd 84th 85th | Elected in 1952. Re-elected in 1954. Re-elected in 1956. Renominated but later withdrew because of ill health. | |
| David M. Hall (Sylva) | Democratic | January 3, 1959 – January 29, 1960 | 86th | Elected in 1958. Died. | |
| Vacant | | January 29, 1960 – June 25, 1960 | 86th | | |
| Roy A. Taylor (Black Mountain) | Democratic | June 25, 1960 – January 3, 1963 | 86th 87th | Elected to finish Hall's term. Re-elected in 1960. Redistricted to the 11th district. | |
District dissolved January 3, 1963
District re-established January 3, 1993
| Mel Watt (Charlotte) | Democratic | January 3, 1993 – January 6, 2014 | 103rd 104th 105th 106th 107th 108th 109th 110th 111th 112th 113th | Elected in 1992. Re-elected in 1994. Re-elected in 1996. Re-elected in 1998. Re-elected in 2000. Re-elected in 2002. Re-elected in 2004. Re-elected in 2006. Re-elected in 2008. Re-elected in 2010. Re-elected in 2012. Resigned to become director of the Federal Housing Finance Agency. | 1993–2003 [data missing] |
| Mel Watt (Charlotte) | Democratic | January 3, 1993 – January 6, 2014 | 103rd 104th 105th 106th 107th 108th 109th 110th 111th 112th 113th | Elected in 1992. Re-elected in 1994. Re-elected in 1996. Re-elected in 1998. Re-elected in 2000. Re-elected in 2002. Re-elected in 2004. Re-elected in 2006. Re-elected in 2008. Re-elected in 2010. Re-elected in 2012. Resigned to become director of the Federal Housing Finance Agency. | 2003–2013 2003–2013 |
| Mel Watt (Charlotte) | Democratic | January 3, 1993 – January 6, 2014 | 103rd 104th 105th 106th 107th 108th 109th 110th 111th 112th 113th | Elected in 1992. Re-elected in 1994. Re-elected in 1996. Re-elected in 1998. Re-elected in 2000. Re-elected in 2002. Re-elected in 2004. Re-elected in 2006. Re-elected in 2008. Re-elected in 2010. Re-elected in 2012. Resigned to become director of the Federal Housing Finance Agency. | 2013–2017 2013–2017 |
| Vacant | | January 6, 2014 – November 4, 2014 | 113th | | 2013–2017 2013–2017 |
| Alma Adams (Charlotte) | Democratic | November 4, 2014 – present | 113th 114th 115th 116th 117th 118th 119th | Elected to finish Watt's term. Elected to full term in 2014. Re-elected in 2016. Re-elected in 2018. Re-elected in 2020. Re-elected in 2022. Re-elected in 2024. Re-elected in 2026. | 2013–2017 2013–2017 |
| Alma Adams (Charlotte) | Democratic | November 4, 2014 – present | 113th 114th 115th 116th 117th 118th 119th | Elected to finish Watt's term. Elected to full term in 2014. Re-elected in 2016. Re-elected in 2018. Re-elected in 2020. Re-elected in 2022. Re-elected in 2024. Re-elected in 2026. | 2017–2021 |
| Alma Adams (Charlotte) | Democratic | November 4, 2014 – present | 113th 114th 115th 116th 117th 118th 119th | Elected to finish Watt's term. Elected to full term in 2014. Re-elected in 2016. Re-elected in 2018. Re-elected in 2020. Re-elected in 2022. Re-elected in 2024. Re-elected in 2026. | 2021–2023 Static map of 2020-3 congressional district |
| Alma Adams (Charlotte) | Democratic | November 4, 2014 – present | 113th 114th 115th 116th 117th 118th 119th | Elected to finish Watt's term. Elected to full term in 2014. Re-elected in 2016. Re-elected in 2018. Re-elected in 2020. Re-elected in 2022. Re-elected in 2024. Re-elected in 2026. | 2023–2025 |
| Alma Adams (Charlotte) | Democratic | November 4, 2014 – present | 113th 114th 115th 116th 117th 118th 119th | Elected to finish Watt's term. Elected to full term in 2014. Re-elected in 2016. Re-elected in 2018. Re-elected in 2020. Re-elected in 2022. Re-elected in 2024. Re-elected in 2026. | 2025–present |

== Past election results ==
=== 2002 ===
2002 North Carolina's 12th congressional district election
| Party | Candidate | Votes | % |
|---|---|---|---|
| Democratic | Mel Watt (incumbent) | 98,821 | 65.34 |
| Republican | Jeff Kish | 49,588 | 32.79 |
| Libertarian | Carey Head | 2,830 | 1.87 |
| Turnout | | 151,239 | 100.00 |
| Democratic hold | | | |

=== 2004 ===
2004 North Carolina's 12th congressional district election
| Party | Candidate | Votes | % |
|---|---|---|---|
| Democratic | Mel Watt (incumbent) | 154,908 | 66.83 |
| Republican | Ada Fisher | 76,898 | 33.17 |
| Turnout | | 231,806 | 100.00 |
| Democratic hold | | | |

=== 2006 ===
2006 North Carolina's 12th congressional district election
| Party | Candidate | Votes | % |
|---|---|---|---|
| Democratic | Mel Watt (incumbent) | 71,345 | 67.01 |
| Republican | Ada Fisher | 35,127 | 32.99 |
| Turnout | | 106,472 | 100.00 |
| Democratic hold | | | |

=== 2008 ===
2008 North Carolina's 12th congressional district election
| Party | Candidate | Votes | % |
|---|---|---|---|
| Democratic | Mel Watt (incumbent) | 215,908 | 71.56 |
| Republican | Ty Cobb, Jr. | 85,814 | 28.44 |
| Turnout | | 301,722 | 100.00 |
| Democratic hold | | | |

=== 2010 ===
2010 North Carolina's 12th congressional district election
| Party | Candidate | Votes | % |
|---|---|---|---|
| Democratic | Mel Watt (incumbent) | 103,495 | 63.88 |
| Republican | Greg Dority | 55,315 | 34.14 |
| Libertarian | Lon Cecil | 3,197 | 1.97 |
| Total votes | | 162,007 | 100.00 |
| Democratic hold | | | |

=== 2012 ===
2012 North Carolina's 12th congressional district election
| Party | Candidate | Votes | % |
|---|---|---|---|
| Democratic | Melvin Watt (incumbent) | 247,591 | 79.6 |
| Republican | Jack Brosch | 63,317 | 20.4 |
| Total votes | | 310,908 | 100.0 |
| Democratic hold | | | |

=== 2014 special election ===
2014 North Carolina's 12th congressional district special election
| Party | Candidate | Votes | % |
|---|---|---|---|
| Democratic | Alma Adams | 127,668 | 75.43% |
| Republican | Vince Coakley | 41,578 | 24.57% |
| Total votes | | 169,246 | 100.0% |
| Democratic hold | | | |

=== 2014 ===
2014 North Carolina's 12th congressional district election
| Party | Candidate | Votes | % |
|---|---|---|---|
| Democratic | Alma Adams | 130,096 | 75.4 |
| Republican | Vince Coakley | 42,568 | 24.6 |
| Total votes | | 172,664 | 100.0 |
| Democratic hold | | | |

=== 2016 ===
2016 North Carolina's 12th congressional district election
| Party | Candidate | Votes | % |
|---|---|---|---|
| Democratic | Alma Adams (incumbent) | 234,115 | 67.0 |
| Republican | Leon Threatt | 115,185 | 33.0 |
| Total votes | | 349,300 | 100.0 |
| Democratic hold | | | |

=== 2018 ===
2018 North Carolina's 12th congressional district election
| Party | Candidate | Votes | % |
|---|---|---|---|
| Democratic | Alma Adams (incumbent) | 203,974 | 73.1 |
| Republican | Paul Wright | 75,164 | 26.9 |
| Total votes | | 279,138 | 100.0 |
| Democratic hold | | | |

=== 2020 ===
2020 North Carolina's 12th congressional district election
| Party | Candidate | Votes | % |
|---|---|---|---|
| Democratic | Alma Adams (incumbent) | 341,457 | 100.0 |
| Total votes | | 341,457 | 100.0 |
| Democratic hold | | | |

=== 2022 ===
2022 North Carolina's 12th congressional district election
| Party | Candidate | Votes | % |
|---|---|---|---|
| Democratic | Alma Adams (incumbent) | 140,494 | 62.75 |
| Republican | Tyler Lee | 83,414 | 37.25 |
| Total votes | | 223,908 | 100.00 |
| Democratic hold | | | |

=== 2024 ===
2024 North Carolina's 12th congressional district election
| Party | Candidate | Votes | % |
|---|---|---|---|
| Democratic | Alma Adams (incumbent) | 259,627 | 74.0 |
| Republican | Addul Ali | 91,128 | 26.0 |
| Total votes | | 350,755 | 100.0 |
| Democratic hold | | | |

== See also ==
- List of United States congressional districts
- North Carolina's congressional districts

== Works cited ==
- Martis, Kenneth C. (1989). The Historical Atlas of Political Parties in the United States Congress. New York: Macmillan Publishing Company.
- Martis, Kenneth C. (1982). The Historical Atlas of United States Congressional Districts. New York: Macmillan Publishing Company.
- Congressional Biographical Directory of the United States 1774–present
