= Miller v. Johnson =

1995 US Supreme Court gerrymandering case

- Supreme Court of the United States

Argued April 19, 1995 Decided June 29, 1995
- Full case name: Zell Miller v. Davida Johnson
- Citations: 515 U.S. 900 (more) 115 S. Ct. 2475; 132 L. Ed. 2d 762; 1995 U.S. LEXIS 4462

Case history
- Prior: On appeal from U.S. District Court for the Southern District of Georgia. Together with No. 94-797, Abrams et al. v. Johnson et al., and No. 94-929, United States v. Johnson et al., also on appeal from the same court.

Questions presented
- Does a Shaw claim require proof that a district shape is so bizarre that it is "unexplainable other than on the basis of race"?

Holding
- No, Georgia's congressional redistricting plan violates the Equal Protection Clause.

Court membership
- Chief Justice William Rehnquist Associate Justices John P. Stevens · Sandra Day O'Connor; Antonin Scalia · Anthony Kennedy; David Souter · Clarence Thomas; Ruth Bader Ginsburg · Stephen Breyer

Case opinions
- Majority: Kennedy, joined by Rehnquist, O'Connor, Scalia, Thomas
- Concurrence: O'Connor
- Dissent: Stevens
- Dissent: Ginsburg, joined by Stevens, Breyer, Souter (except as to Part III-B)

Laws applied
- U.S. Const. amend. XIV

Miller v. Johnson, 515 U.S. 900 (1995), was a United States Supreme Court case concerning the constitutionality of racial gerrymandering in which the Court held that "direct evidence" of legislative purpose could demonstrate a racial motive supporting a claim under Shaw v. Reno.

== Background ==
In 1993 the United States Supreme Court ruled that redistricting that separated voters based on race and could not be explained by traditional districting criteria could be challenged. Laws that classify by race, including those that appear neutral but can only be explained by race, can be upheld if they serve a compelling state interest and are narrowly tailored to serve that interest. These equal protection principles apply to the drawing of congressional districts.

Since 1965, Georgia had been subject to preclearance requirements under the Voting Rights Act to protect the Fifteenth Amendment rights of voters in that state. Georgia had ten congressional districts after the 1980 census; one of those districts was a majority-black district. According to the 1990 census, Georgia's increase in population entitled the state to an eleventh congressional seat. After the Justice Department denied several of the Assembly's proposed new districts, which placed non-black minority voters in a majority-black district, and did not maximize the number of majority-black districts, the Assembly drew the Eleventh District to create three majority-black districts. The Justice Department gave its approval and elections took place in November 1992 under the new plan. All three majority-black districts elected black candidates.

However, the district lacked any sort of organic structure, and was deemed a "[geographic] monstrosity" because it extended approximately 260 square miles from Atlanta to the Atlantic Ocean. In 1994, white voters in the Eleventh Congressional District of the state of Georgia filed a lawsuit challenging the Eleventh District as a racial gerrymander. Applying Shaw v. Reno, the district court found that the redistricting plan was not narrowly tailored to comply with the Voting Rights Act.

== Question before the Supreme Court ==
Does a Shaw claim require that a district's shape be “so bizarre that it is unexplainable other than on the basis of race”?

== Decision of the Court ==
Justice Kennedy wrote the majority opinion for the Court. Ruling against the district, the Court declared the district unconstitutional under the Equal Protection Clause of the Fourteenth Amendment, explaining that a successful Shaw v. Reno claim could be proved with direct or circumstantial evidence:

Shape is relevant not because bizarreness is a necessary element of the constitutional wrong or a threshold requirement of proof, but because it may be persuasive circumstantial evidence that race for its own sake, and not other districting principles, was the legislature's dominant and controlling rationale in drawing its district lines.

The state did not dispute the district court's factual finding that race was the "predominant, overriding factor" motivating the drawing of district lines but argued that "direct evidence" of legislative purpose could not prove a Shaw claim.

Although Shaw v. Reno held that "in some exceptional cases a reapportionment plan may be so highly irregular and bizarre in shape that it rationally cannot be understood as anything other than an effort to segregate voters based on race", the Court said that district shape alone is often not enough to prove a racial motive, and direct evidence can be considered.

Finding adequate support for the district court's conclusion that race was the "predominant, overriding factor", the Court next considered whether the plan was narrowly tailored to comply with the Voting Rights Act. However, because the Justice Department policy was not related to preventing an invidious practice like those contemplated by Section 5 the Court ruled that the plan was not narrowly tailored for compliance with the Voting Rights Act.

Justice Sandra Day O'Connor wrote a concurrence, while Justice Ruth Bader Ginsburg wrote a dissent joined by Justices John Paul Stevens, Stephen G. Breyer, and David H. Souter. Stevens wrote an additional, separate dissent joined by no other justice.

== See also ==
- Wesberry v. Sanders, 376 U.S. 1 (1964): Earlier Georgia congressional redistricting case
- Wright v. Rockefeller, 376 U.S. 52 (1964)
- Shaw v. Reno, 509 U.S. 630 (1993)
- Bush v. Vera, 517 U.S. 952 (1996)
- Hunt v. Cromartie, 526 U.S. 541 (1999)
- Easley v. Cromartie, 532 U.S. 234 (2001)
- Georgia v. Ashcroft, 539 U.S. 461 (2003): Georgia State Senate redistricting case
- League of United Latin American Citizens v. Perry, 548 U.S. 399 (2006)
- Alabama Legislative Black Caucus v. Alabama, 575 U.S. ___ (2015)
- List of United States Supreme Court cases, volume 515
- Briffault, Richard "Race and Representation after Miller v. Johnson" University of Chicago Legal Forum, vol. 1995, issue 1, article 3
