= Presley v. Etowah County Commission =

Presley v Etowah County Commission
- Supreme Court of the United States

Argued November 12, 1991 Decided January 27, 1992
- Full case name: Lawrence C. Presley, etc., Appellant, v. Etowah County et al. Ed Peter Mack and Nathaniel Gosha, III, etc., Appellants, v. Russell County Commission et al
- Citations: 502 U.S. 491 (more) 112 S. Ct. 820; 117 L. Ed. 2d 51

Case history
- Prior: Jurisdictional Statement for the Appellant at A-I, Presley v. Etowah County Comm'n M.D. Ala.

Holding
- Neither the Common Fund Resolution nor adoption of the Unit System was a change "with respect to voting" covered by § 5. Pp. 827-832.

Court membership
- Chief Justice William Rehnquist Associate Justices Byron White · Harry Blackmun; John P. Stevens · Sandra Day O'Connor; Antonin Scalia · Anthony Kennedy; David Souter · Clarence Thomas

Case opinions
- Majority: Kennedy, joined by Rehnquist, O'Connor, Scalia, Souter, Thomas
- Dissent: Stevens, joined by White, Blackmun

Laws applied
- Voting Rights Act of 1965

Presley v. Etowah County Commission, 502 U.S. 491 (1992), was a United States Supreme Court voting rights case where the Court held by a 6—3 majority that the abolition of road districts did not violate the Fifteenth Amendment or the Voting Rights Act of 1965.

== Background ==
The case arose as a result of efforts by Alabama's Etowah County to restructure its roads board beginning in 1986. Between 1964 and the restructuring, members of Etowah County's roads board were elected at-large, but from 1986 onwards the county changed the structure of its roads board to six single-member districts. In 1987, the majority-white commission voted to have all the money put in a common fund rather than in separate districts as originally intended.

Lawrence Presley, a newly elected black member, argued to the United States District Court for the Middle District of Alabama that the changes in the distribution of authority were a form of racial discrimination and a violation of section 5 of the Voting Rights Act of 1965 which permits Alabama's government to alter practices related to voting only after receiving judicial preclearance. Presley would be joined by the first two black members from neighbouring Russell County, Nathaniel Gosha, III, and Ed Peter Mack, who had been challenging a case relating to transferring authority from county road projects directly to the county engineer.

The District Court would rule that the change from at-large to district election for members of Etowah County's roads board did not violate the preclearance requirements of the Voting Rights Act. Presley would appeal directly to the Supreme Court in 1991, and the case would be heard on November 12 that year.

== Ruling ==
=== Majority ===
In a majority opinion by Justice Anthony Kennedy, the Supreme Court would uphold the District Court's ruling that there was no violation of the Voting Rights Act. Justice Kennedy argued that the changes in structure of the roads board in the two Alabama counties did not alter the power of the officials and was therefore not subject to Section 5 preclearance. Whilst Justice Kennedy accepted that all changes in voting regulations were subject to preclearance because of Alabama's extensive history of discrimination, he argued that the changes made were related purely to the internal operation of an elected body and hence not subject to the preclearance requirements. The majority opinion also argued that

states must be allowed both predictability and efficiency in structuring their governments.

=== Dissent ===
Justice John Paul Stevens wrote a dissent, which was signed onto by Byron White and Harry Blackmun. Stevens argued that reversing the District Court's decision would be no burden on either Alabama county, that before this case federal courts had uniformly agreed that the Voting Rights Act was to be interpreted stringently, and that on at least eight occasions since Stevens joined the Supreme Court. (Note: Stevens joined the Court in November 1975 (1975/1976 Supreme Court term) to replace the retiring William Orville Douglas.) Stevens also argued that all changes in the power of state and local offices in covered states like Alabama were subject to preclearance according to Allen v. State Board of Elections, 393 U.S. 544 and Dougherty County Board of Education v. White, 439 U.S. 32.

== Legacy ==
At the time it was decided, Presley v. Etowah County Commission was viewed as a major shift in voting rights jurisprudence from the Warren and Burger Courts. Many critics also argued that the Justices in their writing were more concerned about the protection of black officeholders’ power than with the rights of ordinary black voters.

Some twenty-first century analysts have said Presley has proved an influential case in the virtual gutting of the Voting Rights Act by the Roberts Court.

== See also ==
- List of United States Supreme Court cases, volume 502
