= Wright v. Rockefeller =

1964 US Supreme Court gerrymandering case

- Supreme Court of the United States

Argued November 19, 1963 Decided February 17, 1964
- Full case name: Wright et al. v. Rockefeller, Governor of New York, et al.
- Citations: 376 U.S. 52 (more) 84 S. Ct. 603; 11 L. Ed. 2d 512; 1964 U.S. LEXIS 1774

Case history
- Prior: Judgment for defendants, injunction denied 211 F. Supp. 460 (S.D.N.Y. 1962)

Holding
- A New York statute that delineated the boundaries of the congressional district in Manhattan Island did not segregate eligible voters by race and place of origin in violation of the Equal Protection and Due Process Clauses of the Fourteenth Amendment and in violation of the Fifteenth Amendment. Judgment of the U.S. District Court for the Southern District of New York affirmed.

Court membership
- Chief Justice Earl Warren Associate Justices Hugo Black · William O. Douglas; Tom C. Clark · John M. Harlan II; William J. Brennan Jr. · Potter Stewart; Byron White · Arthur Goldberg

Case opinions
- Majority: Black, joined by Warren, Clark, Harlan, Brennan, Stewart, White
- Concurrence: Harlan
- Dissent: Douglas, joined by Goldberg
- Dissent: Goldberg, joined by Douglas

Laws applied
- U.S. Const. Amend. XIV; U.S. Const. Amend. XV; N.Y. State Law § 111.

Wright v. Rockefeller, 376 U.S. 52 (1964), was a case in which the Supreme Court of the United States held that evidence of racial consideration cannot be elevated to prima facie proof when several plausible conflicting inferences that could be drawn from that evidence were "equally or more persuasive".

== Background ==
Appellants, a group of citizens and registered voters in the Seventeenth, Eighteenth, Nineteenth, and Twentieth Congressional Districts in Manhattan brought suit against New York state officials, including then Governor Nelson Rockefeller, in the United States District Court for the Southern District of New York challenging the constitutionality of the portion of New York's 1961 congressional apportionment statute which defined the four districts. The District Court permitted Congressman Adam Clayton Powell, who represented the Eighteenth District, along with several other New York County officials, to intervene as defendants supporting the constitutionality of the statute. The appellants claimed that apportionment statute deprived them of rights guaranteed by the Due Process and Equal protection portions of the Fourteenth Amendment and by the Fifteenth Amendment, which prohibits the government from denying or abridging the right to vote on account of race, color, or previous condition of servitude. Specifically, appellants claimed that the statute "establish[ed] irrational, discriminatory and unequal Congressional Districts in the County of New York and segregat[ed] eligible voters by race and place of origin."

The case was heard by a three judge panel of the District Court. Appellants presented maps, statistics, and other evidence demonstrating that African-Americans and Puerto Ricans comprised 86.3 per cent of the Eighteenth District, 28.5 per cent of the Nineteenth District, 27.5 per cent of the Twentieth District, but only 5.1 per cent of the Seventeenth District. A majority of the District Court panel found that appellants had not shown any proof that the boundaries were drawn on racial lines or motivated by racial considerations. One judge, concurring, said plaintiffs had "not met their burden of proving that the boundaries...were drawn along racial lines". One judge dissented, viewing the evidence as "tantamount for all practical purposes, to a mathematical demonstration" that the legislation was "solely concerned with segregating" white voters from non-whites.

== Court's Decision ==
Four justices wrote opinions in this case. Justice Black wrote for the majority, and was joined by 6 other justices, including Justice Harlan, who also wrote a concurring opinion. Justices Douglas and Goldberg each wrote dissenting opinions, and each joined the others opinion.

=== The majority decision ===
The Court began with a recitation of the relevant factual and procedural background, and then turned to first question presented in the statement, whether "appellants sustained their burden of providing that the portion of [the statute] which delineates the boundaries of the Congressional districts in Manhattan Island segregates eligible voters by race and place of origin in violation [of the Constitution]." The Court agreed with the findings of the District Court that the "appellants failed to prove that the New York Legislature was either motivated by racial considerations or in fact drew the districts on racial lines".

The Court held that evidence of racial motive does not automatically shift the burden of proof to the state when several plausible conflicting inferences are "equally or more persuasive":

It may be true ... that there was evidence which could have supported inferences that racial considerations might have moved the state legislature, but, even if so, we agree that there also was evidence to support [the] finding that the contrary inference was "equally, or more, persuasive." Where there are such conflicting inferences one group of them cannot, because labeled as "prima facie proof," be treated as conclusive on the fact finder so as to deprive him of his responsibility to choose among disputed inferences.

The Court agreed with the District Court finding that appellants did not meet their burden of proving that the statute was "the product of a state contrivance to segregate on the basis of race or place of origin," and therefore upheld the District Court's decision.

=== Harlan's concurring opinion ===
Justice Harlan joined the opinion of the Court, but wrote separately, in a paragraph long concurrence, to comment that he believed that this case was governed by entirely different principles than in Wesberry v. Sanders, a case that had also been decided that day.

=== Douglas' dissenting opinion ===
Justice Douglas dissented, arguing that the case raised a similar question to the issue raised in Gomillion v. Lightfoot, where racial gerrymandering was used to deprive African Americans on the right to vote. Douglas argued that though the right to vote was not being deprived, the redistricting was concentrating minority voters in particular districts and excluding them from others.

Douglas recited the relevant facts, and concluded that "[t]he record strongly suggests that these twists and turns producing an 11-sided, step-shaped boundary between the Seventeenth and Eighteenth Districts were made to bring into the Eighteenth District and keep out of the Seventeenth as many Negroes and Puerto Ricans as possible." Although he admitted that the District Court had not made such a finding, Justice Douglas concluded that, absent any rebuttal or challenge by the State, the only inference that could be drawn from the facts was that it was "not possible to say 'that race is irrelevant to districting.'"

Douglas next addressed the argument advanced by the intervening parties that the districting plan was beneficial to minorities, because it allowed minority politicians an advantage in heavily minority districts. Douglas rejected this argument, referring to it as the theory of "separate but better off," and writing "[t]he fact that Negro political leaders find advantage in this nearly solid Negro and Puerto Rican district is irrelevant to our problem. Rotten boroughs were long a curse of democratic processes. Racial boroughs are also at war with democratic standards."

Finally, Douglas compared the situation in the Manhattan districts to the Electoral Register System that the British instituted in India, and was also used in Lebanon. Under that system, constituencies were separated by religion. Douglas wrote that "Racial electoral registers, like religious ones, have no place in a society that honors the Lincoln tradition — 'of the people, by the people, for the people.'" Such a system, Douglas argued, "is a divisive force in a community, emphasizing differences between candidates and voters that are irrelevant in the constitutional sense."

=== Goldberg's dissenting opinion ===
Justice Goldberg wrote a separate dissent, arguing that the appellants had satisfied their burden of establishing that district boundaries had been purposefully drawn on racial lines. Goldberg rejected the conclusion that the District Court had found to the contrary. The decision from the three-judge District Court contained a separate opinion for each, therefore, Goldberg argued that the District Court had made no findings of fact at all. He then went on to discuss and criticize the constitutional standards applied by each of the District Court judges. In this light, he argued that the majority’s grounds for their decision, i.e., accepting the findings and constitutional standards of the District Court, was meaningless and an abdication of the Supreme Court’s responsibilities. Goldberg further stated that the appellants had made sufficient showings of racially discriminatory intent in the redistricting plan to pursue their case.

== See also ==
- List of United States Supreme Court cases, volume 376
- Shaw v. Reno
