= Shaw v. Hunt =

- Supreme Court of the United States

Argued December 5, 1995 Decided June 13, 1996
- Full case name: Shaw et al. v. Hunt, Governor of North Carolina, et al.
- Docket no.: 94-923
- Citations: 517 U.S. 899 (more)
- Argument: Oral argument

Court membership
- Chief Justice William Rehnquist Associate Justices John P. Stevens · Sandra Day O'Connor; Antonin Scalia · Anthony Kennedy; David Souter · Clarence Thomas; Ruth Bader Ginsburg · Stephen Breyer

Case opinions
- Majority: Rehnquist, joined by O'Connor, Scalia, Kennedy, Thomas
- Dissent: Justice Stevens, joined by Ginsburg, Breyer (Parts II, III, IV, and V)
- Dissent: Souter, joined by Ginsburg, Breyer

Shaw v. Hunt, 517 U.S. 899 (1996), was a United States Supreme Court case concerning redistricting and racial gerrymandering. This case and its predecessor, Shaw v. Reno, concerned North Carolina's congressional redistricting plans. The Court ruled in Shaw v. Hunt that the redistricting plan violated the Equal Protection Clause of the Fourteenth Amendment.

== Background ==
=== North Carolina's majority-black districts ===
After the 1990 census North Carolina gained a seat in the House of Representatives and state redistricting officials redrew district boundaries, as they are required to do once every ten years, to preserve an equal population distribution across districts. However, because of North Carolina's extensively documented history of denying minority voting rights, Congress mandated that "preclearance" was required before the state could make any changes to its election procedures. The Justice Department said the proposed redistricting plan (with only one majority-black district) did not "give effect to black and Native American voting strength" so North Carolina added a second majority-black district strict to comply with the Justice Department's interpretation of the Voting Rights Act of 1965. In Miller v. Johnson the Supreme Court ruled that the Justice Department was reading Section 5 of the Act too broadly.

Meanwhile, the state argued that the white plaintiffs did not have standing to continue this lawsuit. In United States v. Hays the Supreme Court confirmed that plaintiffs could show standing if they were personally subjected to a racial classification, which limited the ongoing Shaw litigation to the district in which the plaintiffs resided.

== Decision ==
In a 5–4 decision delivered by Justice William Rehnquist, the Court held that the redistricting plan violated the Equal Protection Clause and invalidated the district. The Court applied strict scrutiny to the plan, concluding that it was not narrowly tailored to serve a compelling state interest. The Court found that none of the three compelling interests identified by the State was sufficient to survive strict scrutiny.

For the first stated "interest in eradicating the effects of past discrimination," the Court found no evidence; remedying the effects of past or present discrimination may be a compelling interest only if the state has a "strong basis in evidence" for concluding that remedial action is required. The Court stressed that identifying the "scope of the injury" is necessary to fashion a remedy "to restore the victims of discriminatory conduct to the position they would have occupied in the absence of such conduct" (quoting Milliken v. Bradley).

For the second claimed interest of complying with Section 5 of the Voting Rights Act, the Court found that under a correct reading of the section, creating an additional majority-minority district was not required; for the third interest of avoiding liability under Section 2 of the Voting Rights Act, which prohibited dilution of minorities' voting strength, the Court found that the redistricting plan would not be able to remedy any such violation. The Court emphasized that compliance with the Voting Rights Act can not be a compelling state interest if the Act does not require the district to be drawn as such. Finding the districts were not narrowly tailored for compliance with the Act the Court again left open the question of whether compliance was a compelling state interest.

=== Dissent ===
Justice Stevens was joined in dissent by Ruth Bader Ginsburg and Stephen Breyer:

I am convinced that the Court's aggressive supervision of state action designed to accommodate the political concerns of historically disadvantaged minority groups is seriously misguided. A majority's attempt to enable the minority to participate more effectively in the process of democratic government should not be viewed with the same hostility that is appropriate for oppressive and exclusionary abuses of political power.

== Subsequent developments ==
In 1997 the state redrew the district boundaries but the district court ruled against this in 1998. The next attempt to redraw the district was only 35% African-American. While the incumbent African-American candidate won the 1998 election despite redistricting, the effects of Shaw I and Shaw II are nearly impossible to pin down because alternate explanations exist like incumbency advantage. The case was revisited in Hunt v. Cromartie which reinstated the 1997 map after deciding it had been a partisan gerrymander to protect the incumbent. After the district Court reheard the case and invalidated the map again, this time on the merits, they were reversed a fourth time by the Supreme Court in Easley v. Cromartie.

Bush v. Vera was decided on the same day striking down three majority-minority districts in Texas.

== See also ==
- Shaw v. Reno
- Voting Rights Act of 1965
