= Alabama Legislative Black Caucus v. Alabama =

- Supreme Court of the United States

Argued November 12, 2014 Decided March 25, 2015
- Full case name: Alabama Legislative Black Caucus, et al., Appellants v. Alabama, et al.; Alabama Democratic Conference, et al., Appellants v. Alabama, et al.
- Citations: 575 U.S. 254 (more) 135 S. Ct. 1257; 191 L. Ed. 2d 314

Case history
- Prior: 989 F. Supp. 2d 1227 (M.D. Ala. 2013); probable jurisdiction noted, 572 U.S. 1149 (2014).

Holding
- The district court committed various legal errors, including the analysis of the racial gerrymandering claim as referring to the State "as a whole," rather than district-by-district.

Court membership
- Chief Justice John Roberts Associate Justices Antonin Scalia · Anthony Kennedy; Clarence Thomas · Ruth Bader Ginsburg; Stephen Breyer · Samuel Alito; Sonia Sotomayor · Elena Kagan

Case opinions
- Majority: Breyer, joined by Kennedy, Ginsburg, Sotomayor, Kagan
- Dissent: Scalia, joined by Roberts, Thomas, Alito
- Dissent: Thomas

Alabama Legislative Black Caucus v. Alabama, 575 U.S. 254 (2015), was a U.S. Supreme Court decision that overturned a previous decision by a federal district court upholding Alabama's 2012 redrawing of its electoral districts.

== Background ==
Following the 2010 census, Alabama's Republican-controlled legislature redrew state legislative district lines. The new plan maintained the same number of majority-minority Senate districts and added one more majority-minority House district. The existing African-American majority districts had lost population and new voters needed to be added to those districts, therefore the new plans focused on adding African-American voters to those districts to keep the same proportion of minority voters in each district. The Alabama Legislative Black Caucus and Alabama Democratic Conference challenged this on the grounds that it was an illegal racial gerrymander, banned under the Equal Protection Clause of the Fourteenth Amendment. The state said it was necessary to comply with Section 5 of the Voting Rights Act.

The case went before a three-judge panel in federal district court. The panel characterized the arguments of the Caucus and the Conference as challenging the Alabama redistricting as a whole, with the Conference additionally challenging four specific Senate districts: 7, 11, 22, and 26.

The panel held that the Caucus had standing for its claim, but dismissed the Conference's claims regarding both the state as a whole and the four districts. The Court further held that race was not the predominant factor for the redistricting as a whole or for the four districts because "the main priority of the Legislature was to comply with the constitutional mandate of one person, one vote". Finally, the panel held that, even if it was wrong and race was the predominant factor for the redistricting, the districts should still survive strict scrutiny because the act creating them was narrowly tailored to achieve the compelling state interest of complying with the VRA.

== Supreme Court ==
The Supreme Court, in a 5-4 opinion written by Justice Stephen Breyer, vacated the holdings of the District Court and remanded the case for further consideration in line with the decision:

1. Racial gerrymandering claims must be considered district-by-district, rather than by looking at the state "as a whole". The court may consider statewide evidence in evaluating these claims, but the complaint and remedy must concern a particular district or subset of districts.
2. The District Court should have given the Conference an opportunity to provide evidence of member residency before dismissing its claims sua sponte for lack of standing, and remanded for reconsideration.
3. The need to comply with "one person, one vote", a redistricting principle that requires districts within the state to be nearly equal in population, was "taken as a given, when determining whether race, or other factors, predominate in a legislator's determination as to how equal population objectives will be met." If the legislature primarily used race to maintain racial percentages in the districts then under Miller v. Johnson the "plaintiff must prove that the legislature subordinated traditional race-neutral districting principles . . . to racial considerations."
4. After the Supreme Court ruling in Georgia v. Ashcroft Congress specifically revised Section 5 so it only bars legislative action that would diminish the ability of a minority group to elect their candidate of choice. Therefore, the Court rejected the District Court's alternative holding that redistricting to maintain the existing percentages of minority voters in each district was "narrowly tailored to comply with Section 5."

=== Dissents ===
Justice Antonin Scalia said the decision was "a sweeping holding that will have profound implications for the constitutional ideal of one person, one vote" which Alan Morrison said may be "the most overstated of Scalia's dissents".

== Subsequent case law ==
After Alabama Legislative held that "a mechanically numerical view as to what counts as forbidden retrogression" would not survive strict scrutiny, Justice Anthony Kennedy held in Bethune-Hill v. Virginia State Board of Elections that a "mechanically numerical" racial target always triggers strict scrutiny even when the redistricting adhered to traditional principles such as compactness. Justice Kennedy noted that in some cases the legislature may have "good reasons" to believe that a racial target is needed to avoid retrogression.
