= Shaw v. Reno =

1993 US Supreme Court case on gerrymandering

- Supreme Court of the United States

Argued April 20, 1993 Decided June 28, 1993
- Full case name: Ruth O. Shaw, et al., Appellants v. Janet Reno, Attorney General of the United States et al.
- Citations: 509 U.S. 630 (more) 113 S. Ct. 2816; 125 L. Ed. 2d 511; 61 U.S.L.W. 4818; 1993 U.S. LEXIS 4406

Case history
- Prior: Shaw v. Barr, 808 F. Supp. 461 (E.D.N.C. 1992)
- Subsequent: On remand, Shaw v. Hunt, 861 F. Supp. 408 (E.D.N.C. 1994); reversed, 517 U.S. 899 (1996); Hunt v. Cromartie, 526 U.S. 541 (1999); Easley v. Cromartie, 532 U.S. 234 (2001).

Holding
- Redistricting based on race must be held to a standard of strict scrutiny under the Equal Protection Clause while bodies doing redistricting must be conscious of race to the extent that they must ensure compliance with the Voting Rights Act of 1965.

Court membership
- Chief Justice William Rehnquist Associate Justices Byron White · Harry Blackmun; John P. Stevens · Sandra Day O'Connor; Antonin Scalia · Anthony Kennedy; David Souter · Clarence Thomas

Case opinions
- Majority: O'Connor, joined by Rehnquist, Scalia, Kennedy, Thomas
- Dissent: White, joined by Blackmun, Stevens
- Dissent: Blackmun
- Dissent: Stevens
- Dissent: Souter

Shaw v. Reno, 509 U.S. 630 (1993), was a landmark United States Supreme Court case in the area of redistricting and racial gerrymandering. After the 1990 census, North Carolina qualified to have a 12th district and drew it in a distinct snake-like manner to create a "majority-minority" Black district. From there, Ruth O. Shaw sued to challenge this proposed plan with the argument that this 12th district was unconstitutional and violated the Fourteenth Amendment under the Equal Protection Clause. In contrast, Janet Reno, the Attorney General, argued that the district would allow for minority groups to have a voice in elections. In the decision, the court ruled in a 5–4 majority that redistricting based on race must be held to a standard of strict scrutiny under the Equal Protection Clause and on the basis that it violated the Fourteenth Amendment because it was drawn solely based on race.

Shaw was an influential precedent in later voting rights cases, including Bush v. Vera and Miller v. Johnson. The North Carolina districts were upheld by the district court on remand, but the "snakelike" 12th congressional district was struck down by the Supreme Court in a decision on the merits in Shaw v. Hunt. The map was later restored as a partisan gerrymander and upheld in Easley v. Cromartie (2001).

== Background ==
Redistricting after the 1990 Census resulted in notable increases of black and Latino majority districts and more minority candidates being elected to Congress and state legislatures, sparking what some scholars have described as "white backlash" in several states including North Carolina. North Carolina's congressional districts were among the most litigated at the Supreme Court.

After the 1990 census, the North Carolina General Assembly gained a 12th seat in the U.S. House of Representatives. The state redrew its congressional districts as required by the "one person, one vote" principle. Their original plan included only one "majority-minority" district of majority Black voters. The North Carolina General Assembly submitted the plan to the U.S. Attorney General for preclearance under the Voting Rights Act, but it was rejected by the US Department of Justice. Attorney General Janet Reno instructed the North Carolina state assembly to add another majority-minority district to gain preclearance.

Democrats responded by passing a plan that included two irregularly-shaped black majority districts. The Wall Street Journal reported that District 1 looked like a "bug splattered on a windshield". District 12 was a 160 mile long "snakelike" corridor that tied together disparate populations of African-American voters. The district court dismissed a lawsuit filed to challenge the constitutionality of the gerrymandered districts on the grounds that the white plaintiffs had no claim for relief under United Jewish Organizations of Williamsburg v. Carey because the 14th amendment does not completely ban the use of racial factors for redistricting.

=== Voting Rights Act ===
==== Section 5: Preclearance ====
In 1870, following the Civil War and the abolishment of slavery, the 15th amendment was passed, giving all United States citizens the right to vote regardless of race, color, or previous conditions of servitude. After its enactment, many southern states openly supported and pursued the disenfranchisement of black voters by passing state laws that would have the effect of preventing blacks from exercising their right to vote. Some of these included poll taxes, literacy tests, and grandfather clauses (which stated that one can only vote if their grandfather voted). Eventually, after many decades, Section 5 of the Voting Rights Act of 1965 suspended literacy tests in states that had a history of racial gaps in voter turnout. Those states were required to seek preclearance before changing their election procedures, including drawing new district boundaries.

North Carolina was one of the states that needed federal preclearance. The state had not elected any black candidates to Congress since 1901. Two black-majority districts created by redistricting in 1992 each elected a black representative; these districts were challenged in the Shaw v. Reno case.

=== Section 2: Vote dilution ===
The Voting Rights Act protects minority voters against dilution resulting from redistricting maps that “crack” or “pack” a large and “geographically compact” minority population. Congress clarified the standard for vote dilution claims by amending Section 2 of the Voting Rights Acts in 1982 to allow claims with a discriminatory effect as well as a discriminatory purpose. After the Shaw v. Reno decision in 1993 invidious or harmful racial gerrymandering was more often analyzed under the equal protection clause.

== Supreme Court ==
=== Parties ===
Janet Reno (appellant) was the 78th Attorney General, appointed by President Clinton. Ruth O. Shaw (named appellee) was a white Democratic resident of the 12th district in North Carolina. The plaintiffs filed a lawsuit arguing that the redistricting was an unconstitutional racial gerrymander under the Equal Protection Clause. The white plaintiffs argued that they had an individual right to a colorblind electoral process. The Attorney General, argued that the creation of the second district was required by §5 of the Voting Rights Act.

=== Majority opinion ===
In a 5–4 decision written by Justice Sandra Day O'Connor the Court held that the "extremely irregular" shapes of the districts "rationally cannot be understood as anything other than an effort to separate voters into different districts on the basis of race, and that the separation lacks sufficient justification". The case is remembered for its statement of the harms of racial gerrymanders:

[W]e believe that reapportionment is one area in which appearances matter. A reapportionment plan that includes in one district individuals who belong to the same race, but who are otherwise widely separated by geographic and political boundaries, and who may have little in common with one another but the color of their skin, bears an uncomfortable resemblance to political apartheid. It reinforces the perception that members of the same racial group-regardless of their age, education, economic status, or the community in which they live-think alike, share the same political interests, and will prefer the same candidates at the polls. We have rejected such perceptions as impermissible racial stereotypes . . . The message that such districting sends to elected representatives is equally pernicious. When a district obviously is created solely to effectuate the perceived common interests of one racial group, elected officials are more likely to believe that their primary obligation is to represent only the members of that group, rather than their constituency as a whole. This is altogether antithetical to our system of representative democracy.

Justice O'Connor cited Justice Charles Evans Whittaker's concurrence from Gomillion v. Lightfoot recognizing the equal protection issue presented by racial gerrymanders. Based on the Voting Rights Act, race can be taken into account when redistricting plans are made, but the constitutionality of a districting plan that is "so bizarre on its face that it is 'unexplainable on grounds other than race'" may be challenged in court. Traditional districting principles "are objective factors that may serve to defeat a claim that a district has been gerrymandered on racial lines."

The Court acknowledged that there could be tension between the Fourteenth Amendment and some applications of the Voting Rights Act, but assumed without deciding that compliance with the Voting Rights Act was a compelling interest that could survive strict scrutiny when evidence of a violation is presented to the court. Therefore, the case was returned to the district court for further review.

=== Dissents ===
The dissenting opinion by Justice White argued that existing precedents of the Supreme Court have required proof that a group has been denied equal access to the political process.

The dissenting opinions from Justice Blackmun and Stevens also brought many of the same points as White and they also added that the purpose of the equal protection clause was only to protect those who have been historically discriminated against. Therefore, it should not apply to the White voters who brought this case.

Justice Souter noted the arbitrary nature of the strict scrutiny applied in this case. He detailed that the 12th district was ultimately drawn to benefit a minority group hence making the strict scrutiny applied to feel unreasonable:

The difference between constitutional and unconstitutional gerrymanders has nothing to do with whether they are based on assumptions about the groups they affect, but whether their purpose is to enhance the power of the group in control of the districting process at the expense of any minority group, and thereby to strengthen the unequal distribution of electoral power.

== Aftermath ==
=== Impact ===
The significance of the Shaw v. Reno decision is heavily debated but it had a lasting impact on how the Voting Rights Act was going to be enforced and the structure of the U.S. political system. Bernard Grofman said that he does not believe Shaw to be a game-changer, but notes the importance of Shaw's progeny cases.

In 1994 the district court held on remand that both of the challenged black-majority districts satisfied strict scrutiny because the state had a compelling interest in complying with the Section 5 preclearance requirement. The precleared plan was used again in the 1994 elections, and again two of the twelve candidates elected were African American. Litigation continued over the same districts in Shaw v. Hunt.

Shaw has been criticized for emphasizing geography over other measures of compactness. By placing more weight on the district lines drawn, rather than who they contain, this outlook has the potential to disenfranchise minorities, as courts may place more importance on the shape of the district rather than underrepresented people. Shaw fails to give criteria for an irregular drawing. It is, therefore, unclear how to prove when a shape is bizarre enough to constitute a clear racial motive.

=== Related cases ===
Soon after Shaw was decided lawsuits were filed challenging the constitutionality of majority-black districts in Georgia, Texas, Florida, and Louisiana. "Highly irregular" districts were called into question, but Shaw did not unpack what that means. After Miller v. Johnson ruled that Georgia used "race for its own sake and not other districting principles" the legal analysis shifted to focus more on the legislature's "predominant motive" than district shape. Alabama Legislative Black Caucus v. Alabama and Bethune-Hill v. Virginia State Board of Elections explained further how strict scrutiny standard applied when race was a predominant factor.

In Bush v. Vera, Justice Sandra Day O'Connor referred to Shaw v. Reno to explain the harms of racially motivated redistricting: "At the same time that we combat the symptoms of racial polarization in politics, we must strive to eliminate unnecessary race-based state action that appears to endorse the disease". In 2017, Justice Anthony Kennedy reiterated this basic premise: "The harms that flow from racial sorting include being personally subjected to a racial classification as well as being represented by a legislator who believes his primary obligation is to represent only members of a particular racial group."

North Carolina's black majority district was challenged again in the 2001 case, Easley v. Cromartie. In an opinion by Justice Stephen Breyer, the Supreme Court ruled that party dominance was the predominant factor in drawing the challenged district lines. In 2016 the Court in Cooper v. Harris once again considered whether the North Carolina congressional districts were unconstitutional racial gerrymanders; it was the fifth time the district had been challenged at the Supreme Court since the Shaw v. Reno decision.

== See also ==
- Wesberry v. Sanders, 376 U.S. 1 (1964): Earlier Georgia congressional redistricting case
- Wright v. Rockefeller, 376 U.S. 52 (1964)
- Miller v. Johnson, 515 U.S. 900 (1995)
- Bush v. Vera, 517 U.S. 952 (1996)
- Hunt v. Cromartie, 526 U.S. 541 (1999)
- Easley v. Cromartie, 532 U.S. 234 (2001)
- Georgia v. Ashcroft, 539 U.S. 461 (2003): Georgia State Senate redistricting case
- League of United Latin American Citizens v. Perry, 548 U.S. 399 (2006)
- Alabama Legislative Black Caucus v. Alabama, 575 U.S. ___ (2015)
- List of United States Supreme Court cases, volume 509
