= Easley v. Cromartie =

2001 US Supreme Court gerrymandering case

Easley v. Cromartie (also known as Hunt v. Cromartie)
- Supreme Court of the United States

Argued November 27, 2000 Decided April 18, 2001
- Full case name: Michael F. Easley, Governor of North Carolina v. Martin Cromartie, et al.
- Citations: 532 U.S. 234 (more) 121 S. Ct. 1452; 149 L. Ed. 2d 430

Case history
- Prior: Shaw v. Reno, 509 U.S. 630 (1993); on remand, Shaw v. Hunt, 861 F. Supp. 408 (E.D.N.C. 1994); reversed, Shaw v. Hunt, 517 U.S. 899 (1996); on remand, Cromartie v. Hunt, 34 F. Supp. 2d 1029; (E.D.N.C. 1998); reversed, Hunt v. Cromartie, 526 U.S. 541 (1999); on remand, Cromartie v. Hunt, 133 F. Supp. 2d 407 (E.D.N.C. 2000)

Holding
- The District Court's conclusion that the State violated the Equal Protection Clause in drawing the 1997 boundaries was based on clearly erroneous findings.

Court membership
- Chief Justice William Rehnquist Associate Justices John P. Stevens · Sandra Day O'Connor; Antonin Scalia · Anthony Kennedy; David Souter · Clarence Thomas; Ruth Bader Ginsburg · Stephen Breyer

Case opinions
- Majority: Breyer, joined by Stevens, O'Connor, Souter, Ginsburg
- Dissent: Thomas, joined by Rehnquist, Scalia, Kennedy

Easley v. Cromartie, 532 U.S. 234 (2001), is a North Carolina redistricting case, the fourth since the 1990 United States redistricting cycle.

== Background ==
After Shaw v. Reno and Shaw v. Hunt established that racial gerrymanders had to meet the standard of strict scrutiny, and determined that North Carolina's Twelfth Congressional District was an unconstitutional racial gerrymander, the Supreme Court once again considered District 12 in Hunt v. Cromartie,, and reversed a District Court decision which had ruled that the new boundaries were a racial gerrymander.

After the case was sent back to the lower court, the parties conducted further discovery and the three-judge District Court held a three-day trial. The District Court again ruled that North Carolina’s revised District 12 was unconstitutional. The court acknowledged that the enacted plan largely reflected the legislature's political objectives, however, it ultimately concluded that the legislature also relied on race-based criteria in drawing the district boundaries and lacked a compelling justification for doing so. Therefore, the court held that the district still violated the Equal Protection Clause.

The decision was appealed to the Supreme Court. The case appellant was Mike Easley, who became North Carolina governor following Jim Hunt.

== Supreme Court ==
The issue facing this Supreme Court case was Constitutional validity of the Congressional Districts in North Carolina. Specifically, the 12th district which cut through the southwestern portion of the state. The complaint of the plaintiff and North Carolina citizens was that the drawing of the district violated the Equal Protection Clause of the Constitution as the district was drawn primarily amongst racial considerations.

The dispositive issue was whether the evidence actually supported the lower court’s finding that North Carolina drew District 12 predominantly because of race rather than politics. The Court emphasized that plaintiffs challenging a district on racial gerrymandering grounds face a demanding burden of proof.

The Supreme Court acknowledged that the District Court was highly familiar with the case and had carefully reviewed the evidence, but it still concluded that the lower court’s finding—that race rather than politics predominated in drawing District 12—was not adequately supported. The Supreme Court found that parts of the expert witness testimony by Dr. Weber defending the redistricting weakened the testimony that the District Court relied on. Some of Weber's testimony appeared dismissive of the political considerations involved in redistricting, even though prior Supreme Court cases had emphasized that courts should respect the legislature’s role in balancing political interests during the districting process.

The Supreme Court acknowledged that there was some evidence supporting the District Court’s conclusion that race influenced the drawing of District 12, including certain statements by legislators and parts of Weber’s testimony. However, the Court held that this evidence was not enough to prove that race predominated over politics.

The Court emphasized that in North Carolina race and political affiliation were very closely linked, since Black voters strongly tended to support Democrats. Therefore, the key question was whether the legislature drew the district because of race itself or because it wanted to group Democratic voters together for partisan reasons. Justice Stephen Breyer concluded that "the party attacking the legislatively drawn boundaries must show at the least that the legislature could have achieved its legitimate political objectives in alternative ways that are comparably consistent with traditional districting principles", and in this case, the plaintiffs were not able to meet this demanding burden of proof.

== See also ==
- Shaw v. Reno, 509 U.S. 630 (1993)
- Hunt v. Cromartie, 526 U.S. 541 (1999)
- List of United States Supreme Court cases, volume 532
