= Hunt v. Cromartie =

1999 US Supreme Court gerrymandering case

- Supreme Court of the United States

Argued January 20, 1999 Decided May 17, 1999
- Full case name: James B. Hunt Jr., Governor of North Carolina, et al., Appellants v. Martin Cromartie, et al.
- Citations: 526 U.S. 541 (more) 119 S. Ct. 1545; 143 L. Ed. 2d 731

Case history
- Prior: Shaw v. Reno, 509 U.S. 630 (1993); on remand, Shaw v. Hunt, 861 F. Supp. 408 (E.D.N.C. 1994); reversed, 517 U.S. 899 (1996); on remand, Cromartie v. Hunt, 34 F. Supp. 2d 1029; (E.D.N.C. 1998)
- Subsequent: On remand, Cromartie v. Hunt, 133 F. Supp. 2d 407 (E.D.N.C. 2000); reversed, Easley v. Cromartie, 532 U.S. 234 (2001).

Holding
- The 12th district of North Carolina as drawn was unconstitutional because it was created for the purpose of placing African Americans in one district, thereby constituting illegal racial gerrymandering.

Court membership
- Chief Justice William Rehnquist Associate Justices John P. Stevens · Sandra Day O'Connor; Antonin Scalia · Anthony Kennedy; David Souter · Clarence Thomas; Ruth Bader Ginsburg · Stephen Breyer

Case opinions
- Majority: Thomas, joined by Rehnquist, O'Connor, Scalia, Kennedy
- Concurrence: Stevens (in judgment), joined by Souter, Ginsburg, Breyer

Laws applied
- U.S. Const. amend. XIV

Hunt v. Cromartie, 526 U.S. 541 (1999), was a United States Supreme Court case regarding North Carolina's 12th congressional district.

== Background ==
In an earlier case, Shaw v. Reno, 509 U.S. 630 (1993), the Supreme Court held that voters had stated a valid Equal Protection claim by alleging that North Carolina intentionally separated voters into districts primarily on the basis of race without sufficient justification. The Court recognized that racial gerrymandering could violate the Fourteenth Amendment to the United States Constitution even when the district was created to benefit minority representation. racial gerrymandering.

After the case was sent back to the lower courts, the Supreme Court revisited the issue in Shaw v. Hunt (“Shaw II”). There, the Court agreed with the lower court that District 12 had in fact been drawn predominantly according to race. Applying strict scrutiny, the Court further held that North Carolina’s districting plan was not narrowly tailored to serve a compelling governmental interest.

Together, the Shaw decisions established the following principle: when race is the predominant factor in drawing electoral districts, the plan is subject to strict scrutiny under the Equal Protection Clause.

After the Supreme Court invalidated North Carolina’s original Twelfth Congressional District in Shaw v. Hunt, the state adopted a revised redistricting plan in 1997. The Court original District 12 boundaries were "bizarre" enough that the Court had considered the district shape important evidence that race had predominated in the line-drawing process.

North Carolina’s new 1997 plan modified the district in several ways. The shape of the district was more compact and black residents no longer made up the majority. However, the district was still shaped like "snakelike" corridor, and was challenged again as an unconstitutional gerrymander.

The redrawn 12th district boundaries were then thrown out in a summary judgment by a three judge panel in Eastern District of North Carolina.

== Supreme Court ==
When appealed to the Supreme Court, Justice Thomas wrote for all nine justices saying that the District Court erred in granting summary judgement, while Justice Stevens concurred in an opinion indicating that he and three other justices would have upheld the 12th district as a legal partisan gerrymander.

=== Decision ===
North Carolina argued that the district was drawn for political—not racial—reasons, specifically to create a strong Democratic district, protect incumbents, preserve the existing partisan balance, and follow traditional districting principles.

The state supported this argument with affidavits from legislators and expert testimony from Dr. David Peterson. Peterson analyzed voting, racial, and demographic data along the district’s entire border and found a strong correlation between Black voters and Democratic voters. Because race and party affiliation overlapped so heavily, the evidence could support either a racial or political explanation.

Peterson concluded that the district lines more consistently included heavily Democratic precincts rather than simply heavily Black precincts, suggesting that politics explained the district’s shape at least as well as race. This evidence weakened the plaintiffs’ argument. Peterson also showed that party registration and voting preference did not always match in North Carolina.

Because the case was at the summary judgment stage, the lower court was required to accept the state’s political explanation as true if supported by evidence. Under prior Supreme Court precedents, political gerrymandering is constitutionally permissible even when political affiliation strongly correlates with race. Thus, the fact that many Black voters were concentrated in District 12 was not enough by itself to prove unconstitutional racial gerrymandering when the evidence also supported a partisan explanation.

== Subsequent developments ==
After the case was sent back down, the District Court after a three-day trial again found that the 12th district was an illegal racial gerrymander, resulting in another Supreme Court appeal and the ruling Easley v. Cromartie, 532 U.S. 234 (2001). (Mike Easley replaced Jim Hunt as Governor of North Carolina, resulting in the change of name.) In Easley v. Cromartie, the Supreme Court ruled that the state was able to justify the new boundaries of the 12th district by showing that it was intended to create a safe seat for Democrats, and therefore the redrawn district was a constitutional example of political gerrymandering. Justice O'Connor acted as the swing vote, satisfied with the change in reasoning since Shaw v. Reno, despite not joining Justice Stevens' concurrence in the 1999 case.

== See also ==
- Shaw v. Reno, 509 U.S. 630 (1993)
- Easley v. Cromartie, 532 U.S. 234 (2001)
- List of United States Supreme Court cases, volume 526
