= 1970 United States redistricting cycle =

The 1970 United States redistricting cycle took place following the completion of the 1970 United States census. In all fifty states, various bodies re-drew state legislative and congressional districts. States that are apportioned more than one seat in the United States House of Representatives also drew new districts for that legislative body. The resulting new districts were first implemented for the 1972 elections.

Several new laws and judicial decisions throughout the 1960s and the Civil rights movement impacted the 1970-1972 redistricting process, including Wesberry v. Sanders, Reynolds v. Sims, Gomillion v. Lightfoot, Gray v. Sanders, Baker v. Carr, the ratification of the 24th Amendment, and the passage of the Voting Rights Act of 1965 and the Uniform Congressional District Act of 1967.

== U.S. House districts ==
Eliminated districts	Created districts
Alabama 8; Iowa 7; New York 40; New York 41; North Dakota 1; North Dakota 2; Ohio 24; Pennsylvania 26; Pennsylvania 27; Tennessee 9; West Virginia 5; Wisconsin 10	Arizona 4; California 39; California 40; California 41; California 42; California 43; Colorado 5; Florida 13; Florida 14; Florida 15; North Dakota at-large; Texas 24

== See also ==
- Redistricting in the United States
