= Avery v. Midland County =

- Supreme Court of the United States

Argued November 14, 1967 Decided April 1, 1968
- Full case name: Avery v. Midland County, et al.
- Citations: 390 U.S. 474 (more) 88 S. Ct. 1114; 20 L. Ed. 2d 45

Case history
- Prior: Certiorari to the Supreme Court of Texas

Holding
- The Court struck down local governmental districts inequality based their decision on the principle of "one man, one vote."

Court membership
- Chief Justice Earl Warren Associate Justices Hugo Black · William O. Douglas; John M. Harlan II · William J. Brennan Jr. Potter Stewart · Byron White; Abe Fortas · Thurgood Marshall

Case opinions
- Majority: White, joined by Warren, Black, Douglas, Brennan
- Dissent: Harlan
- Dissent: Fortas
- Dissent: Stewart
- Marshall took no part in the consideration or decision of the case.

Laws applied
- U.S. Const. amend. XIV, Equal Protection Clause
- This case overturned a previous ruling or rulings
- Colegrove v. Green, 328 U.S. 549 (1946)

Avery v. Midland County, 390 U.S. 474 (1968), is a United States Supreme Court case that ruled that local government districts had to be roughly equal in population.

== Background ==
Having already held in 1965 in Reynolds v. Sims that disparities in legislative districts violated the Equal Protection Clause of the Fourteenth Amendment to the United States Constitution, the Supreme Court applied the same logic to local government districts for bodies which also have broad policy-making functions.

The case was brought by Henry Clifton Avery, Jr., more commonly known as Hank Avery, who was Mayor of the City of Midland, Texas. He challenged the districting scheme for the Commissioners Court of Midland County, a five-member county commission with four Commissioners elected in single-member districts and the County Judge elected at-large. One Commissioner's district, which included almost all the City of Midland, had a population of 67,906, according to 1963 estimates. The others, all rural areas, had populations respectively, of about 852; 414; and 828.

Avery brought his case in Texas District Court in Midland. Three of the four commissioners testified at trial that population was not a major factor in the districting process. The trial court ruled for petitioner that each district under the State's constitutional apportionment standard should have "substantially the same number of people." An intermediate appellate court reversed. The Texas Supreme Court reversed that judgment, holding that under the Federal and State Constitutions the districting scheme was impermissible "for the reasons stated by the trial court." It held, however, that the work actually done by the County Commissioners "disproportionately concerns the rural areas" and that such factors as "number of qualified voters, land areas, geography, miles of county roads, and taxable values" could justify apportionment otherwise than on a basis of substantially equal populations.

== Opinion of the Court ==
The five justices who struck down local district inequality based their decision on the precedent in Reynolds v. Sims. Writing for the majority, Associate Justice Byron White said, "In a word, institutions of local government have always been a major aspect of our system, and their responsible and responsive operation is today of increasing importance to the quality of life of more and more of our citizens. We therefore see little difference, in terms of the application of the Equal Protection Clause and of the principles of Reynolds v. Sims, between the exercise of state power through legislatures and its exercise by elected officials in the cities, towns, and counties."

In dissent, Justice John Marshall Harlan II asserted that the Writ of Certiorari to the Texas Supreme Court was improvidently granted in that the decision was not final, since the Texas court had ordered the county to redistrict. He also resumed his objections to the line of cases started with Reynolds v. Sims saying, "I continue to think that these adventures of the Court in the realm of political science are beyond its constitutional powers, for reasons set forth at length in my dissenting opinion in Reynolds, 377 U.S., at 589 et seq."

Justices Fortas and Stewart agreed with Justice Harlan that the Writ of Certiorari was improvidently granted as the decision was not yet final, but disagreed as to their reasoning on the merits of the case.

Justice Thurgood Marshall took no part in the deliberation of the case.

== See also ==
- Rotten and pocket boroughs, an English phenomenon
- List of United States Supreme Court cases, volume 390
- One Person, One Vote
