= Redistricting =

Process of drawing electoral district boundaries in the United States

In the United States, redistricting is the process of drawing electoral district boundaries. For the United States House of Representatives, and state legislatures, redistricting occurs after each ten-year census.

The U.S. Constitution in Article 1, Section 2, Clause 3 provides for apportionment of seats in the U.S. House of Representatives based on the population of each state. The Reapportionment Act of 1929 required that the number of seats in the chamber is kept at a constant 435, and a 1941 act made the reapportionment among the states by population automatic after every decennial census. Reapportionment occurs at the federal level followed by redistricting at the state level. According to Colegrove v. Green, 328 U.S. 549 (1946), Article I, Section 4 left to the legislature of each state the authority to establish congressional districts. Such decisions are subject to judicial review. In most states, redistricting is subject to political maneuvering, but some states have created independent commissions.

The 1967 Uniform Congressional District Act requires that representatives are elected from single-member districts. When a state has a single representative, that district will be statewide. Gerrymandering in the redistricting process has been a problem since the early days of the republic and has never been addressed by Congress.

== Legislative representatives ==
=== Federal ===
Allocation of districts following the 2020 census

Partisan control of congressional redistricting after the 2020 elections, with the number of U.S. House seats each state will receive: Democratic control Republican control Split or bipartisan control Independent redistricting commission No redistricting necessary

Six states have a single representative in the United States House of Representatives, because of their low populations. These are Alaska, Delaware, North Dakota, South Dakota, Vermont, and Wyoming. These states do not need redistricting for the House and elect members on a state-wide at-large basis.

In 25 states, the state legislature has primary responsibility for creating a redistricting plan, in many cases subject to approval by the state governor. To reduce the role that legislative politics might play, thirteen states (Alaska, (Note: Since Alaska only has a single representative, its congressional redistricting laws are not currently in force.) Arizona, California, Colorado, Hawaii, Idaho, Michigan, Missouri, Montana, New Jersey, Ohio, Pennsylvania, and Washington) determine congressional redistricting by an independent or bipartisan redistricting commission. Five states: Maine, New York, Rhode Island, Vermont, (Note: Since Vermont only has a single representative, its congressional redistricting laws are not currently in force.) and Virginia give independent bodies authority to propose redistricting plans, but preserve the role of legislatures to approve them. Arkansas has a commission composed of its governor, attorney general, and secretary of state.

By law, the forty-four states with more than one representative must redistrict after each decennial census to account for population shifts within the state and, when necessary, to increase or decrease the state's representation to add or remove congressional districts. Federal law, including the Constitution, does not prevent states from redistricting at any time between censuses, up to and including redistricting prior to each congressional election, provided such redistricting conforms to various federal laws.

Congressional mid-decade redistricting legality by state

Legislative mid-decade redistricting legality by state

Allowed
Tied to census or year
Tied to census by statute
Prohibited except with 2/3 majority
Prohibited by statute
Prohibited
Prohibition temporarily suspended

"Mid-decade" redistricting proposals, such as what occurred in 2003 in Texas, and in several states in 2025 and 2026, have typically been highly controversial. Because of this, many states prohibit mid-decade redistricting. This is more prevalent for state legislative redistricting than for congressional redistricting. Some also link it to a specific year or to the decennial census. It is unclear to what extent mid-decade redistricting would be legal in those states.

Apart from mid-decade redistricting initiated by state legislatures, both federal and state courts can also order the redistricting of certain maps between-censuses, because said maps were ruled unconstitutional or against federal or state law, for example. Examples of this are the redistricting that occurred between the 2016 and 2018 elections in Pennsylvania, or the redistricting that occurred in North Carolina.

=== State ===
State constitutions and laws mandate which body has responsibility over drawing the state legislature boundaries.

Some states use multi-member districts to elect state legislators. In those cases and perhaps in others, districts can be changed to accommodate multiple members. So district magnitude as well as size of and configuration of districts, is determined by state authorities.

=== Local ===
Those municipal governments that are elected on a district basis, as opposed to an at-large city-wide basis, also redistrict.

=== Redistricting criteria ===
The Reapportionment Act of 1929 did not state any size and population requirements for congressional districts, last stated in the Apportionment Act of 1911, since the 1911 Act was still in force. However, the Supreme Court ruled that the 1911 Act was no longer in force even though Congress never repealed it. The previous apportionment acts required districts be contiguous, compact, and equally populated.

Each state can set its own standards for congressional and legislative districts. In addition to equalizing the population of districts and complying with federal requirements, criteria may include attempting to create compact, contiguous districts, trying to keep political units and communities within a single district, and avoiding the drawing of boundaries for purposes of partisan advantage or incumbent protection.

Redistricting may follow other criteria depending on state and local laws:

1. compactness
2. contiguity
3. equal population
4. preservation of existing political communities
5. partisan fairness
6. racial fairness

== Gerrymandering ==
Gerrymandering, the practice of drawing district boundaries to achieve political advantage for legislators, involves the manipulation of district boundaries to leave out, or include, specific populations in a particular district to ensure a legislator's reelection or to advantage their party.

In states where the legislature, or another body where a partisan majority is possible, is in charge of redistricting, the possibility of gerrymandering (the deliberate manipulation of political boundaries for electoral advantage, usually of incumbents or a specific political party) often makes the process very politically contentious, especially when the majorities of the two houses of the legislature, or the legislature and the governor, are from different parties.

Partisan domination of state legislatures and improved technology to design contiguous districts that pack opponents into as few districts as possible have led to district maps which are skewed towards one party. Consequently, many states including Florida, Georgia, Maryland, Michigan, North Carolina, Ohio, Pennsylvania, Texas and Wisconsin have succeeded in reducing or effectively eliminating competition for most House seats in those states. Some states, including New Jersey and New York, protect incumbents of both parties, reducing the number of competitive districts.

The state and federal court systems are often involved in resolving disputes over congressional and legislative redistricting when gridlock prevents redistricting in a timely manner. Those disadvantaged by a proposed redistricting plan may challenge it in state and federal courts. Justice Department approval, which is known as pre-clearance, was formerly required under Section 5 of the Voting Rights Act of 1965 in certain states that had a history of racial barriers to voting. The Supreme Court's ruling on the Pennsylvania redistricting effectively allows elected officials to select their constituents, by eliminating most of the grounds for constituents to challenge district lines.

== Other redistricting reforms ==
In addition to the establishments of redistricting commissions in multiple states, proposals have been fielded to draft interstate compacts between states on congressional redistricting. These have been proposed in the legislatures of Maryland and Illinois since the 2010s in order to reduce redistricting-related litigation, prevent partisan "arms races" over reapportionment and partisan gerrymandering, and reduce perceptions of nonpartisan redistricting as unilateral disarmament. To date, no such compacts have been approved by legislature or referendum.

== U.S. Supreme Court redistricting cases ==
- Colegrove v. Green (1946)
- Baker v. Carr (1962) — federal courts may review redistricting of state legislative districts
- Gray v. Sanders (1963) — 14th Amendment's equal protection clause requires “one person, one vote” standard
- Wesberry v. Sanders (1964) — legislative districts for the U.S. House of Representatives must be composed, to the extent practicable, of equal numbers of eligible voters
- Burns v. Richardson (1966)
- Reynolds v. Sims (1964)
- Gaffney v. Cummings (1973)
- Karcher v. Daggett (1983)
- Thornburg v. Gingles (1986)
- Davis v. Bandemer (1986)
- Growe v. Emison (1993)
- Voinovich v. Quilter (1993)
- Shaw v. Reno (1993)
- Johnson v. DeGrandy (1994)
- Miller v. Johnson (1995)
- Bush v. Vera (1996)
- Hunt v. Cromartie (1999)
- Vieth v. Jubelirer (2004)
- League of United Latin American Citizens v. Perry (2006)
- Bartlett v. Strickland (2009)
- Arizona State Legislature v. Arizona Independent Redistricting Commission (2015)
- Gill v. Whitford (2018)
- Benisek v. Lamone (2018 & 2019)
- Rucho v. Common Cause (2019)
- Allen v. Milligan (2023)
- Moore v. Harper (2023)
- Alexander v. South Carolina State Conference of the NAACP (2023)
- Louisiana v. Callais (2026)

== See also ==
- Boundary commissions (United Kingdom)
- United States congressional apportionment
