= Redistricting in Alabama =

Alabama's current (as of 2023) congressional district map

Redistricting in Alabama is the process by which boundaries are redrawn for federal congressional and state legislative districts. It has historically been highly controversial. Critics have accused legislators of attempting to protect themselves from competition by gerrymandering districts.

== History ==
=== 20th century ===
The Alabama Legislature did not redraw or modify their state legislative districts from 1901 until after the U.S. Supreme Court's 1964 decision in Reynolds v. Sims, in which the court ruled that state legislative districts must be roughly equal in population.

The 1960 case in Gomillion v. Lightfoot successfully challenged racial gerrymandering in the city of Tuskegee.

The 1980 decision in Mobile v. Bolden held that disproportionate effects alone, absent purposeful discrimination, are insufficient to establish a claim of racial discrimination affecting voting and redistricting. However, after the case was remanded to lower court, subsequent litigation and legislation moved the Mobile City Council from at-large elections to single-winner districts, resulting in the election of African Americans to the city council for the first time since Reconstruction.

Despite advances in voting rights, no African American was elected to Congress from Alabama until after redistricting in 1991, in which the 7th congressional district was redrawn to encompass portions of urban Birmingham and Alabama's eastern Black Belt region. The redrawn district, now majority nonwhite, elected Earl Hilliard Sr. to the U.S. House in 1992, becoming the first Black member from Alabama since Jeramiah Haralson in 1877.

=== 21st century ===
==== 2010s ====
In the 2010 election, both chambers of the legislature flipped parties, with many Democratic members switching parties, resulting in Republicans having control over redistricting for the first time in state history. In the resulting 2010 United States redistricting cycle, the legislature moved to protect Republican incumbents.

In Alabama Legislative Black Caucus v. Alabama, the U.S. Supreme Court ruled that racial gerrymandering cases pursuant to the Voting Rights Act must be pursued on a district by district basis, rather than by looking at the state as an undifferentiated whole.

Originally, due to a history of disenfranchisement and unfair voting rules, Alabama's congressional and legislative map-making process was subject to preclearance under the Section 5 of the Voting Rights Act. However, the Supreme Court removed the preclearance requirement in Shelby County v Holder.

==== 2020s ====
After the 2020 Census and the 2020 redistricting cycle, the Alabama Legislature largely instituted the same congressional and legislative maps which have been in place since 1993. Soon after, multiple groups of plaintiffs sued, asserting the districts violated Section 2 of the Voting Rights Act of 1965 and the Fourteenth Amendment to the United States Constitution. The plaintiffs sought the creation of an additional majority-minority district. In Allen v. Milligan, the court ruled 5–4 that Alabama's districts likely violated the VRA, maintained an injunction that required Alabama to create an additional majority-minority district, and held that Section 2 of the VRA is constitutional in the redistricting context.

On October 5, 2023, a panel of three federal judges ruled that Alabama illegally diluted the Black population of southern Alabama into three separate districts, striking down the maps that were put in place a couple years ago, creating a new Black-majority district in southern Alabama, alongside the one in the north stretching from the city of Birmingham to Tuscaloosa.

On August 22, 2025, a U.S. District Court Judge for the Northern District of Alabama held that the State of Alabama drew a state senate map in violation of the Section 2 of Voting Rights Act of 1965. The judge ordered the State of Alabama redraw an additional black-majority senate district. In a similar ruling, the Court ordered Alabama to use its remedial congressional map until 2030.
