= Baker v. Carr =

- Supreme Court of the United States

Argued April 19–20, 1961 Reargued October 9, 1961 Decided March 26, 1962
- Full case name: Charles W. Baker et al. v. Joe. C. Carr et al.
- Citations: 369 U.S. 186 (more) 82 S. Ct. 691; 7 L. Ed. 2d 663; 1962 U.S. LEXIS 1567

Case history
- Prior: 179 F. Supp. 824 (M.D. Tenn. 1959), probable jurisdiction noted, 364 U.S. 898 (1960). Appeal from the United States District Court for the Middle District of Tennessee
- Subsequent: On remand, 206 F. Supp. 341 (M.D. Tenn. 1962)

Holding
- The redistricting of state legislative districts is not a political question. Therefore, cases related to the aforementioned are justiciable by the federal courts.

Court membership
- Chief Justice Earl Warren Associate Justices Hugo Black · Felix Frankfurter; William O. Douglas · Tom C. Clark; John M. Harlan II · William J. Brennan Jr. Charles E. Whittaker · Potter Stewart

Case opinions
- Majority: Brennan, joined by Warren, Black, Douglas, Clark, Stewart
- Concurrence: Douglas
- Concurrence: Clark
- Concurrence: Stewart
- Dissent: Frankfurter, joined by Harlan
- Dissent: Harlan, joined by Frankfurter
- Whittaker took no part in the consideration or decision of the case.

Laws applied
- U.S. Const. amend. XIV; U.S. Const. art. III; 42 U.S.C. § 1983; Tenn. Const. art. II
- This case overturned a previous ruling or rulings
- Colegrove v. Green, 328 U.S. 549 (1946) (in part)

Baker v. Carr, 369 U.S. 186 (1962), was a landmark United States Supreme Court case in which the Court held that redistricting qualifies as a justiciable question under the Fourteenth Amendment's equal protection clause, thus enabling federal courts to hear Fourteenth Amendment-based redistricting cases. The court summarized its Baker holding in a later decision as follows: "the Equal Protection Clause of the Fourteenth Amendment limits the authority of a State Legislature in designing the geographical districts from which representatives are chosen either for the State Legislature or for the Federal House of Representatives." (Gray v. Sanders, 372 U.S. 368 (1963)). The court had previously held in Gomillion v. Lightfoot that districting claims over racial discrimination could be brought under the Fifteenth Amendment.

The case arose from a lawsuit against the state of Tennessee, which had not conducted redistricting since 1901. Tennessee argued that the composition of legislative districts constituted a nonjusticiable political question, as the U.S. Supreme Court had held in Colegrove v. Green (1946). In a majority opinion joined by five other justices, Justice William J. Brennan Jr. held that redistricting did not qualify as a political question, though he remanded the case to the federal district court for further proceedings. Justice Felix Frankfurter strongly dissented, arguing that the Court's decision cast aside history and judicial restraint and violated the separation of powers between legislatures and courts.

The case did not have any immediate effect on electoral districts, but it set an important precedent regarding the power of federal courts to address redistricting. In 1964, the Supreme Court handed down two cases, Wesberry v. Sanders and Reynolds v. Sims, that required the United States House of Representatives and state legislatures to establish electoral districts of equal population on the principle of one person, one vote.

== Background ==
Plaintiff Charles Baker was a Republican who lived in Shelby County, Tennessee, and had served as the mayor of Millington, near Memphis. The Tennessee State Constitution required that the Tennessee General Assembly's legislative districts be redrawn every ten years to provide for districts of substantially equal population (as was to be done for congressional districts). Baker's complaint was that Tennessee had not redistricted since 1901, in response to the 1900 census. He was represented by Charles S. Rhyne, a Washington, D.C. attorney and former president of the American Bar Association.

By the time of Baker's lawsuit, the population had shifted such that his district in Shelby County had about ten times as many residents as some of the rural districts. Rural citizens' votes were thus overrepresented compared to those of urban citizens. Baker's argument was that this discrepancy was causing him to fail to receive the "equal protection of the laws" the Fourteenth Amendment requires. Defendant Joe Carr was sued in his position as Tennessee Secretary of State. Carr was not the person who set the district lines – the state legislature had done that – but was sued ex officio as the person ultimately responsible for the conduct of elections in the state and the publication of district maps.

Tennessee argued that the composition of legislative districts was essentially a political question, not a judicial one, as had been held by Colegrove v. Green, a plurality opinion of the Court in which Justice Felix Frankfurter declared that "Courts ought not to enter this political thicket." Frankfurter believed that relief for legislative malapportionment had to be won through the political process.

== Decision ==
Baker v. Carr was one of the most wrenching decisions in the Court's history. The case had to be put over for reargument because in conference no clear majority emerged for either side of the case. Justice Charles Evans Whittaker was so torn over the case that he eventually had to recuse himself for health reasons. The arduous decision process in Baker is often blamed for Whittaker's health problems, which forced him to retire from the Court in 1962.

The opinion was finally handed down in March 1962, nearly a year after it was initially argued. The Court split 6 to 2 in ruling that Baker's case was justiciable, producing, in addition to the opinion of the Court by Justice William J. Brennan, three concurring opinions and two dissenting opinions. Brennan reformulated the political question doctrine, identifying six factors to help in determining which questions are "political" in nature. Cases that are political in nature are marked by:

1. "Textually demonstrable constitutional commitment of the issue to a coordinate political department"; as an example, Brennan cited issues of foreign affairs and executive war powers, arguing that cases involving such matters would be "political questions"
2. "A lack of judicially discoverable and manageable standards for resolving it";
3. "The impossibility of deciding without an initial policy determination of a kind clearly for nonjudicial discretion";
4. "The impossibility of a court's undertaking independent resolution without expressing lack of the respect due coordinate branches of government";
5. "An unusual need for unquestioning adherence to a political decision already made"; and
6. "The potentiality of embarrassment from multifarious pronouncements by various departments on one question."

Justice Tom C. Clark switched his vote at the last minute to a concurrence on the substance of Baker's claims, which would have enabled a majority that could have granted relief for Baker. Instead, the Supreme Court remanded the case to the District Court.

The large majority in this case can in many ways be attributed to Brennan, who convinced Justice Potter Stewart that the case was a narrow ruling dealing only with the right to challenge the statute. Brennan also talked down Justices Hugo Black and William O. Douglas from their usual absolutist positions to achieve a compromise.

== Dissent by Justices Frankfurter and Harlan ==
Frankfurter, joined by Justice John Marshall Harlan II, dissented vigorously and at length, arguing that the Court had cast aside history and judicial restraint, and violated the separation of powers between legislatures and Courts. He wrote:

Appellants invoke the right to vote and to have their votes counted. But they are permitted to vote and their votes are counted. They go to the polls, they cast their ballots, they send their representatives to the state councils. Their complaint is simply that the representatives are not sufficiently numerous or powerful.

== Aftermath ==
Having declared redistricting issues justiciable in Baker, the court laid out a new test for evaluating such claims. The Court formulated the "one person, one vote" standard under American jurisprudence for legislative redistricting, holding that every person had to be weighted equally in legislative apportionment. This affected numerous state legislatures that had not redistricted congressional districts for decades, despite major population shifts. It also ultimately affected the composition of state legislative districts, which in Alabama and many other states had overrepresented rural districts and underrepresented urban districts with much greater populations.

This principle was formally enunciated in Reynolds v. Sims (1964). The Court decided that in states with bicameral legislatures, like Alabama, the state in this case, both houses had to be apportioned on this standard. This voided the Alabama Constitution's provision for two state senators from each county and similar provisions elsewhere. Similarly, the Tennessee Constitution prevented counties from being split and portions of a county from being attached to other counties or parts of counties in creating a legislative district. This was overridden on the principle of basing districts on population. Today counties are frequently split among districts in forming Tennessee State Senate districts. "One person, one vote" was first applied as a standard for Congressional districts in Wesberry v. Sanders. State legislatures were supposed to redistrict according to population changes, but many had not for decades.

Baker v. Carr and subsequent cases fundamentally changed the nature of political representation in the United States, requiring not just Tennessee but nearly every state to redistrict during the 1960s, often several times. This reapportionment increased urban areas' political power and reduced that of more rural areas. After he left the Court, Chief Justice Earl Warren called the Baker v. Carr line of cases the most important in his tenure as Chief.

== See also ==
Subsequent cases regarding size/proportionality:

- Gray v. Sanders, 372 U.S. 368 (1963): "One person, one vote." Statewide elections (U.S. senator, governor, etc.) must not employ a geographical-unit system that renders some votes greater than others because it "violates the Equal Protection Clause of the Fourteenth Amendment", and "once a geographical unit for which a representative is to be chosen is designated, all who participate in the election must have an equal vote" (Georgia).
- Wesberry v. Sanders, 376 U.S. 1 (1964): Districts for United States House of Representatives must be approximately equal in population as established by Article 1, Section 2 of the Constitution (Georgia).
- Reynolds v. Sims, 377 U.S. 533 (1964): Districts for state legislatures (both chambers) must be approximately equal in population as established by Equal Protection (Alabama).
- Kirkpatrick v. Preisler, 394 U.S. 526 (1969): "[A]s nearly as is practicable", the equal population requirement for congressional districts does not permit any de minimis deviations from population equality, no matter how small (Missouri).
- Moore v. Ogilvie, 394 U.S. 814 (1969): Invalidated a county-based procedure that diluted the influence of citizens in larger counties in the nominating process. "The idea that one group can be granted greater voting strength than another is hostile to the one man, one vote basis of our representative government" (Illinois).
- Hadley v. Junior College District, 397 U.S. 50 (1970): when members of an elected body are chosen from separate districts, each district must be established on a basis that will ensure that equal numbers of voters can vote for proportionally equal numbers of officials (Missouri). Evenwel v. Abbott 136 U.S. 1120 (2016) later avoided ruling on the validity of basing representation on "equal number of voters" rather than "equal numbers of people."
- Mahan v. Howell, 410 U.S. 315 (1973): approving a state legislative map with maximum population deviation of 16% to accommodate the State's interest in "maintaining the integrity of political subdivision lines", but cautioning that this deviation "may well approach tolerable limits" (Virginia).
- Gaffney v. Cummings, 412 U.S. 735 (1973): "Minor deviations from mathematical equality among state legislative districts", such as a deviation of 7.83%, are not automatically unconstitutional but rather allowable where there are legitimate State interests (Connecticut).
- Karcher v. Daggett, 462 U.S. 725 (1983): The "equal representation" standard of Art. I, § 2, requires a "good faith" effort to ensure congressional districts be apportioned to achieve population equality. No such good faith was used for a ~1% deviation, which is therefore unconstitutional (New Jersey).
- Brown v. Thomson, 462 U.S. 835 (1983): An apportionment plan with population disparities larger than 10% creates a prima facie case of discrimination and therefore must be justified by the State (Wyoming).
- Board of Estimate of City of New York v. Morris, 489 U.S. 688 (1989): City Board of Estimate unconstitutional because each borough, despite having widely disparate populations, had equal representation on the board (New York).
- Evenwel v. Abbott, 578 U.S. ___ (2016) District drawn using total population ("one person, one vote") are valid even when the result is wide deviation among voting population (~40%). Ruling withheld as to whether states may alternatively draw district maps using eligible voters rather than total population (Texas).

Subsequent cases regarding racial composition:

- City of Mobile v. Bolden, 446 U.S. 55 (1980): A municipal electoral system is constitutional if it has no discriminatory purpose, even if it has a discriminatory effect (Alabama).
- Thornburg v. Gingles, 478 U.S. 30 (1986): Three preconditions required to find a redistricting plan violates VRA §2[a]: the minority group is (1) "sufficiently large and geographically compact to constitute a majority in a single-member district" and (2) "politically cohesive" and (3) the "majority votes sufficiently as a bloc to enable it [to] usually to defeat the minority's preferred candidate" (North Carolina).
- Shaw v. Reno, 509 U.S. 630 (1993): Attempt to create an additional majority-minority Congressional district challenged and held invalid because redistricting based on race must be held to a standard of strict scrutiny under the equal protection clause (North Carolina).
- Miller v. Johnson, 515 U.S. 900 (1995): Attempt to create an additional majority-minority Congressional district challenged and held invalid because it required the creation of a "geographic monstrosity", thereby violating Equal Protection of the majority. Justice Department "maximization" policy not a sufficiently compelling governmental interest (Georgia).
- Georgia v. Ashcroft, 539 U.S. 461 (2003): The District Court failed to consider all relevant factors in evaluating a 1997 State Senate districting plan; remanded for additional scrutiny (Georgia).
- Bartlett v. Strickland, 556 U.S. 1 (2009): "Cross-over" voters (members of a majority who tend to vote for the preferred candidate of the minority) should not be attributed to the minority group when calculating whether the minority constitutes a numerical majority of the voting-age population relative to Gingles 1st criteria (North Carolina).
- Alabama Legislative Black Caucus v. Alabama, 575 U.S. ___ (2015): Racial gerrymandering claims must be considered district by district rather than by looking at the state as an undifferentiated whole (Alabama).
