= Colegrove v. Green =

- Supreme Court of the United States

Argued March 7–8, 1946 Decided June 10, 1946
- Full case name: Colegrove et al. v. Green et al.
- Citations: 328 U.S. 549 (more) 66 S. Ct. 1198; 90 L. Ed. 1432

Case history
- Prior: Dismissed, 64 F. Supp. 632 (N.D. Ill. 1946)

Holding
- The remedy for unfairness in districting is to secure State legislatures that will apportion properly, or to invoke the ample powers of Congress. The Constitution has many commands that are not enforceable by courts, because they clearly fall outside the conditions and purposes that circumscribe judicial action.

Court membership
- Chief Justice vacant Associate Justices Hugo Black · Stanley F. Reed; Felix Frankfurter · William O. Douglas; Frank Murphy · Robert H. Jackson; Wiley B. Rutledge · Harold H. Burton

Case opinions
- Plurality: Frankfurter, joined by Reed, Burton
- Concurrence: Rutledge
- Dissent: Black, joined by Douglas, Murphy
- Jackson took no part in the consideration or decision of the case.

Laws applied
- U.S. Const. Art. I § 4
- Overruled by
- Baker v. Carr, 369 U.S. 186 (1962); Reynolds v. Sims, 377 U.S. 533 (1964)

Colegrove v. Green, 328 U.S. 549 (1946), was a United States Supreme Court case. Writing for a 4–3 plurality, Justice Felix Frankfurter held that the federal judiciary had no power to interfere with malapportioned Congressional districts. The Court held that the Elections Clause in Article I, section IV of the U.S. Constitution left to the legislature of each state the authority to establish the time, place, and manner of holding elections for Congressional Representatives, and that only Congress (and thus not the federal judiciary) could determine whether individual state legislatures had fulfilled their responsibility to secure fair representation for citizens.

However, in Baker v. Carr, 369 U.S. 186 (1962) the United States Supreme Court distinguished the Colegrove decision holding that malapportionment claims under the Equal Protection Clause of the Fourteenth Amendment were not exempt from judicial review under Article IV, Section 4, as the equal protection issue in this case was separate from any political questions.

The "one person, one vote" doctrine which requires electoral districts to be apportioned according to population, thus making each district roughly equal in population, was further cemented in the cases that followed Baker v. Carr, including Gray v. Sanders, 372 U.S. 368 (1963), which concerned state county districts; Reynolds v. Sims, 377 U.S. 533 (1964), which concerned state legislature districts; Wesberry v. Sanders, 376 U.S. 1 (1964), which concerned U.S. Congressional districts; and Avery v. Midland County, 390 U.S. 474 (1968), which concerned local government districts, a decision which was upheld in Board of Estimate of City of New York v. Morris, 489 U.S. 688 (1989).

== Ruling ==
Colegrove arose from the failure of Illinois to redistrict its Congressional delegation since 1901, despite internal migration that had left wide population disparities between various districts. Three voters sued, asserting what would now be known as malapportionment: a rural county of 1,000 and an urban county of 100,000 would have an equal vote.

The court characterized the case as "an appeal to the federal courts to reconstruct the electoral process of Illinois in order that it may be adequately represented in the councils of the Nation. Because the Illinois legislature has failed to revise its Congressional Representative districts in order to reflect great changes, during more than a generation, in the distribution of its population, we are asked to do this, as it were, for Illinois." The court decided that this was a nonjusticiable question: "The remedy for unfairness in districting is to secure State legislatures that will apportion properly, or to invoke the ample powers of Congress."

== Dissent by Justice Black ==
Dissenting, Justice Hugo Black argued that the Constitution required each citizen's vote carry equal weight. "While the Constitution contains no express provision requiring that congressional election districts established by the States must contain approximately equal populations," Black wrote, "the constitutionally guaranteed right to vote, and the right to have one's vote counted clearly imply the policy that state election systems, no matter what their form, should be designed to give approximately equal weight to each vote cast." Black thought it wrong that a citizen living in a district of 900,000 people had a much smaller percentage of a vote than someone living in a district with 112,000.

== Plurality opinion ==
The Colegrove case was decided by a 4–3 plurality. Plurality opinions result when a majority of Justices (usually five or more but in this rare occasion, four) agree on the result in a particular case but no single rationale or opinion garners five votes. The case was voted on by seven rather than nine justices because Chief Justice Stone had just died, and Justice Robert Jackson had taken leave to serve as chief prosecutor of the Nuremberg Trials.

== Aftermath ==
The plaintiff responded with a second suit demonstrating that the Illinois State Legislature districts were even more malapportioned than the Congressional districts. This second case arrived as appeal to the Supreme Court in Colegrove v. Barrett, 330 U.S. 804 (1947) for which Frankfurter was with the majority again issuing Per Curiam dismissal for want of a substantial federal question.

Critics of Colegrove complained that it deprived state citizens of federal remedies, and that the outdated apportionments – dating to 1901, 45 years prior – were the vehicle by which rural, conservative interests were allowed to keep a disproportionate influence over the country's politics. Until it was overruled by Baker, Colegrove made it almost impossible for citizens' groups to get help from the federal courts in apportioning legislative and congressional districts.

An exception to the reach of Colegrove was allowed in a 1960 case called Gomillion v. Lightfoot, in which the appellants showed that the boundary lines of a district in Alabama had deliberately been drawn to minimize the voting rights of black residents. Frankfurter wrote the opinion in this case as well, making sure that Colegrove would not be seen as allowing blatant racial gerrymandering by recasting the issue as a Fifteenth Amendment case.

One week after the Gomillion ruling was handed down, Justice Black persuaded his colleagues to hear arguments in Baker v. Carr, the case which would ultimately overrule Colegrove.

== See also ==
- One man, one vote
