= Shaff Plan =

Rejected amendment

The Shaff Plan was a proposed amendment to the Iowa Constitution, introduced by state legislator David Shaff. The amendment called for the Iowa Senate to be apportioned by population, and the Iowa House of Representatives to be apportioned by area. In December 1963, in a public referendum, the amendment was rejected.

In February 1964, Iowa passed two reapportionment bills. They would later be declared unconstitutional, as they did not provide for "one man, one vote", as required by the US Supreme Court decision in Reynolds v. Sims (1964).
