= Sterling Foster Black =

American lawyer and politician

Member of the New Mexico Senate
- In office 1960–1968

Personal details
- Born: September 12, 1924 Birmingham, Alabama, U.S.
- Died: May 20, 1996 (aged 71) Albuquerque, New Mexico, U.S.
- Party: Democratic
- Education: George Washington University; Dartmouth College; University of Arizona; Columbia University

Sterling Foster Black (September 12, 1924 – May 20, 1996) was an American lawyer and politician who served as a Democratic state senator in the New Mexico Senate in the 1960s.

== Biography ==
Born in Birmingham, Alabama, Black was the son of United States Supreme Court Associate Justice Hugo Black. Black served in the United States Army during World War II. Black went to George Washington University, Dartmouth College, and the University of Arizona. He received his law degree from Columbia Law School. Black was also in the title insurance business in Los Alamos, New Mexico. He was a lawyer and had worked for the United States Atomic Energy Commission in Los Alamos, New Mexico. Black served in the New Mexico State Senate from 1960 to 1968 as a Democrat. He was an outspoken critic of United States involvement in the Vietnam War, and served as the New Mexico state chairman of peace candidate Eugene McCarthy's presidential campaign. Black died from cancer at his home in Albuquerque, New Mexico.
