= Wesberry v. Sanders =

1964 United States Supreme Court case on congressional districts

- Supreme Court of the United States

Argued November 18, 1963 Decided February 17, 1964
- Full case name: James P. Wesberry, Jr. et al. v. Carl E. Sanders et al.
- Citations: 376 U.S. 1 (more) 84 S. Ct. 526; 11 L. Ed. 2d 481

Case history
- Prior: Wesberry v. Vandiver, 206 F. Supp. 276 (N.D. Ga. 1962), prob. juris. noted, 374 U.S. 802 (1963).

Holding
- The Constitution requires that members of the House of Representatives be selected by districts composed, as nearly as is practicable, of equal population.

Court membership
- Chief Justice Earl Warren Associate Justices Hugo Black · William O. Douglas; Tom C. Clark · John M. Harlan II; William J. Brennan Jr. · Potter Stewart; Byron White · Arthur Goldberg

Case opinions
- Majority: Black, joined by Warren, Douglas, Brennan, White, Goldberg
- Concur/dissent: Clark
- Dissent: Harlan, joined by Stewart (in part)

Laws applied
- U.S. Const., art. I, § 2.
- This case overturned a previous ruling or rulings
- Colegrove v. Green, 328 U.S. 549 (1946)

Wesberry v. Sanders, 376 U.S. 1 (1964), was a landmark U.S. Supreme Court case in which the Court ruled that districts in the United States House of Representatives must be approximately equal in population. Along with Baker v. Carr (1962) and Reynolds v. Sims (1964), it was part of a series of Warren Court cases that applied the principle of "one person, one vote" to U.S. legislative bodies.

Article One of the United States Constitution requires members of the U.S. House of Representatives to be apportioned by population among the states, but it does not specify exactly how the representatives from each state should be elected. The case arose from a challenge to the unequal population of congressional districts in the state of Georgia.

In his majority opinion, which was joined by five other justices, Associate Justice Hugo Black held that Article One required that "as nearly as practicable one man's vote in a congressional election is to be worth as much as another's." The decision had a major impact on representation in the House, as many states had districts of unequal population, often to the detriment of urban voters. The United States Senate was unaffected by the decision since the Constitution explicitly grants each state two senators representing the state at large.

== Decision ==
No right is more precious in a free country than that of having a voice in the election of those who make the laws under which, as good citizens, we must live. Other rights, even the most basic, are illusory if the right to vote is undermined. Our Constitution leaves no room for classification of people in a way that unnecessarily abridges this right.

— Justice Hugo Black on the right to vote as the foundation of democracy in Wesberry v. Sanders (1964).

Writing for the Court majority in Wesberry, Justice Black argued that a reading of the debates of the Constitutional Convention demonstrated conclusively that the Framers had meant, in using the phrase “by the People,” to guarantee equality of representation in the election of Members of the House of Representatives.

== Dissent ==
Writing in dissent, Associate Justice John Marshall Harlan II argued that the statements cited by Justice Black had uniformly been in the context of the Great Compromise. Justice Harlan further argued that the Convention debates were clear to the effect that Article I, § 4, had vested exclusive control over state districting practices in Congress and that the Court action overrode a congressional decision not to require equally populated districts.

== See also ==
- Baker v. Carr, 369 U.S. 186 (1962): Redistricting qualifies as a justiciable question, thus enabling federal courts to hear redistricting cases.
- Reynolds v. Sims, 377 U.S. 533 (1964): Districts in State Legislatures must be approximately equal in population.
- Thornburg v. Gingles, 478 U.S. 30 (1986): State Legislative multimember district invalid where three criteria met such that "...a bloc voting majority must usually be able to defeat candidates supported by a politically cohesive, geographically insular minority group."
- Miller v. Johnson, 515 U.S. 900 (1995):
- Alabama Legislative Black Caucus v. Alabama, 575 U.S. ___ (2015): Racial gerrymandering claims must be considered district-by-district, rather than by looking at the state as an undifferentiated whole.
- List of United States Supreme Court cases, volume 376
- One Person, One Vote
