= Gomillion v. Lightfoot =

- Supreme Court of the United States

Argued October 18–19, 1960 Decided November 14, 1960
- Full case name: Gomillion et al. v. Lightfoot, Mayor of Tuskegee, et al.
- Citations: 364 U.S. 339 (more) 81 S. Ct. 125; 5 L. Ed. 2d 110

Case history
- Prior: 167 F. Supp. 405 (M.D. Ala. 1958); affirmed, 270 F.2d 594 (5th Cir. 1959).

Holding
- Electoral district boundaries drawn only to disenfranchise blacks violate the Fifteenth Amendment.

Court membership
- Chief Justice Earl Warren Associate Justices Hugo Black · Felix Frankfurter; William O. Douglas · Tom C. Clark; John M. Harlan II · William J. Brennan Jr. Charles E. Whittaker · Potter Stewart

Case opinions
- Majority: Frankfurter, joined by Warren, Black, Douglas, Clark, Harlan, Brennan, Stewart
- Concurrence: Whittaker

Laws applied
- U.S. Const. amend. XV

Gomillion v. Lightfoot, 364 U.S. 339 (1960), is a landmark decision of the Supreme Court of the United States that found an electoral district with boundaries created to disenfranchise African Americans violated the Fifteenth Amendment.

== Background ==
After passage of the Civil Rights Act of 1957, activists in the city of Tuskegee, Alabama, had been slowly making progress in registering African-American voters, whose numbers on the rolls began to approach those of registered white voters. The city was the location of the Tuskegee Institute, a historically black college, and a large Veterans Administration hospital, both staffed entirely by African Americans.

African Americans outnumbered whites in the city by a four-to-one margin, and whites wanted to block the likelihood of being governed by the black majority. White residents lobbied the Alabama legislature to redefine the boundaries of the city. In 1957, without debate and ignoring African-American protests, the legislature enacted Local Law 140, which created a 28-sided city boundary that excluded nearly all black voters from the redefined city, but no whites. The act was written by state senator Samuel Martin Engelhardt Jr., who was executive secretary of the White Citizens' Council of Alabama and a white supremacist. African Americans protested, led by Charles G. Gomillion, a professor at Tuskegee, and community activists mounted a boycott against white-owned businesses in the city. Gomillion and others filed suit against the city mayor and other officials, claiming that the act's purpose was discriminatory under the Fourteenth Amendment's due process and Equal Protection Clause.

Judge Frank M. Johnson dismissed the case, ruling that the state had the right to draw boundaries of election districts and jurisdictions. That ruling was upheld by the Court of Appeals for the Fifth Circuit in New Orleans.

Booker T. Washington had promoted blacks advancing by education and self-improvement, with the expectation of being accepted by whites when they showed they were "deserving". At the time of the U.S. Supreme Court hearing of this case, journalist Bernard Taper wrote,

Since the gerrymander was designed to defeat municipal suffrage rights of the highly "deserving" members of the Institute and the hospital staff, Session Law 140 has demonstrated, perhaps more than other symbols of Southern prejudice, the invalidity of Booker T. Washington's advice.

The redrawing of the city boundaries had the "unintended effect of uniting Tuskegee Institute's African-American intellectuals with the less educated blacks living outside the sphere of the school. Some members of the school's faculty realized that possessing advanced degrees ultimately provided them no different status among the city's white establishment".

Gomillion and his attorneys appealed the case to the U.S. Supreme Court. The case was argued by Fred Gray, an Alabama civil rights attorney, and Robert L. Carter, lead counsel for the National Association for the Advancement of Colored People, with assistance from Arthur D. Shores. The defense was led by James J. Carter.

== Decision ==
Justice Frankfurter issued the opinion of the Court, which held that the Act violated the provision of the 15th Amendment prohibiting states from denying anyone their right to vote "on account of race, color, or previous condition of servitude".

Justice Whittaker concurred but said that he believed the law should have been struck down under the Equal Protection Clause of the Fourteenth Amendment, not the 15th Amendment. According to Whittaker, just because someone has been redistricted to vote in another district does not automatically mean his rights have been denied; it is not a right to vote in a particular jurisdiction. But in this case, completely fencing African-American citizens out of a district is an unlawful segregation of black citizens and a clear violation of the Equal Protection Clause.

== Subsequent history ==
"The case showed that all state powers were subject to limitations imposed by the U.S. Constitution; therefore, states were not insulated from federal judicial review when they jeopardized federally protected rights." The case was returned to the lower court; in 1961, under the direction of Judge Johnson, the gerrymandering was reversed and the original map of the city was reinstituted.

In the controversial case Mobile v. Bolden (1980) the court held that 14th amendment voting dilution claims require purposeful discrimination. According to the Court opinion in Mobile, Gaffney v. Cummings interpreted voting dilution cases like White v. Regester and Gomillion as requiring intent:

A districting statute otherwise acceptable, may be invalid because it fences out a racial group so as to deprive them of their pre-existing municipal vote. Gomillion v. Lightfoot, 364 U.S. 339 (1960). A districting plan may create multimember districts perfectly acceptable under equal population standards, but invidiously discriminatory because they are employed 'to minimize or cancel out the voting strength of racial or political elements of the voting population.

After the Mobile decision held that claims under §2 of the Voting Rights Act of 1965 required intent because the 15th amendment cases required it, an effects standard was added by the 1982 Amendments to the Voting Rights Act allowing plaintiffs to establish a §2 violation if they could prove that the standard, practice, or procedure being challenged had the result of denying a racial or language minority an equal opportunity to participate in the political process.

== See also ==
- Gerrymandering
- Hunt v. Cromartie 526 U.S. 541 (1999)
- Baker v. Carr 369 U.S. 186 (1962)
- List of United States Supreme Court cases, volume 364
- Civil Rights Cases
- Brown v. Board of Education of Topeka (347 U.S. 483 (1954))
- Timeline of the civil rights movement
