= One man, one vote =

Political slogan

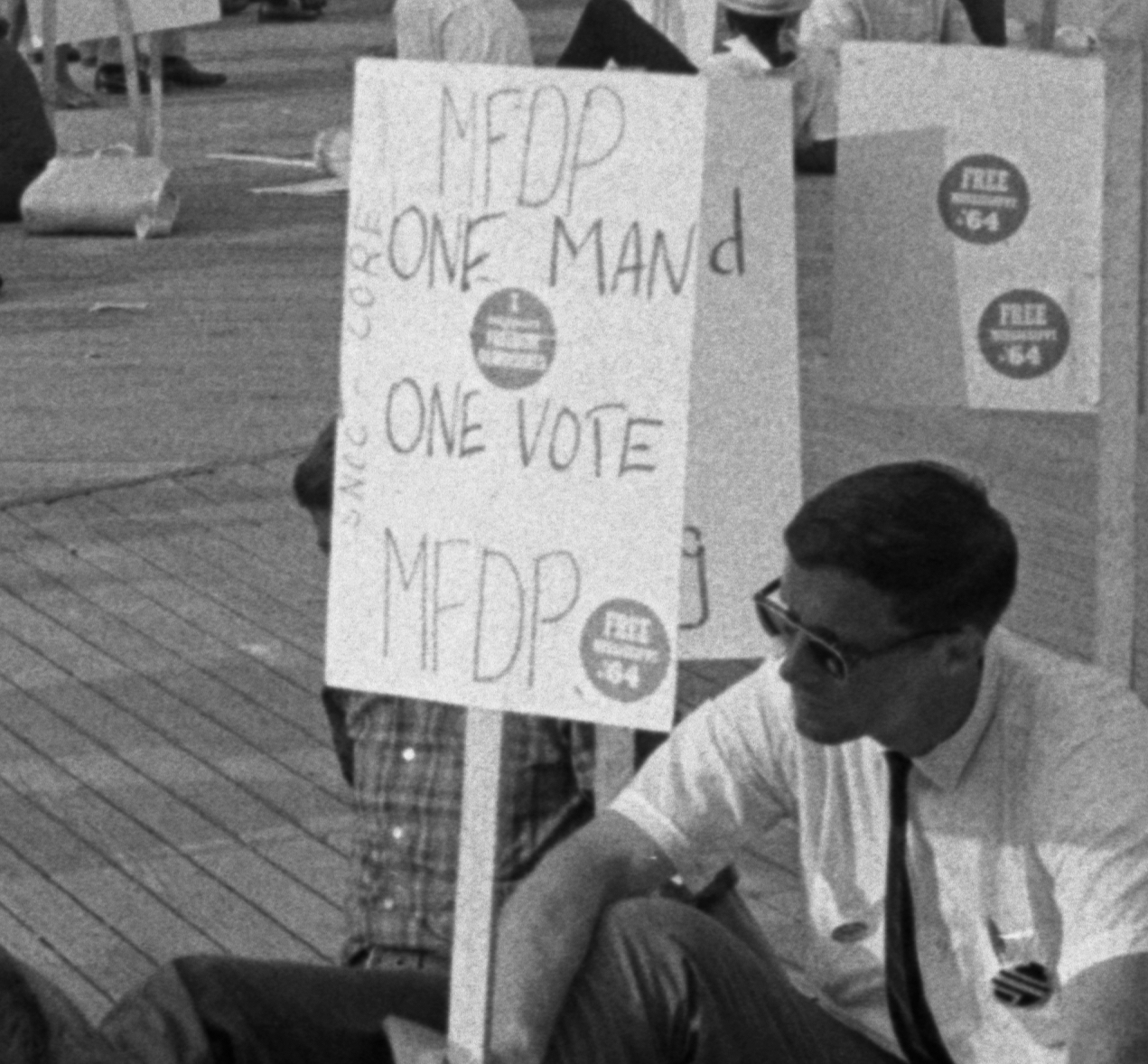
"One Man One Vote" protest at the 1964 Democratic National Convention in Atlantic City, New Jersey when delegates of the Mississippi Freedom Democratic Party attempted to be seated; they had been excluded from the regular Democratic Party of the state and general voting by Mississippi's racial segregation and discriminatory voter registration practices.

"One man, one vote" (Note: Also "one person, one vote" or—in the context of primaries and leadership elections— "one member, one vote".) or "one vote, one value" is a slogan used to advocate for the principle of equal representation in voting. This slogan is used by advocates of democracy and political equality, especially with regard to electoral reforms like universal suffrage, direct elections, and proportional representation.

== History ==
The phrase surged in English-language usage around 1880, thanks in part to British trade unionist George Howell, who used the phrase "one man, one vote" in political pamphlets. During the mid-to-late 20th-century period of decolonisation and the struggles for national sovereignty, this phrase became widely used in developing countries where majority populations sought to gain political power in proportion to their numbers. The slogan was notably used by the anti-apartheid movement during the 1980s, which sought to end white minority rule in South Africa. (Note: Attributed to multiple sources:)

In the United States, the "one person, one vote" principle was invoked in a series of cases by the Warren Court in the 1960s during the height of related civil rights activities. (Note: Attributed to multiple sources:) (Note: Justice Douglas, Gray v. Sanders (1963): "The conception of political equality from the Declaration of Independence, to Lincoln's Gettysburg Address, to the Fifteenth, Seventeenth, and Nineteenth Amendments can mean only one thing—one person, one vote.")

By the second half of the 20th century, many states had neglected to redistrict for decades, because their legislatures were dominated by rural interests. But during the 20th century, population had increased in urban, industrialized areas. In addition to applying the Equal Protection Clause of the constitution, the U.S. Supreme Court majority opinion (8–1) led by Chief Justice Earl Warren in Reynolds v. Sims (1964) ruled that state legislatures, unlike the U.S. Congress, needed to have representation in both houses that was based on districts containing roughly equal populations, with redistricting as needed after the decennial censuses. Some states had established an upper house based on an equal number of representatives to be elected from each county, modelled after the US Senate. Because of changes following industrialization and urbanization, most population growth had been in cities, and the bicameral state legislatures gave undue political power to rural counties. In the 1964 Wesberry v. Sanders decision, the U.S. Supreme Court declared that equality of voting—one person, one vote—means that "the weight and worth of the citizens' votes as nearly as is practicable must be the same". They ruled that states must draw federal congressional districts containing roughly equal represented populations.

=== United Kingdom ===
==== Historical background ====
This phrase was traditionally used in the context of demands for suffrage reform. Historically the emphasis within the House of Commons was on representing areas: counties, boroughs and, later, universities. The entitlement to vote for the Members of Parliament representing the constituencies varied widely, with different qualifications over time, such as owning property of a certain value, holding an apprenticeship, qualifying for paying the local-government rates, or holding a degree from the university in question. Those who qualified for the vote in more than one constituency were entitled to vote in each constituency, while many adults did not qualify for the vote at all. Plural voting was also present in local government, whereby the owners of business property qualified for votes in the relevant wards.

Reformers argued that Members of Parliament and other elected officials should represent citizens equally, and that each voter should be entitled to exercise the vote once in an election. Successive Reform Acts by 1950 had both extended the franchise eventually to almost all adult citizens (barring convicts, lunatics and members of the House of Lords), and also reduced and finally eliminated plural voting for Westminster elections. Plural voting for local-government elections outside the City of London was not abolished until the Representation of the People Act 1969.

==== Northern Ireland ====
When Northern Ireland was established in 1921, it adopted the same political system then in place for the Westminster Parliament and British local government. But the Parliament of Northern Ireland did not follow Westminster in changes to the franchise from 1945. As a result, into the 1960s, plural voting was still allowed not only for local government (as it was for local government in Great Britain), but also for the Parliament of Northern Ireland. This meant that in local council elections (as in Great Britain), ratepayers and their spouses, whether renting or owning the property, could vote, and company directors had an extra vote by virtue of their company's status. However, unlike the situation in Great Britain, non-ratepayers did not have a vote in local government elections. The franchise for elections to the Parliament of Northern Ireland had been extended in 1928 to all adult citizens who were not disqualified, at the same time as the franchise for elections to Westminster. But, university representation and the business vote continued for elections to the House of Commons of Northern Ireland until 1969. They were abolished in 1948 for elections to the UK House of Commons (including Westminster seats in Northern Ireland). Historians and political scholars have debated the extent to which the franchise for local government contributed to unionist electoral success in controlling councils in nationalist-majority areas.

Based on a number of inequities, the Northern Ireland Civil Rights Association was founded in 1967. It had five primary demands, and added the demand that each citizen in Northern Ireland be afforded the same number of votes for local government elections (as stated above, this was not yet the case anywhere in the United Kingdom). The slogan "one man, one vote" became a rallying cry for this campaign. The Parliament of Northern Ireland voted to update the voting rules for elections to the Northern Ireland House of Commons, which were implemented for the 1969 Northern Ireland general election, and for local government elections, which was done by the Electoral Law Act (Northern Ireland) 1969, passed on 25 November 1969.

=== United States ===
==== Historical background ====
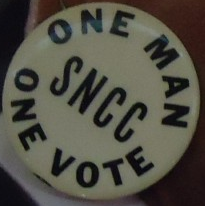
"One man, one vote" emblem (Student Non-Violent Coordinating Committee (SNCC – New Jersey)

The United States Constitution requires a decennial census for the purpose of assuring fair apportionment of seats in the United States House of Representatives among the states, based on their population. Reapportionment has generally been conducted without incident with the exception of the reapportionment that should have followed the 1920 census, which was effectively skipped pending resolution by the Reapportionment Act of 1929. State legislatures, however, initially established election of congressional representatives from districts that were often based on traditional counties or parishes that had preceded founding of the new government. The question then arose as to whether the legislatures were required to ensure that House districts were roughly equal in population and to draw new districts to accommodate demographic changes.

Some U.S. states redrew their House districts every ten years to reflect changes in population patterns; many did not. Some never redrew them, except when it was mandated by reapportionment of Congress and a resulting change in the number of seats to which that state was entitled in the House of Representatives. In many states, both North and South, this inaction resulted in a skewing of influence for voters in some districts over those in others, generally with a bias toward rural districts. For example, if the 2nd congressional district eventually had a population of 1.5 million, but the 3rd had only 500,000, then, in effect – since each district elected the same number of representatives – a voter in the 3rd district had three times the voting power of a 2nd-district voter.

Alabama's state legislature resisted redistricting from 1910 to 1972 (when forced by federal court order). As a result, rural residents retained a wildly disproportionate amount of power in a time when other areas of the state became urbanized and industrialized, attracting greater populations. Such urban areas were under-represented in the state legislature and underserved; their residents had difficulty getting needed funding for infrastructure and services. Such areas paid far more in taxes to the state than they received in benefits in relation to the population.

The Constitution incorporates the result of the Great Compromise, which established representation for the U.S. Senate. Each state was equally represented in the Senate with two representatives, without regard to population. For this reason, "one person, one vote" has never been implemented in the U.S. Senate, in terms of representation by states. Various reforms to the Senate have been proposed to fix this error.

When states established their legislatures, they often adopted a bicameral model based on colonial governments or the federal government. Many copied the Senate principle, establishing an upper house based on geography – for instance, a state senate with one representative drawn from each county. By the 20th century, this often resulted in state senators having widely varying amounts of political power, with ones from rural areas having votes equal in power to those of senators representing much greater urban populations.

Activism in the Civil Rights Movement to restore the ability of African Americans in the South to register and vote highlighted other voting inequities across the country. In 1964–1965, the Civil Rights Act of 1964 and Voting Rights Act of 1965 were passed, in part to enforce the constitutional voting rights of African Americans. Numerous court challenges were raised, including in Alabama, to correct the decades in which state legislative districts had not been redefined or reapportioned, resulting in lack of representation for many residents.

==== Court cases ====
In Colegrove v. Green, 328 U.S. 549 (1946) the United States Supreme Court held in a 4–3 plurality decision that Article I, Section 4 left to the legislature of each state the authority to establish the time, place, and manner of holding elections for representatives.

However, in Baker v. Carr, 369 U.S. 186 (1962) the United States Supreme Court under Chief Justice Earl Warren overturned the previous decision in Colegrove holding that malapportionment claims under the Equal Protection Clause of the Fourteenth Amendment were not exempt from judicial review under Article IV, Section 4, as the equal protection issue in this case was separate from any political questions. The "one person, one vote" doctrine, which requires electoral districts to be apportioned according to population, thus making each district roughly equal in population, was further affirmed by the Warren Court in the landmark cases that followed Baker, including Gray v. Sanders, 372 U.S. 368 (1963), which concerned the county unit system in Georgia; Reynolds v. Sims, 377 U.S. 533 (1964) which concerned state legislature districts (decided together with WMCA, Inc. v. Lomenzo); Wesberry v. Sanders, 376 U.S. 1 (1964), which concerned U.S. congressional districts; and Avery v. Midland County, 390 U.S. 474 (1968) which concerned local government districts. (Note: Attributed to multiple sources:)

The Warren Court's decision was upheld in Board of Estimate of City of New York v. Morris, 489 U.S. 688 (1989). Evenwel v. Abbott, 578 U.S. 2016, said states may use total population in drawing districts.

==== Other uses ====
- The slogan "one man, one vote" has occasionally been misunderstood as requiring plurality voting; however, court cases in the United States have consistently ruled against this interpretation the admissibility of other rules.
  - The constitutionality of non-plurality systems has subsequently been upheld by several federal courts, against challenges. In 2018, a federal court ruled on the constitutionality of Maine's use of ranked-choice voting, stating that "'one person, one vote' does not stand in opposition to ranked voting so long as all electors are treated equally at the ballot."
  - In 1975, a Michigan state court clarified that one-man, one-vote does not mandate plurality vote, and upheld instant-runoff voting as permitted by the state constitution.
- Training Wheels for Citizenship, a failed 2004 initiative in California, attempted to give minors between 14 and 17 years of age (who otherwise cannot vote) a fractional vote in state elections. Among the criticisms leveled at the proposed initiative was that it violated the "one man, one vote" principle.
- Courts have established that special-purpose districts must also follow the one person, one vote rule. (Note: Attributed to multiple sources:)
- Due to treaties signed by the United States in 1830 and 1835, two Native American tribes (the Cherokee and Choctaw) each hold the right to a non-voting delegate position in the House of Representatives. As of 2019, only the Cherokee have attempted to exercise that right. Because all tribal governments related to the two in question exist within present-day state boundaries, it has been suggested that such an arrangement could potentially violate the "one man, one vote" principle by granting a "super-vote"; a Cherokee or Choctaw voter would theoretically have two House representatives (state and tribal), whereas any other American would only have one. (The existence of a high level of wasted votes under either system might mean that in fact the Cherokee voter might have helped to elect neither of his ostensible representatives.)

=== Australia ===
In Australia, one vote, one value is a democratic principle, applied in electoral laws governing redistributions of electoral divisions of the House of Representatives. The principle calls for all electoral divisions to have the same number of enrolled voters (not residents or population), within a specified percentage of variance. The electoral laws of the federal House of Representatives, and of the state and territory parliaments, follow the principle, with a few exceptions. The principle does not apply to the Senate because, under the Australian constitution, each state is entitled to the same number of senators, irrespective of the population of the state.

==== Malapportionment ====
Currently, for the House of Representatives, the number of enrolled voters in each division in a state or territory can vary by up to 10% from the average quota for the state or territory, and the number of voters can vary by up to 3.5% from the average projected enrolment three-and-a-half years into the future. The allowable quota variation of the number of electors in each division was reduced from 20% to 10% by the Commonwealth Electoral Act (No. 2) 1973, passed at the joint sitting of Parliament in 1974. The change was instigated by the Whitlam Labor government.

However, for various reasons, such as the constitutional requirement that Tasmania must have at least five lower house members, larger seats like Cowper (New South Wales) have almost double the electors of smaller seats like Solomon in the Northern Territory.

Historically, all states (other than Tasmania) have had some form of malapportionment, but electoral reform in recent decades has resulted in electoral legislation and policy frameworks based on the "one vote, one value" principle. However, in the Western Australian and Queensland Legislative Assemblies, seats covering areas greater than 100,000 square kilometres (38,600 sq mi) may have fewer electors than the general tolerance would otherwise allow.

The following chart documents the years that the upper and lower houses of each Australian state parliament replaced malapportionment with the 'one vote, one value' principle.

State	NSW	Qld	SA	Tas	Vic	WA
Upper House	1978	Abolished in 1922	1973	1995	1982	2021
Lower House	1979	1991	1975	1906	1982	2005

==== Proposed constitutional amendment ====
The Whitlam Labor government proposed to amend the Constitution in a referendum in 1974 to require the use of population to determine the size of electorates rather than alternative methods of distributing seats, such as geographical size. The bill was not passed by the Senate and instead the referendum was put to voters using the deadlock provision in Section 128. The referendum was not carried, obtaining a majority in just one State and achieving 47.20% support, an overall minority of 407,398 votes. (Note: Handbook of the 44th Parliament (2014) "Part 5 – Referendums and Plebiscites – Referendum results". Parliamentary Library of Australia.)

In 1988, the Hawke Labor government submitted a referendum proposal to enshrine the principle in the Australian Constitution. The referendum question came about due to the widespread malapportionment and gerrymandering which was endemic during Joh Bjelke-Petersen's term as the Queensland Premier. The proposal was opposed by both the Liberal Party of Australia and the National Party of Australia. The referendum proposal was not carried, obtaining a majority in no States and achieving just 37.6% support, an overall minority of 2,335,741.

=== Germany ===
The Federal Constitutional Court in Germany ruled that the overhang mandates at the time violated the principle of equal voting rights, as they assigned some voters a negative voting weight.

== Measurement ==
The violation of equal representation on the seats-to-votes ratio when comparing party to party in elections can be measured with the Gallagher index (used often in the context of proportional representation) or the efficiency gap (used commonly in context of two-party systems and First-past-the-post voting). (Note: Attributed to multiple sources:)

== Exceptions ==
Disfranchisement can cause no voting rights for some persons. Multiple citizenship or non-citizen suffrage can result in multiple votes per person.

== See also ==
- Democracy Index
- Democratization
- Electoral college
- Anonymity (social choice)
- Proportional representation
- Universal suffrage
