= Karcher v. Daggett =

- Supreme Court of the United States

Argued March 2, 1983 Decided June 22, 1983
- Full case name: Karcher, Speaker, New Jersey Assembly, et al. v. Daggett, et al.
- Citations: 462 U.S. 725 (more) 103 S. Ct. 2653; 77 L. Ed. 2d 133; 1983 U.S. LEXIS 75; 51 U.S.L.W. 4853

Case history
- Prior: Appeal from the United States District Court for the District of New Jersey

Holding
- New Jersey's plan may not be regarded per se as the product of a good faith effort to achieve population equality merely because the maximum population deviation among districts is smaller than the predictable undercount in available census data.

Court membership
- Chief Justice Warren E. Burger Associate Justices William J. Brennan Jr. · Byron White; Thurgood Marshall · Harry Blackmun; Lewis F. Powell Jr. · William Rehnquist; John P. Stevens · Sandra Day O'Connor

Case opinions
- Majority: Brennan, joined by Marshall, Blackmun, Stevens, O'Connor
- Concurrence: Stevens
- Dissent: White, joined by Burger, Powell, Rehnquist
- Dissent: Powell

Laws applied
- U.S. Const. Art. 1 § 2

Karcher v. Daggett, 462 U.S. 725 (1983), was a United States Supreme Court case involving the legality of redistricting, and possibly gerrymandering, in the state of New Jersey.

== Background ==
The New Jersey Legislature adopted a redistricting plan which resulted in a one percent population difference between the largest and smallest districts. Several citizens came forward and challenged the legislation, claiming it violated Article I, Section 2 of the Constitution. The district court ruled in favor of the plaintiffs and determined the law to be unconstitutional. The defendants appealed to the Supreme Court.

The "equal representation" standard of Article I, Section 2 requires districts to be apportioned to population equality to the closest possible degree. The population differences here could have been avoided with a good faith effort to achieve population equality. The Court found that the defendants did not meet their burden of proving that the deviations in their plan were necessary to achieve a consistent, nondiscriminatory redistricting. The State had to prove specifically how and why the specific deviations of its plan were for an objective to benefit the system. The defendant tried to prove that the justification for the high deviations was to preserve voting strength of minority groups. However, the court believed that the state could not prove that the population disparities preserved the voting strength of these minority groups.

== Opinion of the Court ==
The Supreme Court upheld the district court's decision based on the plaintiffs' evidence of districts not drawn in "good faith," and the state's failure to offer a legitimate reason for the population deviations exceeding minimum possible as required by Article I, section 2 of the Constitution. The dissenters thought that the population deviations—which were less than the margin of error for the census itself—was not the appropriate grounds for the holding and asserted that the districts should be ruled unconstitutional as a blatant political gerrymander. Justice Stevens's concurring 5th vote held both grounds were valid. The State was compelled to enact a new redistricting plan that followed smaller population deviations of district size. Of note, precisely the same Court ruled political gerrymanders were justiciable three years later in Davis v. Bandemer.

== Analysis ==
The case is usually cited for its holding that there is no de minimis deviation for population inequality between districts, and that all deviations must be justified by a legitimate governmental interest (such as geographic features or preserving communities-of-interest). However, the case is the earliest Court rejection of a political gerrymander—though Justice Brennan's approach does not require holding on those grounds. In addition, the case is a prime example of the tie between the McDonnell-Douglas burden-shifting framework and redistricting law.
