= Gray v. Sanders =

- Supreme Court of the United States

Argued January 17, 1963 Decided March 18, 1963
- Full case name: Gray, Chairman of the Georgia State Democratic Executive Committee, et al. v. Sanders
- Citations: 372 U.S. 368 (more) 83 S. Ct. 801; 9 L. Ed. 2d 821; 1963 U.S. LEXIS 1944

Case history
- Prior: Appeal from the United States District Court for the Northern District of Georgia.
- Subsequent: 203 F. Supp. 158 (N.D. Ga. 1962), judgment vacated and case remanded.

Holding
- State elections must adhere to the "one person, one vote" principle.

Court membership
- Chief Justice Earl Warren Associate Justices Hugo Black · William O. Douglas; Tom C. Clark · John M. Harlan II; William J. Brennan Jr. · Potter Stewart; Byron White · Arthur Goldberg

Case opinions
- Majority: Douglas, joined by Warren, Black, Clark, Brennan, Stewart, White, Goldberg
- Concurrence: Stewart, joined by Clark
- Dissent: Harlan

Laws applied
- U.S. Const. amend. XIV
- This case overturned a previous ruling or rulings
- Colegrove v. Green, 328 U.S. 549 (1946)

Gray v. Sanders, 372 U.S. 368 (1963), was a Supreme Court of the United States case dealing with equal representation in regard to the American election system and formulated the famous "one person, one vote" standard applied in this case for "counting votes in a Democratic primary election for the nomination of a United States Senator and statewide officers — which was practically equivalent to election."

== Background ==
James O'Hear Sanders, a businessman and voter in Fulton County, Georgia, brought a lawsuit which challenged the legality of the County Unit System. The suit, Sanders v. Gray, was filed in the U.S. District Court for the Northern District of Georgia. James H. Gray, the chairman of the State Executive Committee of the Democratic Party, was one of the named defendants as the suit focused on the Democratic party primary elections which usually determined the selection of Georgia officeholders.

Sanders argued that the County Unit System gave unequal and preferential voting power to smaller counties. Rural counties, which accounted for one-third of Georgia's population, accounted for a majority of County Unit votes. Fulton County had 14.11% of Georgia's population at that time, but only 1.46% (6 unit votes) of the 410 Unit Votes. Echols County, Georgia, the smallest county in Georgia at the time, had 1,876 people or .05% of the state's population and .48% (1 unit vote) of the unit system. The system gave votes to Fulton County at a proportion of one-tenth the county population while giving Echols County a vote which was 10 times the population of the county.

In the Northern District of Georgia, Sanders v. Gray was heard by judges Elbert Tuttle, Griffin Bell, and Frank Arthur Hooper.

The Supreme Court granted certiorari in this case despite having refused to hear previous challenges to the Unit System. Robert F. Kennedy, as attorney general, argued for the United States at oral argument.

== The court's decision ==
By a vote of 8 to 1, the court struck down the County Unit System. Justice William O. Douglas wrote the majority opinion and said "The concept of political equality...can mean only one thing—one person, one vote". The court found that the separation of voters in the same election into different classes was a violation of the 14th Amendment's guarantee of equal protection. Justice John Marshall Harlan II dissented, suggesting the case be sent back for retrial, which would have investigated the constitutional requirements for legislative districts.

== Aftermath ==
Georgia had the option of modifying the County Unit System to make it more equal, but instead the state decided to move to using the popular vote in primary elections.

== See also ==
- List of United States Supreme Court cases, volume 372
- One Person, One Vote
