= Reynolds v. Sims =

Landmark U.S. Supreme Court case

- Supreme Court of the United States

Argued November, 1963 Decided June 15, 1964
- Full case name: Reynolds, Judge, et al. v. Sims, et al.
- Citations: 377 U.S. 533 (more) 84 S. Ct. 1362; 12 L. Ed. 2d 506; 1964 U.S. LEXIS 1002
- Argument: Oral argument

Case history
- Prior: Appeal from the United States District Court for the Middle District of Alabama

Holding
- State senate districts must have roughly equal populations based on the principle of "one person, one vote".

Court membership
- Chief Justice Earl Warren Associate Justices Hugo Black · William O. Douglas; Tom C. Clark · John M. Harlan II; William J. Brennan Jr. · Potter Stewart; Byron White · Arthur Goldberg

Case opinions
- Majority: Warren, joined by Black, Douglas, Brennan, White, Goldberg
- Concurrence: Clark
- Concurrence: Stewart
- Dissent: Harlan

Laws applied
- U.S. Const. amend. XIV (Equal Protection Clause)
- This case overturned a previous ruling or rulings
- Colegrove v. Green, 328 U.S. 549 (1946) (in part)

Reynolds v. Sims, 377 U.S. 533 (1964), was a landmark United States Supreme Court case in which the Court ruled that the single-seat electoral districts of state legislative chambers must be roughly equal in population. Along with Baker v. Carr (1962) and Wesberry v. Sanders (1964), it was part of a series of Warren Court cases that applied the principle of "one man, one vote" to U.S. legislative bodies.

Prior to the case, numerous state legislative chambers had districts containing unequal populations; for example, in the Nevada Senate, the smallest district had 568 people, while the largest had approximately 127,000 people. Some states refused to engage in regular redistricting, while others enshrined county by county representation (like the U.S. constitution does with state by state representation) in their constitutions. The case of Reynolds v. Sims arose after voters in Birmingham, Alabama, challenged the apportionment of the Alabama Legislature; although the Constitution of Alabama provided for both houses to be apportioned on the basis of population (a requirement that could not be changed by constitutional amendment), the Alabama Legislature failed to conduct the required periodic redistricting and even proposed a constitutional amendment which – in violation of the constitution's eternity clause – would provide for one state senator per county regardless of population differences.

In a majority opinion joined by five other justices, Chief Justice Earl Warren ruled that the Fourteenth Amendment's Equal Protection Clause requires states to establish state legislative electoral districts roughly equal in population. Warren held that "legislators represent people, not trees or acres. Legislators are elected by voters, not farms or cities or economic interests." In a concurring opinion, Associate Justice Tom Campbell Clark allowed one house to deviate from this standard only as long as the other house complies with it, while in his dissenting opinion, Associate Justice John Marshall Harlan II argued that the Equal Protection Clause was not designed to apply to voting rights. The decision had a major impact on state legislatures, as many states had to change their system of representation.

== Historical background ==
Before the industrialization and urbanization of the United States, a state senate in most states was understood to represent rural counties as a counterbalance to towns and cities. Of the forty-eight states then in the Union, only seven (Note: These being New Jersey, Massachusetts, New Hampshire (lower house only), Maine, South Dakota, Montana and Nevada (lower house only)) twice redistricted even one chamber of their legislature following both the 1930 and the 1940 Censuses. Illinois did not redistrict between 1910 and 1955, while Alabama and Tennessee had at the time of Reynolds not redistricted since 1901. In Connecticut, Vermont, Mississippi, and Delaware, apportionment was fixed by the states' constitutions, which, when written in the late eighteenth or nineteenth centuries, did not foresee the possibility of rural depopulation as was to occur during the first half of the century.

Among the more extreme pre-Reynolds disparities claimed by Morris K. Udall:

- In the Connecticut General Assembly, one House district had 191 people.
- In the New Hampshire General Court, the Town of Ellsworth with a population of three people had a Representative in the lower house; this was the same representation given to Bedford, with a population of 3,636.
- In the Utah State Legislature, the smallest district had 165 people, the largest 32,380.
- In the Vermont General Assembly, the smallest district had 36 people, the largest 35,000.
- In the Idaho Senate, the smallest district had 969 people; the largest, 93,400.
- In the Nevada Senate, seventeen members represented as many as 127,000 or as few as 568 people.

Having already overturned its ruling that redistricting was a purely political question in Baker v. Carr, 369 U.S. 186 (1962), the Court ruled to correct what it considered egregious examples of malapportionment; these were serious enough to undermine the premises underlying republican government. Before Reynolds, urban counties nationwide often had total representations similar to rural counties, and in Florida, there was a limit to three representatives even for the most populous counties.

== Procedural history ==
Voters from Jefferson County, Alabama, home to the state's largest city of Birmingham, challenged the apportionment of the Alabama Legislature. The Alabama Constitution paradoxically provided that, although senatorial districts have to have as equal a population as possible, counties cannot be split across several senatorial districts. Ratio variances as great as 41 to 1 from one senatorial district to another existed in the Alabama Senate (i.e., the number of eligible voters voting for one senator was in one case 41 times the number of voters in another). The case was named for M. O. Sims, one of the voters who brought the suit, and B. A. Reynolds, a probate judge in Dallas County, one of the named defendants in the original suit. Reynolds was named (along with three other probate judges) as a symbolic representative of all probate judges in the state of Alabama.

== Decision ==
The right to vote freely for the candidate of one's choice is of the essence of a democratic society, and any restrictions on that right strike at the heart of representative government. And the right of suffrage can be denied by a debasement or dilution of the weight of a citizen's vote just as effectively as by wholly prohibiting the free exercise of the franchise. [...] Undoubtedly, the right of suffrage is a fundamental matter in a free and democratic society. Especially since the right to exercise the franchise in a free and unimpaired manner is preservative of other basic civil and political rights, any alleged infringement of the right of citizens to vote must be carefully and meticulously scrutinized.

— Chief Justice Earl Warren on the right to vote as the foundation of democracy in Reynolds v. Sims (1964).

The eight justices who struck down state senate inequality based their decision on the principle of "one person, one vote." In his majority decision, Chief Justice Earl Warren said "Legislators represent people, not trees or acres. Legislators are elected by voters, not farms or cities or economic interests." In addition, the majority simply denied the argument that states were permitted to base their apportionment structures upon the Constitution itself, which requires two senators from each state despite substantially unequal populations among the states.

Justice Tom C. Clark wrote a concurring opinion. Justice Potter Stewart also issued a concurring opinion, in which he argued that while many of the schemes of representation before the court in the case were egregiously undemocratic and clearly violative of equal protection, it was not for the Court to provide any guideline beyond general reasonableness for apportionment of districts.

In dissent, Justice John Marshall Harlan II wrote that the majority had chosen to ignore the language, history, and original intent of the Equal Protection Clause, which did not extend to voting rights. The dissent strongly accused the Court of repeatedly amending the Constitution through its opinions, rather than waiting for the lawful amendment process: "the Court's action now bringing them (state legislative apportionments) within the purview of the Fourteenth Amendment amounts to nothing less than an exercise of the amending power by this Court." The Court had already extended "one person, one vote" to all U.S. congressional districts in Wesberry v. Sanders (1964) a month before, but not to the Senate.

== Aftermath ==
Reynolds v. Sims set off a legislative firestorm across the country. Senator Everett Dirksen of Illinois led a fight to pass a constitutional amendment allowing legislative districts similar to the United States Senate. He warned that:

[T]he forces of our national life are not brought to bear on public questions solely in proportion to the weight of numbers. If they were, the 6 million citizens of the Chicago area would hold sway in the Illinois Legislature without consideration of the problems of their 4 million fellows who are scattered in 100 other counties. Under the Court's new decree, California could be dominated by Los Angeles and San Francisco; Michigan by Detroit.

Numerous states had to change their system of representation in the state legislature. For instance, South Carolina had historically elected one state senator from each county. It devised a reapportionment plan and passed an amendment providing for home rule to counties. While allegations of state senates being redundant arose in the decision's aftermath, all states affected retained their state senates, with state senators being elected from single-member districts. This contrasted with the options of abolishing the upper houses, as had been done in Nebraska in 1936 (Note: Technically, Nebraska abolished the lower house of its legislature, granting its powers to the Nebraska Senate (which was renamed simply the "Nebraska Legislature"), but the end result was effectively the same.) (as well as the provinces of Canada), or electing state senators via proportional representation from either several large multi-member districts or from one statewide at-large district, as was done in Australia.

=== Reactions ===
In a 2015 Time Magazine survey of over 50 law professors, both Erwin Chemerinsky (Dean, UC Berkeley School of Law) and Richard Pildes (NYU School of Law) named Reynolds v. Sims the "best Supreme Court decision since 1960", with Chemerinsky noting that in his opinion, the decision made American government "far more democratic and representative."

== See also ==
- The Shaff Plan
- Alabama Legislative Black Caucus v. Alabama, 575 U.S. ___ (2015)
- List of United States Supreme Court cases, volume 377
