= Gaffney v. Cummings =

- Supreme Court of the United States

Argued February 26–27, 1973 Decided June 18, 1973
- Full case name: J. Brian Gaffney v. Theodore R. Cummings, et al
- Docket no.: 71-1476
- Citations: 412 U.S. 735 (more) 93 S. Ct. 2321; 37 L. Ed. 2d 298

Case history
- Prior: Judgment for Respondents, Cummings v. Meskill, 341 F. Supp. 139 (D. Conn. 1972), reversed

Holding
- Minor deviations from mathematical equality among state legislative districts do not make out a prima facie case of invidious discrimination under the Equal Protection Clause of the Fourteenth Amendment, and in this case, where the House districts deviated on the average by 1.9% and the maximum deviation was 7.83%, a prima facie case was not made out. A "political fairness principle" that achieves a rough approximation of the state-wide political strengths of the two major parties does not violate the Equal Protection Clause.

Court membership
- Chief Justice Warren E. Burger Associate Justices William O. Douglas · William J. Brennan Jr. Potter Stewart · Byron White; Thurgood Marshall · Harry Blackmun; Lewis F. Powell Jr. · William Rehnquist

Case opinions
- Majority: White, joined by Burger, Stewart, Blackmun, Powell, Rehnquist
- Dissent: Brennan, joined by Douglas, Marshall

Gaffney v. Cummings, 412 U.S. 735 (1973), is a Supreme Court decision upholding statewide legislative apportionment plans for Connecticut. The Court admitted that these plans entailed "substantial inequalities in the population of the representative districts." It observed that "the States have made virtually no attempt to justify their failure 'to construct districts ... as nearly of equal population as is practicable." It was a Fourteenth Amendment case. At issue was whether the election districts had been gerrymandered in violation of the Fourteenth Amendment to the Constitution.

== Facts and prior history ==
The various states were eligible, and in some cases required, to redraw certain House districts and state assembly districts as a result of the 1970 Census. Connecticut's assembly has 30 senators and 151 house members. A perfect apportionment would have had 84,228 citizens per senate seat and 20,081 per assembly seat. In Connecticut, the township is the primary unit of government, not the county. The districting commission developed a plan that almost perfectly divided the state into thirty senate districts (mean deviation 0.45%, or +/- 400). The plan for the assembly, respecting the township boundaries as required by the state constitution, had a mean deviation of 1.9%, with the maximum difference between districts 7.83%. The Court did not discuss the choice of townships that composed each district, only the imbalance in size. A voter in a small district would have more influence than a voter in a large district. In other cases, the court had found deviations of 5.97% and 13.1% unacceptable.

Democrats alleged the plan amounted to a political gerrymander and was biased in favor of the Republican Party. The District Court had found against the plan—and by extension, the Republicans. J. Brian Gaffney was chairman of the state Republican Party and is the named petitioner in this case. Theodore R. Cummings was a long-time Connecticut Democrat, before he died in 2015.

== Court decision ==
The Supreme Court's decision was announced on March 18, 1973, and delivered by Justice White. The Connecticut districting system, with a mean deviation of 1.9%, was approved.

Minor deviations from mathematical equality among state legislative districts are insufficient to make out a prima facie case of invidious discrimination under the Fourteenth Amendment to require justification by the State.

== Implications ==
For the past fifty years, the two principal guidelines for determining whether a state redistricting plan is fair are:

One man's vote in a congressional election is to be worth as much as another's

A State must make an honest and good faith effort to construct its districts as nearly of equal population as is practicable, but that absolute equality was a practical impossibility. Mathematical exactness or precision is hardly a workable constitutional requirement.

Subsequent analysis of the facts of the case provided analysts with arguments against First-past-the-post voting systems.

== See also ==
- Fourteenth Amendment
