= Immigration detention in the second Trump administration =

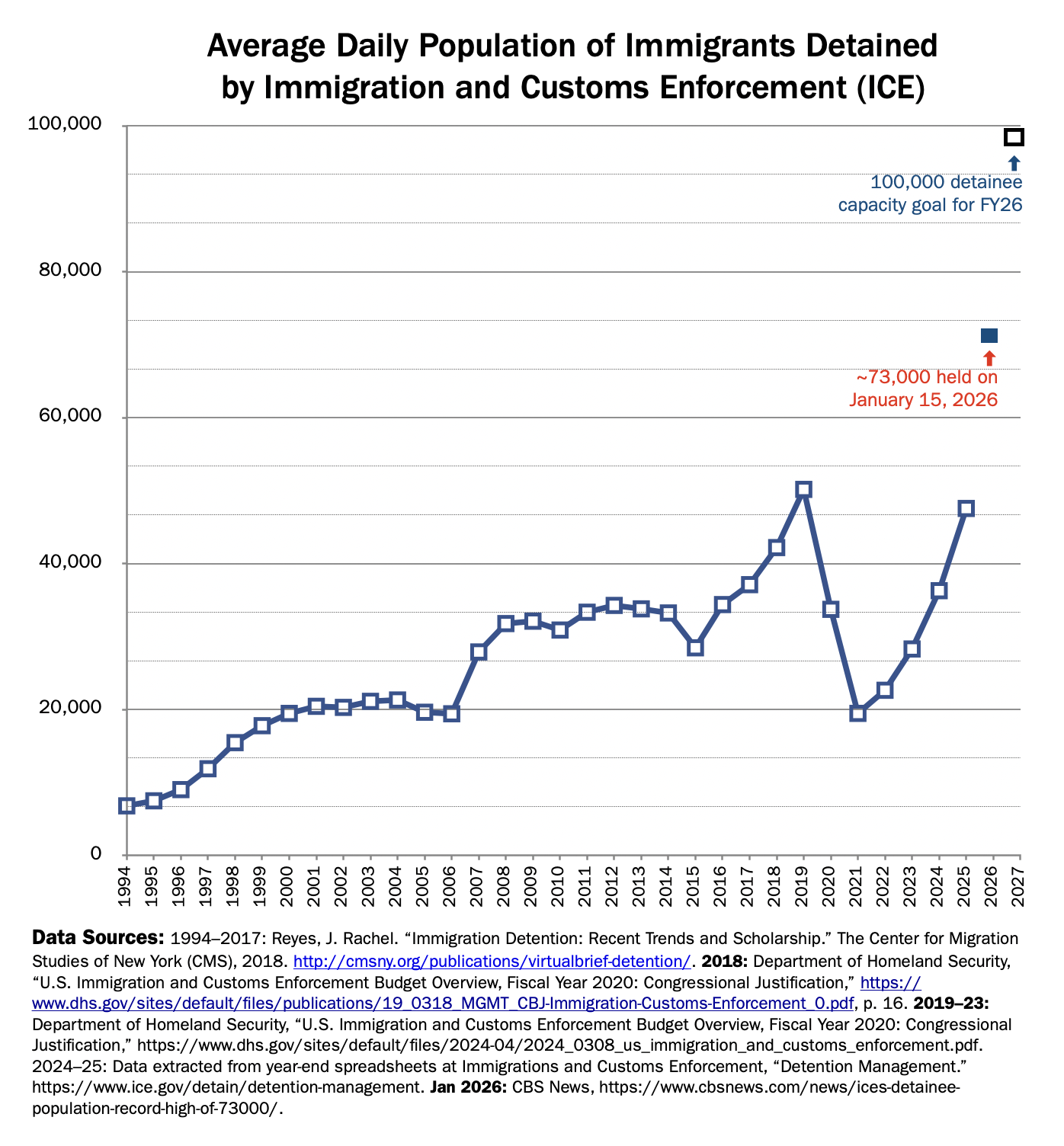
Average daily population of detained immigrants held by the United States government for the fiscal years 1994-2025

The number of people arrested by ICE increased in the second term of Donald Trump, expanding to include greater numbers who had no criminal record.

The second Trump administration has expanded immigration detention in the United States as part of the administration's mass deportation policy. On January 23, 2025, ICE began to carry out raids on sanctuary cities, with hundreds of immigrants detained. The Trump administration reversed the policy of the previous administration and gave ICE permission to raid schools, hospitals and places of worship. Fears of ICE raids have negatively impacted the agriculture, construction, tourism, and hospitality industries. ICE agents conducting raids frequently travel in unmarked vehicles, wear plainclothes and facial coverings, and refuse to identify themselves or present warrants. The administration ordered the re-opening of the Guantanamo Bay detention camp to hold potentially tens of thousands of illegal aliens, but has faced logistical and legal difficulties using it as an immigrant camp. The majority of detentions have been for non-violent matters. Courts have ruled more than 4,400 times that the Trump administration is detaining people illegally. Several US citizens have been detained. In October 2025, around 3,000 people were detained by ICE in the Chicago metropolitan area during Operation Midway Blitz. Government officials refused or were unable to confirm their whereabouts. In July 2026, 49,571 people were arrested by United States Immigration and Customs Enforcement, the highest monthly arrest total during Trump's second presidential term by that point.

== Immigration raids ==
As early as January 23, high-profile ICE raids occurred in Atlanta, Boston, Denver, Miami, New York City, Newark, Philadelphia, Seattle, and Washington, D.C., detaining 538 people. The mayor of Newark claimed that ICE raided a local establishment and detained illegal immigrants as well as citizens, including a veteran, without a warrant.

Initial immigration raids were widely described by both critics and promoted by the Trump administration as purposefully aggressive, with Trump saying they "haven't gone far enough". Videos of ICE and CBP agents smashing car windows, tackling mothers, and lobbing tear gas at citizens and peaceful protesters were quickly shared on social media leading to immense criticism and numerous lawsuits.

Raids in 2025 and early 2026 targeted specific cities and regions, and included Operation Midway Blitz in Chicago, Operation Charlotte's Web in North Carolina, Operations Swamp Sweep and Catahoula Crunch in Louisiana, Operation Metro Surge in Minnesota, Operation Salvo in New York City, and Operation Catch of the Day in Maine.

On September 4, an immigration raid occurred at a Hyundai plant in Georgia detaining approximately 475 workers in what was described as the largest immigration enforcement operation carried out at a single location by Homeland Security. The raid led to a diplomatic row between the United States and South Korea, and analysts described it as deterring foreign investment in America.

Extensive criticism ensued following a "military-style" ICE raid at a residential apartment complex in Chicago's South Shore in the early morning hours of September 30, 2025. The operation featured agents rappelling from black hawk helicopters at 1am, tossing flashbangs at families, and rounding up and zip-tying adults, children, and U.S. citizens.

After the killings of Renee Good and Alex Pretti in Minneapolis, Trump replaced Kristi Noem with Markwayne Mullin as DHS secretary. Mullin has declared that he seeks to implement Trump's mass deportation agenda without generating the controversy associated with ICE's earlier, regionally targeted operations.

Immigration arrests surged in late June, 2026, with over 10,000 people arrested over the course of 5 days. At least 9 people have been killed by gunfire from ICE agents, although not all of the incidents took place during ICE operations.

=== Administrative warrants ===
Utilizing Form I-205, Warrant of Removal
- Presented: May 12, 2025
- Signatories: Todd Lyons

Official website
- "Utilizing Form I-205, Warrant of Removal" (PDF). HSGAC.senate.gov. p. 21. Archived from the original (PDF) on January 22, 2026.

Civil Immigration Arrest Authority: Administrative Arrest Warrants and Warrantless Arrests
- Presented: January 28, 2026

Official website
- Memo via CourtListener

Most immigration arrests are carried out under non-judicial administrative warrants that do not authorize use of force for nonconsensual entry onto private property or other nonpublic spaces, and are authorized by immigration judges, immigration officers, or agencies within the executive branch rather than a federal district judge or magistrate judge. In January 2026, Whistleblower Aid filed an anonymous complaint with Congress disclosing an internal May 2025 ICE memorandum articulating a policy directive approved by acting ICE Director Todd Lyons that authorized the use of administrative warrants for arrest by ICE agents in places of residence that the complaint contends violates the Fourth Amendment. While the memo states that DHS did not rely exclusively on administrative warrants for alien arrests in places of residence historically, the memo also states that the DHS general counsel's office had recently concluded that doing so was not prohibited by the U.S. Constitution, the Immigration and Nationality Act, or immigration regulations. While the memo asserts that administrative warrants are not search warrants and have a knock-and-announce requirement, the memo also asserts that ICE agents are permitted to forcibly enter residences to make arrests and detentions pursuant to a final order of removal issued by an immigration judge, the Board of Immigration Appeals, a federal district judge, or a federal magistrate judge.

The complaint alleges that the memo was not widely circulated within the agency and exposure to it was highly controlled, with some DHS employees being asked to return the memo after reading it; one of the two whistleblowers was only allowed to view the memo alongside a supervisor, required to return it after reading, and barred from taking any notes. However, the complaint alleges that the memo's content has been used to train ICE officers deployed on the nationwide immigration raids and continues to be required guidance for new ICE officers and trainees—despite other written DHS training materials explicitly contradicting the memo's administrative warrants guidance. How widely the memo's guidance was applied was unknown at the time of the complaint; the Associated Press reported that documents it reviewed of a forced entry and arrest in Minneapolis on January 11, 2026 showed the ICE agents involved only procured an administrative warrant. In a press statement addressing the memo after its disclosure, DHS spokesperson Tricia McLaughlin stated that persons affected by administrative warrants received "full due process and a final order of removal from an immigration judge. The officers issuing these administrative warrants also have found probable cause. For decades, the Supreme Court and Congress have recognized the propriety of administrative warrants in cases of immigration enforcement."

The memo has been criticized by legal scholars and immigration lawyers, and at least one lawsuit has been filed to block its implementation. Administrative warrants are authorized and generally required for immigration arrests under Section 1226(a) of Title 8 of the United States Code, while Section 1357(a) of Title 8 provides a plain view of illegal entry exception and a reason to believe and likelihood of escape exception to Section 1226 that allow for warrantless arrests. Lyons issued a subsequent memo pursuant to Section 1357(a) in January 2026, while a federal judge in Oregon ruled in a class-action lawsuit against DHS the following month that immigration officers may not conduct warrantless arrests without a likelihood of escape. While the U.S. Supreme Court upheld the use of administrative warrants in Abel v. United States (1960) and the constitutionality of Section 1226 in Demore v. Kim (2003), the Congressional Research Service (CRS) referenced the Court's decisions in Almeida-Sanchez v. United States (1973) and United States v. Brignoni-Ponce (1975) in reports released in 2021 and 2025 as establishing that the Fourth Amendment's prohibition against "unreasonable searches and seizures" extends to arrests and detentions to enforce civil immigration law in the interior of the United States—where the border search exception does not generally apply and without regard to an alien's immigration status.

Referencing the Supreme Court's decision in Maryland v. Pringle (2003), the 2025 CRS report noted further that lower federal courts have interpreted the reason to believe exception of Section 1357(a) for warrantless immigration arrests to be equivalent to the Fourth Amendment's probable cause requirement, and have applied the Supreme Court's holding in Graham v. Connor (1989) that the Fourth Amendment prohibits the use of excessive force in criminal law cases over immigration arrests. While noting the Supreme Court's holdings in California v. Greenwood (1988) and Florida v. White (1999) permitting warrantless searches in public spaces due to the absence of a reasonable expectation of privacy, the 2025 CRS report references lower federal court rulings that nonetheless held that ICE agents must have probable cause of the presence of an unlawful alien and the exigent circumstance of a likely escape to conduct a warrantless arrest, as well as conflicting lower court rulings on conducting warrantless surveillance for immigration enforcement in places of worship due to restrictions from the First Amendment and the Religious Freedom Restoration Act.

Noting the Supreme Court's rulings in Stoner v. California (1964), Mancusi v. DeForte (1968), Schneckloth v. Bustamonte (1973), Marshall v. Barlow's (1977), Payton v. New York (1980), California v. Ciraolo (1986), and Riley v. California (2014), the 2025 CRS report cites lower federal court rulings that have held that administrative warrants do not confer the same legal authority as judicial warrants, and have ruled that ICE agents have violated the Fourth Amendment when forcibly entering private homes without a judicial warrant and where no established Fourth Amendment exceptions applied. However, referencing the Supreme Court's rulings in Brignoni-Ponce, Florida v. Royer (1983), Immigration and Naturalization Service v. Delgado (1984), and Muehler v. Mena (2005), the 2025 CRS report noted that while the Court has held that while interrogation alone without detention about a person's citizenship in public places does not violate the Fourth Amendment, the Court has held that brief detentions without arrest, traffic stops, and stop-and-frisks require at least reasonable suspicion based on the totality of the circumstances to be conducted without a warrant (including in proximity to the borders of the United States). Following these precedents, the CRS notes that lower federal courts have ruled that the reasonable suspicion standard does not authorize brief detentions by immigration officers strictly due to suspected alienage (but instead requires suspected unlawful presence), nor detaining workers during interrogation.

=== Arrest warrants ===
The administration has "expanded" warrantless arrests which multiple judges have ruled against.

=== Facial recognition technology ===
In a lawsuit filed in January 2026, Illinois and Chicago alleged that DHS agents had used Mobile Fortify more than 100,000 times in the interior of the United States. First brought to public attention in reporting by 404 Media in June 2025, the mobile app features a facial recognition system on photos taken to search federal and state databases that a federal court has ruled are impermissible for procuring administrative warrants due to inaccuracy, while the Illinois and Chicago lawsuit alleges that the department's use of the app exceeds what federal law authorizes for data collection of biometrics. While the lawsuit alleges specific cases of federal immigration agents scanning a person's face without consent, news organizations have reported that federal immigration agents frequently perform such scans without consent and legal commentators have noted that the use of such facial recognition technology (FRT) by federal immigration enforcement had been previously limited to ports of entry and in investigations.

In the same month the Illinois and Chicago lawsuit was filed, The New York Times reported that unnamed current and former DHS officials have confirmed that Mobile Fortify, the FRT and location tracking tools developed by Palantir Technologies and Clearview AI, and other cellphone hacking and social media tracking tools are being used by DHS immigration enforcement agencies to both attempt to identify undocumented immigrants and to track the locations and monitor the online activity of citizens who are anti-deportation protestors. U.S. Senator Ed Markey with colleagues wrote letters to ICE in September 2025 and November 2025 requesting that the agency stop using the technologies and answer questions about the agency's use of them (specifically if they were being used to identify citizens, protestors, and minors), while a bill proposed in Congress in January 2026 would ban DHS from using Mobile Fortify and similar apps. Mobile Fortify was developed by NEC, a Japanese information technology company.

In 2020, the Government Accountability Office (GAO) issued a report that noted that while there is no comprehensive federal data privacy law or federal law that specifically and explicitly regulates commercial use of FRT, the GAO suggested that federal laws that address the commercial use, collection, and storage of personal data may nonetheless apply to commercial FRT and other biometrics technology—specifically, the Driver's Privacy Protection Act, the Health Insurance Portability and Accountability Act, the Fair Credit Reporting Act, the Family Educational Rights and Privacy Act, the Computer Fraud and Abuse Act, the Children's Online Privacy Protection Act, and Section 5 of the Federal Trade Commission Act. Along with the Congressional Research Service in a 2020 report, the GAO similarly suggested in a 2022 report that the requirements for federal agency collection, use, and storage of personal data under the Privacy Act of 1974 and the E-Government Act of 2002 may also apply to FRT and biometrics technology. The 2020 GAO and CRS reports both note that there are state laws that explicitly regulate commercial use of biometric data or FRT (referencing the California Consumer Privacy Act), while a 2023 CRS report notes that DHS is required to maintain a biometric entry-and-exit records system on non-citizens under the Patriot Act.

The 2020 CRS report noted that federal case law analyzing constitutional issues with FRT is limited. While noting the Supreme Court's decision in Katz v. United States (1967) that established the reasonable expectation of privacy standard and legal test for what constitutes search and seizures generally permits warrantless searches in public places, the CRS also noted that the Court qualified its ruling in United States v. Knotts (1983) upholding the warrantless surveillance at issue in the case because, despite the fact that the evidence obtained by the government could have been acquired by visual surveillance in public, "different constitutional principles may be applicable" if "twenty-four hours surveillance of any citizen of this country [were] possible." As such, the CRS noted that the Court applied the qualification to its holding in Knotts to its decisions in United States v. Jones (2012) and Carpenter v. United States (2018) requiring warrants for searches that used GPS tracking and cellphone surveillance—which led the CRS to conclude that the Court's decisions in the cases suggest that when surveillance conducted in public is prolonged and continuous may nonetheless constitute a search requiring a warrant under the Fourth Amendment.

However, the CRS also noted in its 2020 report that while the Court declined to extend the third-party doctrine established in United States v. Miller (1976) and Smith v. Maryland (1979) to the surveillance presented in Carpenter, the CRS suggested, citing a lower court ruling, that law enforcement use of FRT on driver's license photographs maintained by a department of motor vehicles or photographs held by other third parties probably does not implicate the Fourth Amendment. Nonetheless, citing news reporting about mass surveillance in China, limitations on the technological infrastructure for law enforcement's use of FRT in the United States, and lower federal court rulings that did not address what degree of prolonged surveillance in public implicates the Fourth Amendment, the CRS concluded that how the Court's Fourth Amendment jurisprudence would apply to use of FRT and other biometric technology in the interior of the United States was unclear and unresolved.

Provided that the searches are routine and minimally intrusive, the 2020 CRS report noted that lower federal courts had held that use of FRT and collection of biometric data at the borders of the United States, ports of entry, or their functional equivalent are allowed under the border search exception to the Fourth Amendment. While the CRS noted that little federal case law addresses challenges to wrongful arrests based on unreliable FRT, the CRS referenced the Supreme Court's decisions in Aguilar v. Texas (1964), Illinois v. Gates (1983), Maryland v. Pringle (2003), and Florida v. Harris (2013) and other lower federal court rulings on the reliability of informants and detection dogs in suggesting that the reliability and accuracy of specific FRT systems would likely be subject to review by courts when assessing the legal basis for a search or an arrest and following the totality of the circumstances standard established in Illinois v. Gates.

The 2020 CRS report noted that the Supreme Court and lower federal courts had not addressed challenges to FRT use under the First Amendment, but referencing the Court's holding NAACP v. Alabama (1958) establishing a relationship between freedom of association and privacy, the CRS suggested that there could be First Amendment implications for use of FRT if it is used to conduct retaliatory arrests and prosecutions for persons engaged in protected speech. The 2020 CRS report also noted that federal courts had rarely addressed equal protection challenges to use of FRT under the Due Process Clause of the Fifth Amendment or the Equal Protection Clause of the Fourteenth Amendment, and referencing Washington v. Davis (1976), Village of Arlington Heights v. Metropolitan Housing Development Corp. (1977), Personnel Administrator of Massachusetts v. Feeney (1979), and McCleskey v. Kemp (1987), the CRS noted that such claims would require plaintiffs to show that the actions of defendants have both a discriminatory effect and purpose for the claims to be upheld.

=== Sanctuary jurisdictions ===
In 2025, San Francisco and other local governments with sanctuary city policies filed a lawsuit against the administration over Executive Order 14159, Executive Order 14218, and a February 2025 memo issued by Attorney General Pam Bondi over imposed conditions to receive federal funding that the plaintiffs alleged were not authorized by Congress and that effectively required enforcement of federal immigration law, while similar lawsuits were filed in Massachusetts and Rhode Island. Conversely, the second Trump administration filed litigation against Illinois, New York, Colorado, New York City, Boston, Rochester, New York, and multiple cities in New Jersey for their sanctuary policies. In a January 24, 2026 letter to Minnesota Governor Tim Walz following the protests in the state in response to the killings of Renée Good and Alex Pretti during the mass deployment of ICE and Border Patrol to the state, Bondi requested that the state government repeal sanctuary policies in the state, give the Justice Department's Civil Rights Division access to the state's voter rolls, and share its Medicaid, Food and Nutrition Service, and Supplemental Nutrition Assistance Program records with the Justice Department for its investigation of the 2020s Minnesota fraud scandals.

A day after the letter was sent, Trump called on Congress to pass legislation to ban state and local government sanctuary policies and called on Walz, Minneapolis Mayor Jacob Frey, and all Democratic governors and mayors "to formally cooperate with the Trump Administration to enforce our Nation's Laws, rather than resist and stoke the flames of Division, Chaos, and Violence." Bondi's letter was referenced in oral arguments for a class-action lawsuit filed by Minnesota against DHS to block the mass operation in the state. In separate reports issued in 2025, the CRS noted that the Supreme Court held in Hines v. Davidowitz (1941), Kleindienst v. Mandel (1972), and Arizona v. United States (2012) that immigration laws passed by Congress generally preempt state laws under the Supremacy Clause of Article Six, and along with other lower federal court rulings, the CRS has noted that state and local law enforcement have limited legal authority to arrest and detain aliens for immigration law violations, and generally may only do so under a cooperative agreement with DHS under Section 1357(g) of Title 8 of the United States Code.

However, the CRS also noted that the Court held in De Canas v. Bica (1976), Chamber of Commerce v. Whiting (2011), and Kansas v. Garcia (2020) that not all state laws related to aliens are immigration regulations preempted by federal law. Moreover, referencing the Court's decisions in New York v. United States (1992) and Murphy v. National Collegiate Athletic Association (2018), the CRS has noted that lower federal courts have held that the Tenth Amendment prohibits the federal government from commandeering state government resources to enforce federal immigration law, and that state and local governments enforcing a federal detention request can be held in violation of the Fourth Amendment if the request lacks probable cause—which is why various state and local governments have enacted laws limiting their law enforcement agencies from cooperating with federal immigration enforcement in order to shield themselves from legal liability. The Supreme Court incorporated the Fourth Amendment's requirements for warrants directly against state governments in Aguilar v. Texas (1964) by the Due Process Clause of the Fourteenth Amendment.

Also, referencing South Dakota v. Dole (1987) and National Federation of Independent Business v. Sebelius (2012), the CRS has also noted that the Taxing and Spending Clause of Article One, Section Eight does not authorize Congress to place conditions on federal funding to state governments without providing notice to recipients identifying what constitutes compliance and noncompliance with the conditions to receive the funding, that are unrelated to the essential purpose of the funding, that are coercive such that they compel actions that the states would otherwise not perform, and where the conditions would require states to act unconstitutionally. As such, the CRS noted in a separate report issued in 2021 that lower federal courts struck down Executive Order 13768 issued during the first Trump administration because it ordered the Justice Department and DHS to restrict the grant eligibility of sanctuary jurisdictions for noncompliance with Section 1373 of Title 8, and Congress had not required compliance with Section 1373 for the specific funding that the first Trump administration ordered to be withheld.

=== Mandatory detention and bond hearings ===
In July 2025, the Trump administration expanded its mandatory immigration detention policy to include immigrants who entered the United States without lawful admission. The policy made them ineligible for bond hearings before immigration judges, regardless of how long they had lived in the country. In October 2026, the U.S. Court of Appeals for the Fifth Circuit upheld the policy against a constitutional challenge.

== Arrest and detention statistics ==
The rate of ICE detentions accelerated during the second Trump administration.

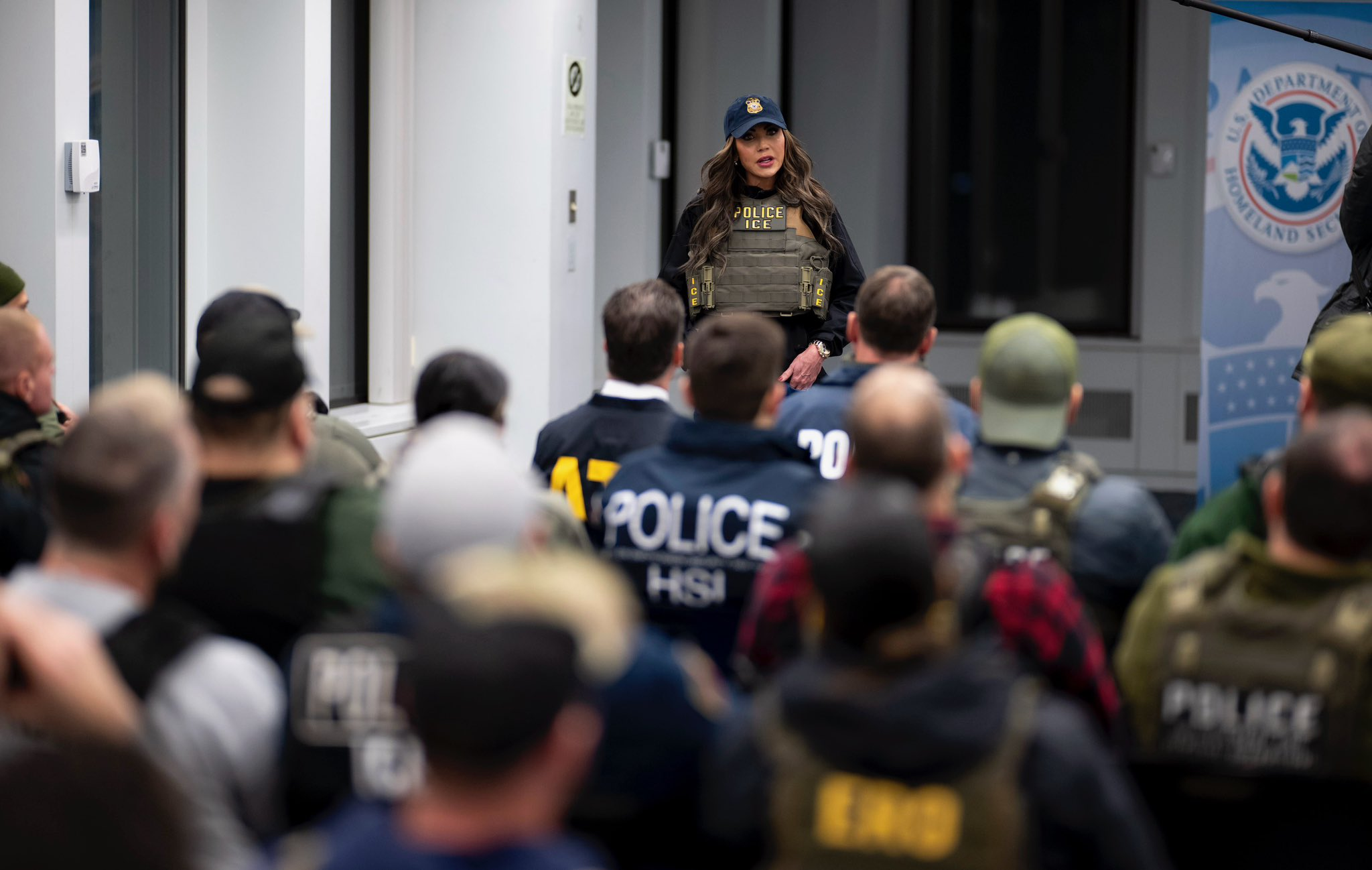
United States Secretary of Homeland Security Kristi Noem speaking to law enforcement agents during an ICE raid, 2025

Trump set a goal of 1,200 to 1,500 ICE arrests per day, but his administration has largely failed to meet these targets. Trump's administration saw about 800 ICE arrests per day after he took office in January, declining to fewer than 600 arrests per day in February, at which point ICE stopped publishing daily statistics. Trump's rates of arrests lag those of both the Obama and Biden administrations, despite ICE officers working extra shifts and being given arrest quotas. Trump's relatively low rate of immigration enforcement has been attributed to limitations in ICE resources and staffing, as well as a dramatic decrease in the number of immigrants illegally crossing the US-Mexico border since Trump took office. In May 2025, Kristi Noem and Stephen Miller pushed ICE to increase its arrest numbers to 3,000 per day. ICE encouraged officers to make warrantless arrests and to "turn the creative knob up to 11" in meeting the updated detention targets, including interviewing and arresting individuals they may coincidentally encounter dubbed "collaterals".

ICE officials said in early March 2025 that 32,809 arrests were made between January 20 and March 10, 2025. They also accused the Biden administration of inflating arrest statistics. At the beginning of 2025, there were over 41,000 people in ICE custody. By mid-March, ICE reported holding 46,269 people in custody. As of February 2026, ICE reported it used 225 detention facilities in the current fiscal year, which began on October 1, 2025. On January 15, 2026, ICE reported holding around 73,000 individuals in custody, the highest level since its founding in 2003.

In early September 2025, the Board of Immigration Appeals reversed an earlier decision that had allowed immigration judges to conduct bail hearings for detained migrants who entered the US without inspection. Immigration attorneys and advocates called this decision "deeply flawed" and "a terrible plan" that would enrich private prison companies holding detainees in substandard conditions. Later that month, a habeas corpus petition was filed on behalf of a detained 46-year-old double amputee with a pending permanent residence petition who had been taken into ICE custody based on a burglary conviction from his teenage years for which he had been pardoned in 2010. His attorney predicted that thousands more such petitions would be filed in the wake of the immigration appeals board decision.

Around the beginning of 2026, ICE undertook a program to expand its detention facilities, with a goal of operating 100,000 nightly detention beds. The agency purchased 11 warehouses and proposed purchasing 34 altogether. The plan encountered local opposition in the majority of sites, regardless of the local party in power. ICE continued to implement the plan, but paused new purchases in late March. Several of the sites are under stop-work orders from judges or DHS.

By February 2026, The New York Times reported "federal judges have found that the Trump administration has been ignoring longstanding legal interpretations that mandate the release of many people who are taken into immigration custody if they post a bond", resulting in lawsuits and many releases.

As of May 2026, ICE was holding around 60,000 people in detention and had booked around 400,000 people since the beginning of Trump's second presidential term. The Brookings Institution estimated that 205,000 children, 145,000 of them being US citizen children, had been affected by the detention of a parent.

Between March 2024 and March 2026, the number of people detained for over a year more than quintupled, jumping from 412 to 2,220 people.

== Media campaign ==
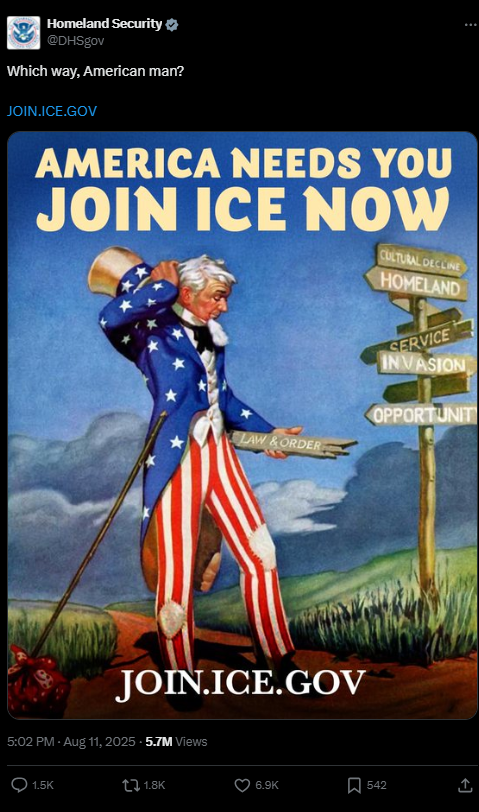
An ICE recruitment poster posted by Homeland Security on X on August 11, 2025 featured the caption "Which way, American man?", a reference to the 1978 book Which Way Western Man? which depicts Jews, Black people, and nonwhite immigrants as an existential threat to the United States.

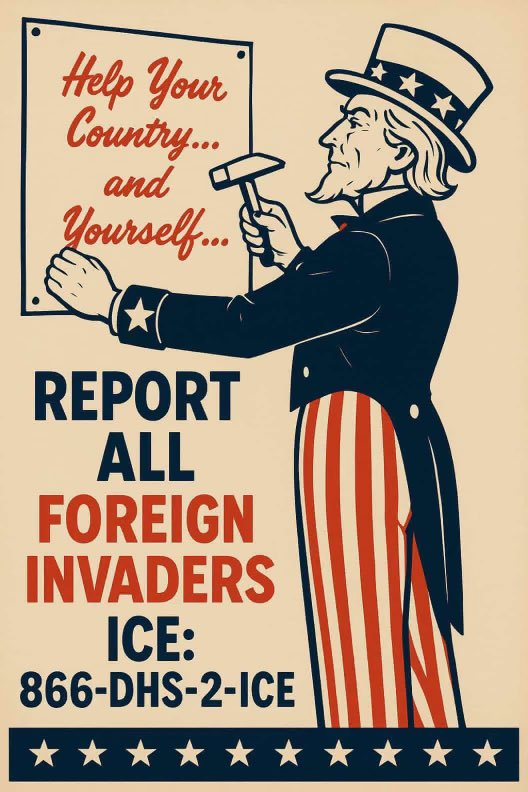
An anti-immigrant World War II-style propaganda poster posted by Homeland Security on X on June 11, 2025, telling readers to report "foreign invaders" to ICE during the Los Angeles protests. The poster was previously circulated by far-right accounts.

Amid relatively low numbers of ICE arrests and deportations, Trump's administration sought to inflate the presence of deportations in media, such as by posting images of shackled deportees on social media, manipulating Google searches by updating timestamps of old ICE press releases, and allowing celebrities like Dr. Phil to accompany ICE raids. Commentators described the media campaign as coming close to "glorifying violence and rough justice" and prioritizing "looking tough". The meme-heavy publicity campaign was run by political appointees in their 20s, and received criticism from political commentators and scholars for being unprofessional and intentionally cruel, and promoting white nationalism, remigration, Nazism, fascism, and antisemitism.

In February 2025, the White House posted a video on social media showing immigrants in shackles being prepared for a deportation flight, along with footage of a set of handcuffs and chains jingling as they are pulled from a basket and laid out on airport tarmac next to others. The video was captioned "ASMR: Illegal Alien Deportation Flight", and was shared by the Seattle office of ICE, along with a different caption. Responses to the video ranged, with some cheering the actions shown in the video, while others called it disgusting and dehumanizing.

Department of Homeland Security video warning featuring Kristi Noem

In March 2025, DHS skipped a competitive bidding process and awarded two Republican-linked firms $200 million to create an anti-migrant ad campaign that praised Trump. The adverts played on television channels and featured Kristi Noem thanking Trump and touting the administration's deportation efforts. The videos drew attention for their use of campaign-style footage of Trump.

In late April 2025 the administration posted multiple stylized booking photos along the White House north lawns perimeter with the word 'Arrested' and a severe crime listed beneath an unblurred image. The administration claims that the individuals depicted in the signs have all entered the country illegally and were all convicted of severe crimes such as murder, kidnapping, sexual assault of a child and rape. Shortly after the posting of the signs the official White House Twitter account posted photos used in the signs along with the individuals full names.

Politico described the administration's legal setbacks on deportation being used as part of a public relations campaign that relied on "oversimplifications" and "misrepresentations" of his legal cases to tell the story of "a president trying to get violent criminals out of the country, only to be blocked by obstinate judges".

== Conditions in detention ==
Detainees have reported overcrowded and unsanitary conditions in ICE detention. A group of women was denied access to the bathroom and forced to urinate on the floor of a prison bus on the way to Krome detention center in Florida. Detainees have reported being denied access to food, water, and showers.

An analysis of internal ICE reports found a 54 percent increase in the first year of Trump's second term in individuals subjected to force while in ICE detention.

A September 2025 report in The Guardian on the Alexandria, Louisiana detention center documented overcrowding, substandard conditions, lack of access to medical treatment, stays longer than the three days allowed for short-term facilities, difficulties accessing lawyers and family, indifference from facility staff and other issues. Private company Geo Group runs the Alexandria facility. Geo Group donated US$1 million to Trump-aligned political action committee MAGA Inc. in 2024; ICE acting director Tom Homan was a paid consultant to the firm prior to joining the Trump administration. Four days previous to a February 2025 ICE inspection of the facility it was given a waiver from standard medical screening standards for detainees. DHS and Geo Group representatives denied that there were issues with conditions at the Alexandria detention facility, but without addressing specifics. A later report on an ICE detention facility in California City, California, echoed concerns about substandard conditions and alleged detainees who protested were put into solitary confinement. Private company CoreCivic, which reopened and runs the facility, a former state prison that had been closed in March 2024, denied the allegations. In addition to the conditions for detainees, advocates claimed it was being run without the necessary permits or approval process.

A September 2025 report from Physicians for Human Rights, the Peeler Immigration Lab and Harvard University Law School experts on solitary confinement in ICE detention facilities showed an escalation under the Trump administration, including for individuals, durations and reasons that violated ICE guidelines as well as international standards for humane detention. A November 2025 lawsuit alleged inhumane conditions in the Broadview ICE facility outside of Chicago. According to the lawsuit, detainees were denied access to bathrooms, clean beds, legal representation and contact with the outside world. An Egyptian political asylee detained by ICE for 10 weeks said that his detention in the United States was as brutal as his detention in Egypt was.

A December 2025 Amnesty International report found numerous human rights violations at Florida's "Alligator Alcatraz" and Krome detention centers. Violations and abuses identified by Amnesty included arbitrary detention, unsanitary conditions (toilets overflowing, limited access to showers, exposure to insects, 24-hour lighting, poor food and water quality and lack of privacy), and incommunicado detention at Alligator Alcatraz, as well as overcrowding, medical negligence, prolonged arbitrary and retaliatory solitary confinement, violence by guards, including in the presence of human rights monitors, and similarly unsanitary and inhumane detention conditions at Krome. A leaked January 2026 video showed overcrowded, unsanitary conditions inside an ICE detention center in Baltimore, Maryland. Immigrant rights advocates had raised alarm about conditions in this facility in the spring of 2025.

Detainees at the CoreCivic-run detention facility in Dilley, Texas wrote letters and had family record their video calls to draw attention to the conditions and prolonged nature of their detention. This effort helped to publicize the prolonged detention of children at the facility. Detainees said that guards at the facility began confiscating writing and artistic supplies and monitoring detainees' phone calls after information about conditions at the facility became public.

In July 2026, at least 12 detainees at a Geo Group-run ICE processing center in Aurora, Colorado contracted tuberculosis. During the outbreak, air conditioning in the facility broke down, leaving detainees quarantined with outside temperatures of 96 degrees Fahrenheit. The quarantine included the entire pod of 88 detainees; it did not separate sick detainees from the non-infected.

=== Treatment of pregnant detainees ===
In May 2025, A pregnant Tennessee woman was detained by ICE and held at Richwood Correctional Center in Louisiana. While in detention, she lost her mid-term pregnancy after days of pleading for medical care. Physicians said the loss of her pregnancy was due to a lack of pre-natal care. She was later deported to Guatemala. An October 2025 report by the American Civil Liberties Union documented numerous cases of ICE detention of pregnant women, in contravention of ICE's own policy against the practice. At least 14 pregnant detainees were held at Basile Detention Center in Louisiana as of April 2025. ICE has stopped reporting the number of pregnant people in its custody and refused to hand that information over to Congress. The ACLU documented instances of "miscarriages, denial of prenatal care, and inadequate food and medical attention" faced by pregnant women in immigration detention.

=== Torture in detention ===
Human rights experts argue Immigration and Customs Enforcement (ICE) officers' treatment of immigrants in custody during the second Trump administration meets the legal definition of torture according to the UN Convention Against Torture. Immigrants have described detention facilities as "torture chambers", "hell on earth", and as an "endless nightmare". Over 70,000 people were in ICE custody in January 2026 compared to an average of 30,000 in the middle of the Biden administration. There have been at least 58 deaths in ICE detention between January 2025 and October 2026.

One method of torture used against detainees is restraining their feet to the ground for hours outside in a small cage called "the box", exposing them to mosquitoes, insects, and dangerous humidity levels without water. Another method is putting them in "the WRAP", a straitjacket-like full-body restraint that can restrict breathing used to punish detainees for expressing fear about being deported or asking for their attorneys. Guards create an atmosphere of "terror and humiliation", often berating detainees with racial slurs or insults and banging on their cages. Detainees are subjected to prolonged solitary confinement, are given scarce food portions sometimes containing maggots, and are sometimes forced to sleep exposed to extreme weather conditions, insects, and fecal matter.

=== Deaths in detention ===
By the end of February, at least three people had died in ICE detention centers since the beginning of the Trump presidency.

In April 2025, Washington state representative Pramila Jayapal's office raised alarm over the suicide of a Chinese national in CBP custody at Yuma Border Patrol Station. Though her suicide was seen in surveillance footage, CBP could not verify whether required welfare checks were performed and did not render a medical response for nearly two hours. On April 16, a 58-year-old Vietnamese refugee with dementia living in Albuquerque died in ICE detention, with his family alleging that he died due to medical neglect. On April 25, a Haitian woman who had been detained at Broward Transitional Center died, leading to outcry over her alleged medical neglect. Altogether, at least seven people died in ICE custody within the first 100 days of the Trump presidency. By mid-May, nine had died, including a 68-year-old man who died in transit the month after his confinement when he reportedly had been in good health.

In June, a 49-year-old Canadian man died in ICE custody. By July, 13 had died in ICE custody. On August 7, a 32-year-old Chinese citizen was found hanging in his cell in ICE custody in Pennsylvania.

On December 3, a 48-year-old man from Guatemala who reportedly had been healthy when detained and sent to Camp East Montana died in an El Paso hospital from liver and kidney complications. Earlier, his widow, who had been separated from him since their detention, had been deported to Guatemala. Amnesty International and other activists have called for the closure of Camp East Montana after multiple reports about conditions there; DHS has denied these reports. On December 14, a 46-year-old Eritrean man died after seven months in ICE custody in Philipsburg, Pennsylvania.

By December 2025, ICE had reported 32 detainee deaths since January 20, compared to 24 such deaths during the four-year presidency of Joe Biden. The higher number of deaths was attributed to increased numbers of detainees, increased reliance on private detention facilities, frequent transfers between facilities and the dismantling of government offices investigating discrimination, neglect and mistreatment in detention. The number of deaths in ICE detention in 2025 was the highest since 2004. In December, four people died in the span of four days according to ICE press releases.

On January 3, 2026, a 55-year-old Cuban man died in ICE detention at Camp East Montana. ICE said his death was a suicide, but a witness said he was choked by a guard. Subsequently, the medical examiner who assessed his case ruled it a homicide. On January 14, 36-year-old Nicaraguan immigrant Victor Manuel Diaz was the third person to die at Camp East Montana after being taken there by ICE from Minnesota. In January 2026, 46-year-old Cambodian refugee Parady La died from drug withdrawal in ICE detention in Philadelphia. La's family accused ICE of medical neglect, saying they were told that he was begging for help in the final hours of his life. In March, 56 year old Haitian asylum seeker Emmanuel Damas died from an infected tooth at a hospital in Scottsdale, Arizona after four months of detention at Florence Correctional Center.

In March 2026, a 41 year old Afghan asylum seeker who collaborated with the US military during the US war in Afghanistan died of an allergic reaction in ICE detention.

As of April 2026, 17 people had died in ICE detention since the beginning of the year; approximately one per week. A San Francisco Chronicle investigation found that several of the deaths were caused by medical misdiagnosis and delayed treatment and could have been prevented.

As of May 2026, "at least 10 detainees have died by suicide since President Donald Trump returned to office in January 2025". On June 4, 43 year old Georgian migrant Mamuka Artmeladze became the 50th person to die in ICE detention during the second Trump presidency.

In June 2026, a medical examiner ruled that the March 2026 death of a 31 year old Haitian asylum seeker shortly after she was released from ICE custody was a homicide, "indicating the death was caused by the actions of another individual" after she was found dead from hypothermia at a bus stop in Pittsburgh. The same month, the administration modified the "Notification, Review, and Reporting Requirements for Detainee Deaths" Directive to no longer apply to detainee deaths that occur within 30 days of release from custody.

On June 24, Adrian Andreas Florian, an 85 year old German man, died in a Texas hospital after 10 months in ICE detention. He became the 21st person to die in ICE custody in 2026.

On July 24, 29 year old Priciliano Trejo died 9 days after being released to a hospital from ICE custody in a coma.

On August 1, 41 year old Edwin Lopez Cornejo died in detention at Delaney Hall. His family blamed his death on his being deprived of his diabetes medication, and called for justice. Following Cornejo's death, two more previously unreported deaths at Delaney Hall were revealed. Rob Menendez learned of the death of another detainee two weeks earlier, who was brought to an area hospital shortly before his demise. Immigrant advocates learned from the family of another detainee that he had died in similar circumstances. Neither death was reported due to changes in ICE reporting protocols.

==== Geraldo Lunas Campos ====
On January 3, 2026, 55-year-old Geraldo Lunas Campos died while in Immigration and Customs Enforcement (ICE) custody in Camp East Montana at Fort Bliss in El Paso, Texas. The Department of Homeland Security (DHS) said Lunas Campos had attempted suicide, but witnesses said he died after being restrained by multiple guards. His death was ruled a homicide by the El Paso County Coroner.

== Detainee characteristics ==
The Trump administration frequently states detainees targeted by ICE are "the worst of the worst" and violent criminals. The Economist described the claim as having "little basis in reality", with a majority of detainees having no criminal records.

NBC News reported that the number of ICE detainees increased from 39,238 to 41,169 over the first two weeks of February 2025. They reported that almost all of the 4,422 new detainees were male, with only 22 females. The report stated that 41% of the new detainees had no criminal charges, compared to 28% under the Biden administration. The report also noted that ICE had the capacity to hold 41,500 people, and new capacity was being sought both in the United States and Guantanamo Bay.

In early April 2025, attorneys for Venezuelan immigrants with temporary protected status reported that their clients were being arrested and detained in possible violation of law, including while complying with rules to check in with ICE. In May 2025, a group of Venezuelan detainees who had been temporarily blocked from deportation to El Salvador formed an "SOS" by linking their bodies together in the yard of the Bluebonnet Detention Facility. The detainees and their families have rejected government claims that they are gang members and decried the use of the Alien Enemies Act to circumvent the ordinary asylum process.

By June 2025, The Independent highlighted released data that indicated non-criminal ICE arrests had jumped more than 800% since April, that only 30% of those in detention had criminal convictions with 27% having pending criminal charges, and only 8.5% of those with criminal records were for violent offenses. The increased non-criminal arrests were described as part of the Trump administration's efforts to ramp up deportations at all costs. CNN reported internal ICE statistics showing less than 10% of immigrants in ICE custody since October 2024 had criminal offenses, and stated that internal ICE documents suggested officials were not focused on violent criminals. On June 20 2025, the Cato Institute reported on nonpublic data of ICE arrests that indicated 65% detained by ICE had no criminal convictions, and that 93% had no violent convictions. A July 2025 analysis of statistics from the Deportation Data Project shows that the proportion of immigrants convicted of violent crimes has dropped from the Biden administration's 10% to 7% during the Trump administration, when comparing the period January 20-June 26. As of November 30, 2025, 73.6% of detainees had no criminal conviction. Many of the convicted detainees committed only minor defenses such as traffic violations.

On January 29, 2026, The Economist reported that while the Trump administration claimed to be targeting "the worst of the worst", only 5% of recent detainees had been convicted of violent crimes. At the end of the Biden administration, the percentage of criminals captured by ICE was at 64%, falling to roughly 30% by November 2025.

=== Refugees ===
In Pennsylvania, 10 Lhotshampa Bhutanese refugees were detained in ICE raids. As many as 60 Bhutanese refugees have been detained nationwide. Those detained were afforded refugee status, but ICE pointed to their criminal records, ranging from driving under the influence to felony assault, to justify the revocation of their legal status and their deportation. Many had already served their time in U.S. prisons or on probation and reintegrated into society.

Neither Bhutan nor Nepal accepts Lhotshampa refugees as citizens, rendering them stateless when deported from the US. Several of those deported were forced to return to refugee camps in Nepal.

=== Children ===
In February 2025, Reuters reported that ICE planned to locate over 600,000 people who entered the U.S. as children without their parents, some of whom were no longer children and some of whom had rejoined and were living with parents, and either deport them, if deportation had already been ordered, or serve notice to appear in immigration court. On March 6, 2025, ICE began to detain immigrant parents and children together in a Texas detention facility. The first group contained 3 minor children.

In October 2025, cases emerged where migrant children had been misclassified as unaccompanied or otherwise separated from their parents, who were then moved between several ICE detention facilities. Advocates feared this could lead to indefinite separations should the government lose track of where it was sending parents and their children.

Also in October 2025, lawyers for unaccompanied minors in ICE custody began to receive word that their clients would be moved to adult detention facilities after their 18th birthdays. On October 4, U.S. District Judge Rudolph Contreras issued a temporary restraining order finding that ICE policy in violation of his 2021 order directing that such minors be released to the least restrictive setting available on turning 18 as long as they were not a danger to themselves or others and/or a flight risk.

The administration has detained hundreds of children.

==== Liam Conejo Ramos ====
On January 20, 2026, US Immigration and Customs Enforcement (ICE) agents detained Liam Conejo Ramos, a five-year-old boy, on his walk home from school in Columbia Heights, Minnesota, amid the Operation Metro Surge deployment to the Minneapolis–Saint Paul metropolitan area. The child and his father Adrian Conejo Arias each had an active claim for asylum in the United States. ICE claims the father fled and left the child in the car. The family alleges that the father didn't resist, or flee. According to witness statements and the family's attorney, there were multiple adults available to take custody of Liam, but ICE arrested him anyway. ICE's statement was that Liam wasn’t targeted and that an officer stayed with the child while other officers apprehended his father. Officers attempted to get his mother, who was inside the house, to take custody of the boy, indicating she would not be detained for taking custody but she believed the child was being used to lure her out.

According to Spain's El País newspaper, "Images of [Conejo Ramos], wearing his blue hat and carrying a Spider-Man backpack, guarded by federal agents, instantly became a symbol of the indiscriminate nature of President Donald Trump’s immigration crackdown in the United States".

The case has become a cause célèbre, with numerous people expressing outrage on a child being detained by ICE.

=== Citizen detentions ===
Immigration detentions of U.S. citizens in the second Trump administration were caused by U.S. immigration enforcement actions by agencies including Immigration and Customs Enforcement (ICE) and U.S. Customs and Border Protection (CBP) and involved documented cases in which American citizens were stopped, detained, arrested, or held in custody in connection with immigration operations. Reporting based on official records and court filings has described incidents in which enforcement personnel detained people without first confirming citizenship status, and in which citizens were allegedly subjected to enforcement actions later challenged as unlawful or unsupported by accurate official narratives.

Because the federal government did not maintain a comprehensive public count of citizen detentions, totals have largely been reconstructed through investigative reporting and litigation; ProPublica reported at least 506 citizen detentions through September 2026 and described cases involving alleged force and multi-day detention without access to counsel or communication. Commentators and advocacy groups have argued that the pattern of detentions reflects racial profiling and has contributed to some citizens carrying passports or other proof of citizenship within the United States despite there being no general legal requirement to do so. Other reported cases have involved citizens detained during street encounters, workplace actions, and protests, including military veterans arrested during demonstrations against ICE activity.

== See also ==
- 2025 Alvarado ICE facility incident
- 2025 Dallas ICE facility shooting
- List of immigrant detention sites in the United States
- Prisoner rights in the United States
