= Motion to strike =

A motion to strike may refer to:

- Motion to strike (court of law), a legal motion given by one party in a trial requesting the presiding judge order the removal of all or part of the opposing party's pleading to the court
- Motion to strike (United States Congress), an amendment that seeks to delete language from a bill proposed in either the House of Representatives or Senate of the United States Congress, or to delete language from an earlier amendment
