= Kubi gold mine =

Inactive gold mine in Central, Ghana

- The mine in 2019

- Location in Ghana
- Location: Dunkwa-on-Offin,Central Region,Ghana; 6°00′32.4″N 1°43′38.8″W
- Products: Gold
- Production: 58,696 troy ounces
- Financial year: Lifetime
- Opened: 1988
- Active: 1988 to 1996
- Closed: 1998
- Company: Asante Gold Corporation
- Website: Kubi
- Acquired: 2014

The Kubi gold mine is an abandoned open pit mine located 8 kilometres (5.0 mi) northeast of Dunkwa-on-Offin and 22 kilometres (14 mi) south of Obuasi, in Central Region, southern Ghana. It is 180 kilometres (110 mi) northwest of the national capital, Accra.

Historically a site for artisan mining, the mine was explored by BHP from 1988 to 1996. Nevsun Resources explored further in 1996 to 1998 at which point Ashanti Goldfields took over the property and extracted 500,230 tons of ore. Concerns about ecological damage to the protected Supurma Shelterbelft Forest Reserve paused mining in 2000, but it restarted in 2005. The mine is currently owned by Asante Gold Corporation. As of 2022 they are not mining it, despite stating in 2021 that they planned to do so.

== Ecology ==
The mine is located in the Supurma Shelterbelft Forest Reserve, identified as a "protection" area, the most vulnerable of the three classifications under the Forest Ordinance (CAP 157) of Ghana. The Forestry Commission of Ghana has raised the issue that mining in the reserve would jeopardize nearby wildlife, concerns not shared by the government-run Officers of the Chamber of Mines, who maintained that they have exclusive right to grant approval for mining.

== Geology ==
The regional geology is of thick steeply dipping sequences of metasediments, alternating with Proterozoic metavolcanic rocks, all part of the Birimian Supergroup, in northeast trending belts. The Kubi mine lies on the western margin of the Ashanti Gold Belt, at the Birimian-Tarwaian contact.

The Kubi project gold mineralisation is contained in a north-northeast trending shear zone in metasediments. Gold occurs associated with 5–15% pyrite and pyrrhotite, and also as coarse gold in narrow quartz veins, in a garnetiferous alteration zone 1–15 metres thick adjacent to the Birimian-Tarwaian contact. Gold mineralisation also occurs in quartz veins that cross-cut the contact. The mineralised zone has a strike length of at least 2,000 metres (6,600 ft) and is open to below 700 metres (2,300 ft) depth.

== Project history ==
Kubi was explored by BHP from 1988 to 1994, who concentrated drilling in an area of pre-existing artisanal mining.

Nevsun Resources of Canada drilled below the main zone to a new depth of 1.8km in 1996. Core samples produced 4.88 grams per done at 250 metres depth, rising to 5.88 grams per tone elsewhere. Exploration continued by Nevsun until in 1998, when Ashanti Goldfields optioned the property and in 2005. AngloGold Ashanti established two small open pits to mine 500,230 tonnes of shallow oxide ore at a grade of 3.65 g/t gold to recover 58,696 troy ounces. The ore was trucked to AngloGold's plant at Obuasi for processing. Prior to mining AngloGold Ashanti's mineral reserve estimate was 550,455 tonnes at a grade of 3.37 g/t gold, totaling 59,637 troy ounces.

The project has a post-mining estimated measured and indicated mineral resource, dated December 2010, of 1.32 million tonnes of ore at a grade of 5.48 g/t containing 133,000 ounces of gold, below the old open pits. 2% of this resource was classified as "oxide". The remainder was classified as "fresh rock". In 2000, open pit mining was suspended because half of the Kubi deposits were located within a Ghanaian protected forest preserve. In 2002, an Environmental Impact Study was authorized. Mining proceed and in 2005 infilling and partial rehabilitation of the open pits was completed.

In 2021 Mining Journal reported that Asante was planning to redevelop the mine, which still has over 300,000 ounces of gold underground.
