= Government of India v Taylor =

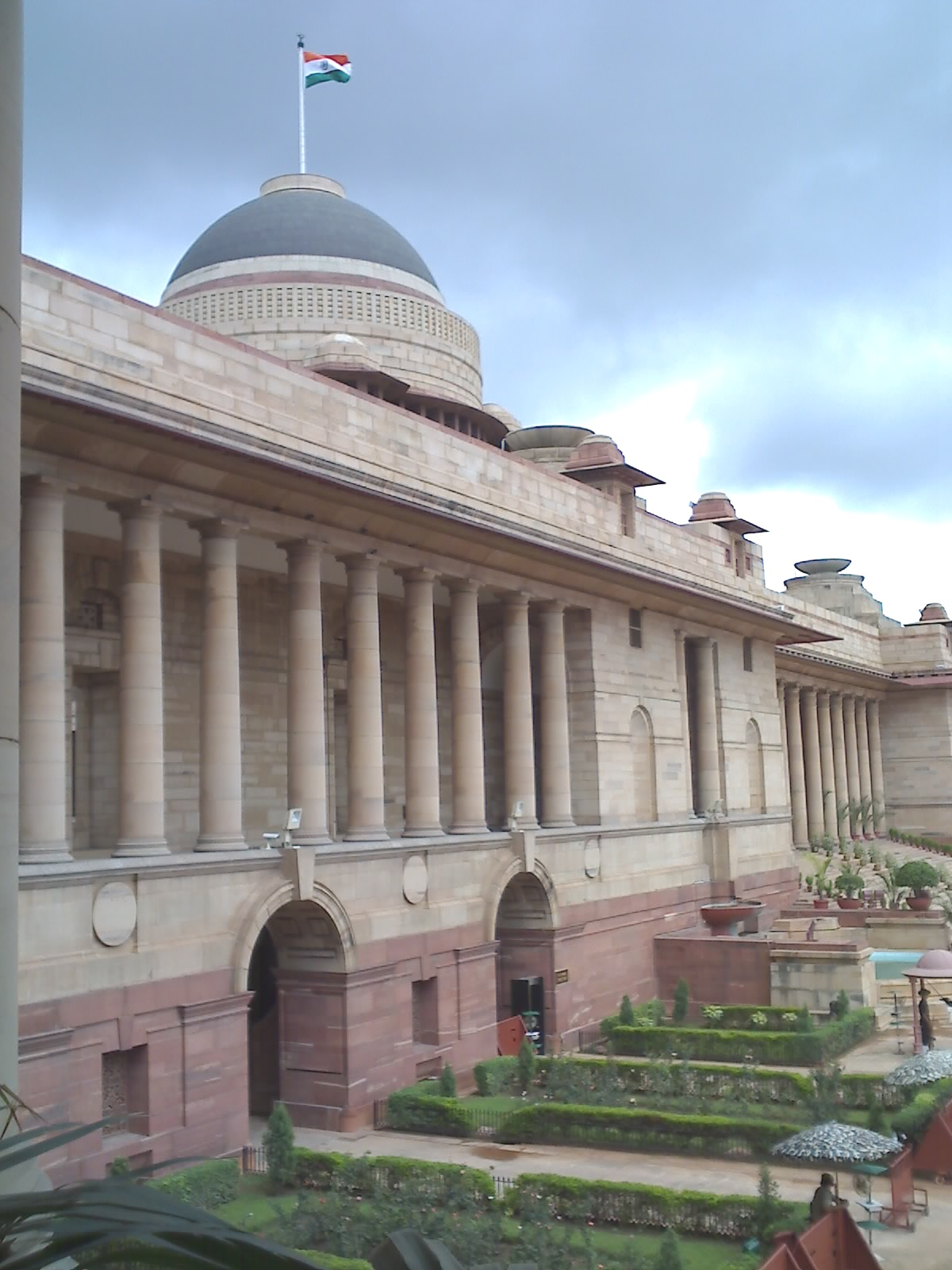
- Court: House of Lords
- Full case name: Government of India v (1) Samuel Henry Taylor and (2) William Deuchars Hume
- Decided: 20 January 1955
- Citations: [1955] AC 491 [1955] 1 All ER 292 (1955) 22 ILR 286

Court membership
- Judges sitting: Viscount Simonds; Lord Morton of Henryton; Lord Reid; Lord Keith of Avonholm; Lord Somervell of Harrow

Keywords
- conflict of laws; tax; act of state doctrine; the "revenue rule"

Government of India v Taylor [1955] AC 491 (sometimes called Re Delhi Electric Supply & Traction Co Ltd) is a judicial decision of the House of Lords relating to the enforceability of foreign tax claims under English law. The House of Lords unanimously upheld the general rule at common law that foreign tax claims are non-justiciable in England under the Act of state doctrine. Accordingly, a claim with respect to foreign taxes was not an admissible claim in the liquidation of a United Kingdom company. The English courts may not, directly or indirectly, enforce the tax claims of another sovereign state.

== Facts ==
The Delhi Electric Supply & Traction Co Ltd was an English company which was formed in 1906. It was incorporated for the purpose of operating an electricity supply and tramway under an operating licence granted by the Municipality of Delhi. The company carried on business in India until approximately 1947 when it sold the whole of its undertakings to the Government of India on 2 March 1947. On 18 April 1947 India passed the Indian Income Tax and Excess Profits Tax (Amendment) Act 1947. On 25 May 1949 the company went into voluntary liquidation. Samuel Taylor and John Lovering were appointed as liquidators, having previously acted as directors of the company. On 24 October 1951 the Commissioner of Income Tax at Delhi served a notice claiming tax on the surplus from the sale of undertaking.

The liquidators rejected the claim, and sought directions from the court as to whether the claim was an admissible claim in the liquidation.

== Judgment ==
The case came before Vaisey J at first instance who dismissed the claim. That decision was upheld by the Court of Appeal (Lord Evershed MR, Jenkins LJ and Morris LJ). The Government of India then appealed to the House of Lords.

The House of Lords held unanimously that the claim failed. Viscount Simonds gave the lead judgment.

My Lords, I will admit that I was greatly surprised to hear it suggested that the courts of this country would and should entertain a suit by a foreign State to recover a tax.

He summarised the general prohibition at common law, citing various earlier cases on point, including King of Hellenes v Broston (1923) 16 Ll L Rep 190, Re Visser [1928] Ch 877 and Sydney Municipal Council v Bull [1909] 1 KB 7. Having cited the general rule, he then discussed the two alternative grounds upon which counsel for the Government of India was arguing that an exception should be made:

- Firstly, that as India was a republic within the Commonwealth, recognising the Queen as Head of the Commonwealth, it should not be treated in the same way as other wholly foreign countries; and
- Secondly, that the general rule applied to natural persons and personal claims - neither consideration should apply to a company in winding-up, which is required to make provision for all claims made against it.

Viscount Simonds rejected both arguments, describing them as "frail weapons with which to attack a strong fortress". He noted that the general common law had tacit Parliamentary approval in the passing of the Foreign Judgments (Reciprocal Enforcement) Act 1933, section 1(2)(b). He ultimately summarily rejected both arguments.

Lord Keith gave a short concurring judgment, specifically endorsing the recent judgment in Peter Buchanan Ltd v McVey [1954] Ir 89 (unreported at the time).

Lord Somervell also gave a short concurring speech, affirming the general statement of Lord Mansfield CJ in Holman v Johnson (1775) 1 Cowp 341 at 343 that "no country ever takes notice of the revenue laws of another." He then went on to state that "after considerable research no case of any country could be found in which taxes due to State A had been enforced in the courts of State B."

== Significance ==
Government of India v Taylor remains good law today. It forms the central basis of Rule 3 of Dicey Morris & Collins on The Conflict of Laws, and is one of the primary authorities cited in support of that rule:

RULE 3 - English courts have no jurisdiction to entertain an action (1) for the enforcement, either directly or indirectly, of a penal, revenue or other public law of a foreign State; or (2) founded upon an act of state.

However it has been qualified by subsequent authorities, including by the Privy Council in Webb v Webb [2020] UKPC 22. In QRS 1 Aps v Frandsen [1999] 1 WLR 2169 it was held that to uphold a contractual indemnity for the payment of taxes would not constitute indirect enforcement of a foreign tax claim.

It has also been noted that in practice the effect of the rule is widely circumvented by international treaties.

== See also ==
- Rule against foreign revenue enforcement
