= Nevsun Resources Ltd v Araya =

Canadian legal decision

- Supreme Court of Canada

Hearing: January 23, 2019 Judgment: February 28, 2020
- Full case name: Nevsun Resources Ltd v Gize Yebeyo Araya, Kesete Tekle Fshazion and Mihretab Yemane Tekle
- Citations: 2020 SCC 5
- Docket No.: 37919
- Prior history: Judgment for Araya et al in the British Columbia Court of Appeal, 2017 BCCA 401; Judgment for Araya et al in the Supreme Court of British Columbia, 2016 BCSC 1856
- Ruling: Appeal dismissed

Holding
- Act of state doctrine not recognized; Customary international law may ground a private law cause of action

Court membership
- Chief Justice: Richard Wagner; Puisne Justices: Rosalie Abella, Michael Moldaver, Andromache Karakatsanis, Clément Gascon, Suzanne Côté, Russell Brown, Malcolm Rowe, Sheilah Martin

Reasons given
- Majority: Abella J, joined by Wagner CJ and Karakatsanis, Gascon, and Martin JJ

Nevsun Resources Ltd v Araya, 2020 SCC 5 is a landmark case in which the Supreme Court of Canada held, in a 5–4 decision, that a private corporation may be liable under Canadian law for breaches of customary international law committed in other countries.

The case concerned human rights violations allegedly committed against workers at an Eritrean mine majority-owned by Nevsun Resources, a Canadian firm. The Supreme Court held that the alleged victims' case against Nevsun could proceed in the courts of British Columbia. It also established that the act of state doctrine is not recognized in Canadian law.

== Background ==
=== Mining and human rights ===
Mining is a significant part of the Canadian economy: approximately 75 percent of the world's mining companies are headquartered in Canada, and 60 percent are listed on the Toronto Stock Exchange. International expansion of the domestic mining industry has been championed by the Canadian government, and one scholar describes Canadian mining operations as having "developed an extensive and indeed dominant global presence." Canadian mining investment abroad has been particularly significant in Latin America and African countries.

Researchers have documented a significant number of human rights violations associated with the operations of Canadian-domiciled mining firms abroad. Victims of alleged abuses have attempted to challenge these violations in Canada through litigation and administrative means since at least the mid-1990s.

Before the Supreme Court's decision in Nevsun, Canadian firms had been described as operating with "effective impunity" with respect to human rights abuses abroad. In other words, if neither Canadian courts, the courts of the country in which the violation occurred, nor international human rights mechanisms are able to provide victims of human rights abuses with redress, the perpetrators of the violation and the companies who employ them would be able to evade legal accountability.

=== Legislation and policy developments ===
The Standing Committee on Foreign Affairs and International Trade of the House of Commons noted such concerns in a June 2005 report. A 2008 report by Oxford's Pro Bono Publico project echoed these observations.

The House of Commons report noted that, although Canadian law did not categorically bar claims by alleged victims of human rights abuses abroad, Canadian courts would likely decline to exercise jurisdiction over such claims according to the forum non conveniens doctrine. In Canada, forum non conveniens permits a domestic court to stay an action when it determines that a court in another jurisdiction is "clearly" the more appropriate forum in which to hear the case. Thus, in the mining context, an action in a Canadian court would likely be stayed in favour of the courts of the country in which the alleged abuse occurred.

The Martin government failed to implement the House of Commons report's recommendations with respect to domestic law, although it and subsequent governments did advocate for John Ruggie's efforts to enhance corporate responsibility for human rights as Special Representative of the Secretary-General. Subsequent domestic efforts including Bill C-300, which would have created a mechanism to revoke federal funding from companies whose conduct did not conform to human rights and environmental best practices, were defeated.

In March 2009, by Order in Council, the federal government implemented a policy document titled "Building the Canadian Advantage," which created certain mechanisms to enhance the corporate social responsibility of Canadian firms operating abroad. However, it did not require companies to comply with human rights guidelines.

In January 2018, the federal government created the Canadian Ombudsperson for Responsible Enterprise, a successor to the Extractive Sector Corporate Social Responsibility Counsellor (created by the same Order in Council as that which implemented "Building the Canadian Advantage"). The Ombudsperson is empowered to investigate alleged human rights violations involving Canadian firms operating outside Canada.

=== International commitments and obligations ===
Canada is a member of the International Labour Organization, which condemns forced labour pursuant to the Declaration on Fundamental Principles and Rights at Work. It is also party to several treaties that outlaw forced labour and related human rights violations, including slavery and human trafficking.

== Decision ==
=== Facts ===
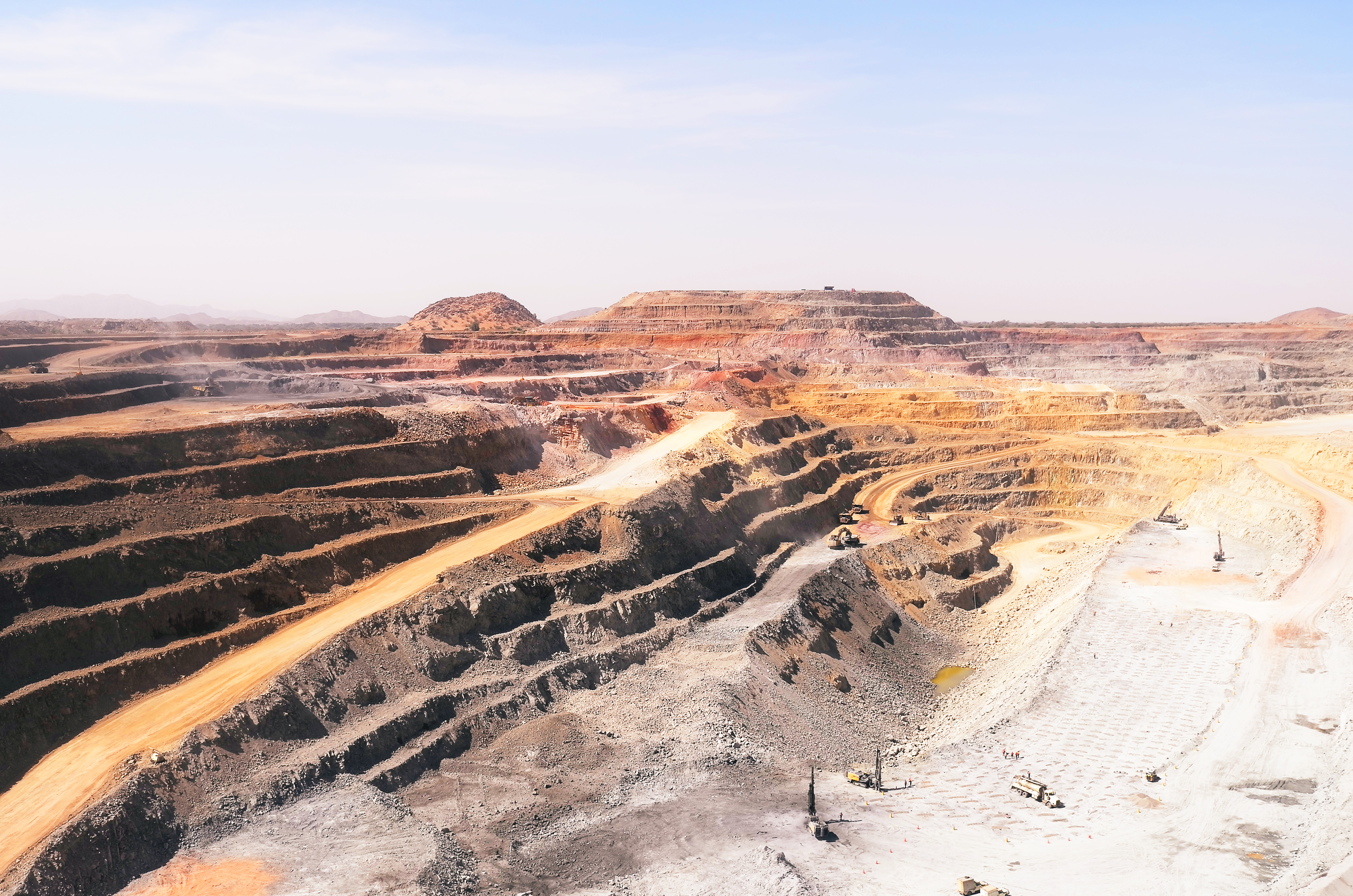
The Bisha Mine in Eritrea, where the Nevsun plaintiffs worked.

Nevsun Resources Ltd (Nevsun)—later acquired by Zijin Mining—was a mining firm incorporated under British Columbia law and headquartered in Vancouver, British Columbia. It held a 60 percent stake in Bisha Mining Share Company (BMSC). BMSC was the operating company of Bisha Mine, located in Eritrea. As the majority owner of BMSC, Nevsun was the parent company of BMSC and BMSC was Nevsun's subsidiary.

Several former labourers at the Bisha Mine came to Canada as refugees. In November 2014, they brought a class action against Nevsun in the Supreme Court of British Columbia claiming damages in tort and for breach of customary international law. The action was the first Canadian lawsuit alleging violations of customary international law to reach the trial stage.

In their complaint, the labourers alleged that they and other members of the proposed class had been subjected to various human rights violations, including "the use of forced labour; torture; slavery; cruel, inhuman or degrading treatment; and crimes against humanity" while working at the mine from 2008 to 2012. The workers alleged that they had been engaged by sub-contractors of the mine's operating company under a policy of military conscription in Eritrea known as the National Service Program. In addition to requiring military service, the Program also requires conscripts to work on certain infrastructure projects.

Abuses similar to those alleged by the Nevsun plaintiffs have been independently reported by human rights groups including Human Rights Watch. The United Nations has alleged that significant human rights violations have occurred in Eritrea since 1991.

=== Procedural history ===
At trial, Nevsun brought a motion to strike the labourers' claim. It made three arguments.

First, it argued that Eritrea was the more appropriate forum to hear the claim, based on the doctrine of forum non conveniens.

Alternatively, it argued that the act of state doctrine—a doctrine of subject-matter jurisdiction similar to state immunity that has been adopted in a number of common law countries—prevented the trial court from considering the plaintiffs' claim. In the words of one legal scholar, the act of state doctrine "extends deference to the executive branch in the conduct of foreign affairs by discouraging, if not outright precluding, courts from adjudicating the legitimacy of a foreign act." Thus, Nevsun submitted, the government of Eritrea—and not Nevsun—was ultimately responsible for the acts giving rise to the plaintiffs' claims.

Finally, Nevsun argued that the relevant provisions of customary international law could not apply to corporations.

The trial court rejected all three arguments. In particular, it held that the act of state doctrine—although, in the trial court's view, it was part of Canadian common law—was not engaged in the case. However, the trial court did refuse to certify the class action, meaning that the plaintiffs could only proceed with the suit on their own behalf. On appeal by Nevsun on the other issues, the Court of Appeal largely agreed with the trial court in a unanimous opinion.

=== Reasons of the Court ===
Nevsun further appealed to the Supreme Court of Canada. The Supreme Court granted Nevsun leave to appeal on June 14, 2018 and heard oral argument on January 23, 2019. Nevsun appealed only on the act of state doctrine and customary international law issues, and not the forum non conveniens point.

The court divided on both issues. Seven of nine judges held that the act of state doctrine was not part of Canadian law. Five held that the plaintiffs' claims based on customary international law could proceed. Thus, the case was remanded back to the Supreme Court of British Columbia to proceed to trial.

==== Majority ====
Justice Rosalie Abella held for the majority that the claims could proceed. She held that the act of state doctrine is unknown to Canadian law. Rather, Canadian courts treat the two issues covered by the doctrine—namely, judicial restraint on foreign law matters and the conflict of laws—separately.

Justice Abella further held that the plaintiffs' claims based on customary international law could, in principle, ground a private law cause of action in Canadian courts, for several reasons. First, the claims were based on legal principles against forced labour that constitute jus cogens—broadly recognized principles of customary international law. Second, Canadian domestic law incorporates international law, via the common law doctrine of adoption, unless the relevant international law norm has been abrogated by statute. And third, customary international law can bind corporations, and not states alone.

However, as the case went to the Supreme Court on a preliminary procedural matter, Justice Abella did not determine whether the Nevsun plaintiffs had in fact established Nevsun's liability for the human rights abuses they had allegedly suffered. She determined only that the case could proceed to trial.

In a passage quoted by several commentators, Justice Abella began her opinion as follows:

This appeal involves the application of modern international human rights law, the phoenix that rose from the ashes of World War II and declared global war on human rights abuses. Its mandate was to prevent breaches of internationally accepted norms. Those norms were not meant to be theoretical aspirations or legal luxuries, but moral imperatives and legal necessities. Conduct that undermined the norms was to be identified and addressed.

In conclusion, Justice Abella wrote that:

Customary international law is part of Canadian law. Nevsun is a company bound by Canadian law. It is not “plain and obvious” (Note: Here, Justice Abella refers to the test for when a pleading may be struck out. The Supreme Court has held that pleadings may be struck only when it is "plain and obvious" that they have "no reasonable prospect of success." See Nevsun SCC at para 64, citing R v Imperial Tobacco Canada Ltd, 2011 SCC 42 at para 17 and Odhavji Estate v Woodhouse, 2003 SCC 69 at paras 14–15.) to me that the Eritrean workers’ claims against Nevsun based on breaches of customary international law cannot succeed. Those claims should therefore be allowed to proceed.

==== Dissents ====
Two dissents were filed in the case, one by Justices Russell Brown and Malcolm Rowe and one by Justices Suzanne Côté and Michael Moldaver.

Justices Brown and Rowe dissented only on the customary international law issue, arguing that corporations cannot be held liable in a civil suit for alleged breaches of international legal norms and that the appropriate remedies for breaches of such norms should be provided for by statute, not the common law.

Justices Côté and Moldaver dissented on both issues. While they generally agreed with the analysis of Justices Brown and Rowe with respect to the customary international law issue, they would have held that the act of state doctrine did bar the plaintiffs' claims.

All the dissenters critiqued what they saw as the majority's disregard for precedent in recognizing a civil cause of action for breach of international law. They noted that "[the majority] cites no cases where a corporation has been held civilly liable for breaches of customary international law anywhere in the world, and we do not know of any."

== Commentary ==
William S. Dodge, a professor at UC Davis School of Law, noted that Nevsun represents part of a "trend" in which countries around the world, including the United Kingdom and the Netherlands, have opened the door to holding corporations liable in their domestic courts for violations of international law.

Lawyers at Norton Rose Fulbright opined that "[t]he majority judgment … sends a strong signal to the Canadian business community that consideration for human rights norms in all of their activities, whether at home or abroad, must form an integral part of their legal and business planning."

Rachel Howie, a partner at Dentons, writing before Nevsun was decided, observed that the plaintiffs' claims in the case were "unlike any claim previously determined in Canada," in that they concerned the acts in a foreign country of a corporation—a private entity—and not a state.

== See also ==
- Alien Tort Statute
- Corporate social responsibility

== Bibliography ==
=== Caselaw ===
- Araya v Nevsun Resources Ltd, 2016 BCSC 1856 [Nevsun BCSC]
- Nevsun Resources Ltd v Araya, 2020 SCC 5 [Nevsun SCC]

=== Secondary sources ===
- Butler, Paula (2015). Colonial Extractions: Race and Canadian Mining in Contemporary Africa. Toronto: University of Toronto Press. ISBN 9781442619951.
- Coumans, Catherine (2010). "Alternative Accountability Mechanisms and Mining: The Problems of Effective Impunity, Human Rights, and Agency". Canadian Journal of Development Studies. 30 (1–2): 27–48. doi:10.1080/02255189.2010.9669280. ISSN 0225-5189. S2CID 153902709.
- Hansell, Jolene (2018). "Case Note: Case of Araya v. Nevsun Resources Ltd in the Canadian Courts". Genocide Studies and Prevention. 12 (3): 177–81. doi:10.5038/1911-9933.12.3.1639.
- Janda, Richard (2010). "Note: An Act Respecting Corporate Accountability for the Activities of Mining, Oil or Gas in Developing Countries (Bill C-300): Anatomy of a Failed Initiative". McGill Journal of Sustainable Development Law. 6 (2): 97–107. 2010 CanLIIDocs 58 – via CanLII.
- Lauzon, Jolane T. (2018). "Araya v. Nevsun Resources: Remedies for Victims of Human Rights Violations Committed by Canadian Mining Companies Abroad". Revue québécoise de droit international. 31 (1): 143–69. doi:10.7202/1065030ar. 2018 CanLIIDocs 10660 – via CanLII.
- Seck, Sarah L. (2011). "Canadian Mining Internationally and the UN Guiding Principles for Business and Human Rights". Canadian Yearbook of International Law. 49: 51–116. doi:10.1017/S0069005800010328. S2CID 155412368 – via HeinOnline.
