= Rule against foreign revenue enforcement =

Rule against enforcing international tax

The rule against foreign revenue enforcement, often abbreviated to the revenue rule, is a general legal principle that the courts of one country will not enforce the tax laws of another country. The rule is part of the conflict of laws rules developed at common law, and forms part of the act of state doctrine.

In State of Colorado v. Harbeck, 133 N.E. 357, 360 (N.Y. 1921) the court referred to

The ... well-settled principle of private international law which precludes one state from acting as a collector of taxes for a sister state and from enforcing its penal or revenue laws as such. The rule is universally recognized that the revenue laws of one state have no force in another.

In England, Lord Denning MR said in Att-Gen of New Zealand v Ortiz [1984] AC 1 at 20:

No one has ever doubted that our courts will not entertain a suit brought by a foreign sovereign, directly or indirectly, to enforce the penal or revenue laws of that foreign state. We do not sit to collect taxes for another country or to inflict punishments for it.

The rule has been repeatedly applied in the United Kingdom, the United States, Canada, Australia, Ireland, Singapore, and other countries. It has also been codified into statute in various countries.

== History of the rule ==
The earliest reported case on the rule is believed to be Attorney General v Lutwydge (1729) Bumb 280, 145 ER 674. In that case, the English courts refused to enforce a bond for Scottish tobacco duties. In 1775 Lord Mansfield CJ pronounced in Holman v Johnson (1775) 1 Cowp 341 at 343, 98 ER 1120 at 1121 that "no country ever takes notice of the revenue laws of another". In 1779 he repeated that position in Planche v Fletcher (1779) 1 Douglas 251, 99 ER 164.

== English law ==
Although the rule had been referred to an applied in a number of English cases from as early as 1729, the rule itself was not considered beyond doubt in England until the decision of the House of Lords in Government of India v Taylor [1955] AC 491. In that case the House of Lords unanimously upheld the Court of Appeal (who had in turn unanimously upheld the trial judge) that the liquidator of an English company could not pay out sums to a foreign government because the tax claim was not justiciable in England.

The rule as it applies under English law is summarised in Dicey Morris & Collins at Rule 3:

RULE 3 - English courts have no jurisdiction to entertain an action (1) for the enforcement, either directly or indirectly, of a penal, revenue or other public law of a foreign State; or (2) founded upon an act of state.

In Re State of Norway's Application (No 2) [1990] 1 AC 723 the Norwegian government sought assistance from the English courts in collecting evidence in relation to a tax claim. The respondent resisted the application on the basis that it violated the revenue rule, but the House of Lords held that assisting with the collection of evidence would not violate the rule. Lord Goff said "It is of importance to observe that that rule is limited to cases of direct or indirect enforcement in this country of the revenue laws of a foreign state. It is plain that the present case is not concerned with the direct enforcement of the revenue laws of the State of Norway. Is it concerned with their indirect enforcement? I do not think so."

In QRS 1 Aps v Frandsen [1999] 1 WLR 2169 it was held that to uphold a contractual provision between two private contracting parties for an indemnity against the payment of foreign taxes would not constitute an indirect enforcement of a foreign tax claim, and so was enforceable.

== United States ==
The revenue rule has been repeatedly applied by courts in the United States. The rule was first applied in the United States in 1806 in Ludlow v. Van Rensselaer, 1 Johns. R. 94 (N.Y. 1806).

Initially the rule was also applied to claims for taxes made by other states within the US. In Maryland v. Turner, 132 N.Y. 173, 174 (1911) the courts of New York state refused to enforce a judgment debt relating to taxes due in Maryland. In Colorado v. Harbeck, 133 N.E. 357, 360 (N.Y. 1921) it was held that there was a "well-settled principle of private international law which precludes one state from acting as a collector of taxes for a sister state and from enforcing its penal or revenue laws as such. The rule is universally recognized that the revenue laws of one state have no force in another." However, in Moore v. Mitchell, 30 F.2d 600, 600 (2d Cir. 1929) the U.S. Supreme Court limited the application of the rule in the interstate context.

In Milwaukee County v. M. E. White Co., 296 U.S. 268, 268 (1935) the Supreme Court was asked to consider whether revenue laws of other states should be enforced under the Full Faith and Credit Clause. The Supreme Court declined to extend the full faith and credit provision to revenue statutes themselves, but limited its ruling to enforcement of tax judgments handed down in the courts of other states.

== Canada ==
The Supreme Court of Canada has upheld and applied the revenue rule in United States v. Harden [1963] SCR 366.

== Civil law jurisdictions ==
Civil law (as opposed to common law) jurisdictions will not generally entertain foreign tax claims on the basis that they are public laws, and therefore cannot be enforced outside of the state or territory. In the Swedish case of Bulgariska Staten v Takvorian (NJA 1954 s.268) the court held "a state cannot use a Swedish court to collect taxes or to have other contributions made to a foreign state".

== European Union ==
The rule has been partially abrogated within the European Union by article 39 of the Insolvency Regulation (Council Regulation (EC) No 1346/2000).

Any creditor who has his habitual residence, domicile or registered office in a Member State other than the State of the opening of proceedings, including the tax authorities and social security authorities of Member States, shall have the right to lodge claims in the insolvency proceedings in writing (emphasis added).

== Criticism ==
The rule has been subjected to criticism. Professor Adrian Briggs of Oxford University has criticised it on the basis that it promotes the evasion of tax liabilities. Another commentator has called it "anachronistic and destructive". But other commentators have defended it, both as a matter of practice and principle.

== Abrogation ==
Nations can, and do, abrogate the rule on a bilateral basis by treaty. In Ben Nevis (Holdings) Limited v HMRC [2013] EWCA Civ 578 the English courts enforced a claim for South African taxes under a bilateral treaty between the countries.

However, whilst treaties to share information relating to taxable liabilities are common, or for relief from double taxation, treaties empowering nations to enforce each other's tax law are relatively uncommon. Brenda Mallinak records that in 2006 the United States had only five such treaties, despite having a large number of international treaties for tax information exchange. On 28 January 2003, the OECD Model Tax Convention on Income and Capital was modified to include a new Article 27 as a model for comprehensive collection assistance in treaty negotiations.
