= Aliens.gov =

United States government website

aliens.gov
- Website type: US government
- Available in: English
- Owner: Federal government of the United States
- Website: www.whitehouse.gov/aliens/; aliens.gov (redirect link); alien.gov (redirect link)
- Commercial: No
- Launched: May 28, 2026; 3 months ago
- Current status: Active

aliens.gov is a United States government website launched by the second Trump administration in May 2026 and features information about immigrants arrested during the administration. The website is hosted by the official White House domain, whitehouse.gov.

The title of the website, along with its language and visuals associated with extraterrestrial aliens or UFOs, are an apparent reference to the Trump Administration's earlier efforts to declassify information about the presence of extraterrestrial life.

== History ==
The website was launched on May 28, 2026, with a teaser video on X captioned "They walk among us", referring to the presence of extraterrestrial aliens.

The website includes an interactive map using Immigration and Customs Enforcement (ICE) data showing the number of immigrant arrests nationwide. It also includes a tip line to report alien "encounters" to ICE.

== Reaction ==
The website has been condemned by immigrant rights groups, who criticized its use of "invasion rhetoric" to dehumanize and demonize migrants.

== See also ==
- whitehouse.gov, the official website of the White House
