= Act of state doctrine =

Legal doctrine

The act-of-state doctrine is a principle in international law whereby acts done by a state in its own territory cannot be challenged by the national courts of another state. The doctrine covers legislative action by foreign states and also executive actions relating to state-owned property.

As a principle of federal common law in the United States it states, in circumstances where it applies, that courts in the United States will not rule on the validity of another government's (formal) sovereign act with respect to property located within the latter's own territory. The act-of-state doctrine enters consideration most often in cases where a foreign sovereign has expropriated the property of a U.S. national located in that foreign territory (e.g. through nationalization).

== United States law ==
=== Background ===
The act of state doctrine entered into American jurisprudence in the case Underhill v. Hernandez, 168 U.S. 250 (1897). In an 1892 revolution, General José Manuel "Mocho" Hernández expelled the existing Venezuelan government and took control of Ciudad Bolívar, where plaintiff Underhill lived and ran a waterworks system for the city. Underhill, an American citizen, repeatedly applied to Hernández for an exit passport, but his requests were refused, and Underhill was forced to stay in Ciudad Bolívar and run the waterworks. Hernández finally relented and allowed Underhill to return to the United States, where he instituted an action to recover damages for his detention in Venezuela. In finding for the defendant, a New York Court determined that Hernández had acted in his official capacity as a military commander so his actions were those of the Venezuelan government. The court therefore refused to hear Underhill's claim against the government based on the act of state doctrine. The court reasoned, "Every sovereign state is bound to respect the independence of every other sovereign state, and the courts of one country will not sit in judgment on the acts of the government of another, done within its own territory."

=== Banco Nacional de Cuba v. Sabbatino ===
In Banco Nacional de Cuba v. Sabbatino, 376 U.S. 398 (1964), the United States Supreme Court applied the act of state doctrine even where the state action likely violated international law. The case arose when Cuba nationalized its sugar industry, taking control of sugar refineries and other companies in the wake of the Cuban revolution. A large number of Americans who had invested in those companies lost their investments without compensation when the Cuban government assumed control. However, despite the loss suffered by United States nationals, the Supreme Court upheld the act of state doctrine by assuming the validity of Cuba's domestic action and therefore rejected the claim of US nationals against Cuba for their lost investments. The Sabbatino court reformulated the basis for the act of state doctrine emphasizing that it has "constitutional underpinnings" in the concept of separation of powers. The Supreme Court reasoned that because there were no settled international standards (in 1964) for governing disputes relating to foreign expropriations such disputes should not be settled by the Judiciary because those decisions could interfere with the Executive's conduct of foreign affairs. Banco Nacional de Cuba v. Sabbatino, 376 U.S. 398 (1964). The Sabbatino decision is extremely controversial and doctrinal differences, administrative practice and numerous judicial exceptions complicate application of the doctrine in the United States.

=== Second Hickenlooper Amendment ===
In response to the outcome of the case, Congress enacted 22 U.S.C. § 2370(e)(2), more commonly referred to as the "Second Hickenlooper Amendment", named after the bill's sponsor, Bourke B. Hickenlooper, an Iowa Senator. Generally, under the Hickenlooper Amendment, courts are not to apply the act of state doctrine as a bar against hearing cases of expropriation by a foreign sovereign. There is an exception if the Executive requests that the courts consider the act of state doctrine because foreign policy interests may be damaged by judicial interference:

this subparagraph shall not be applicable ... (2) in any case with respect to which the President determines that application of the act of state doctrine is required in that particular case by the foreign policy interests of the United States and a suggestion to this effect is filed on his behalf in that case with the court.

== English law ==
The foreign act of state doctrine applies in English law. In April 2018, the English Commercial Court ruled that it also applies in English arbitration.

== Canadian law ==
In Nevsun Resources Ltd v Araya (2020), the Supreme Court of Canada established that the act of state doctrine does not apply in Canadian law. Instead, the jurisprudence of conflict of laws and judicial restraint has "completely subsumed" the act of state doctrine.

== Eichmann trial ==
While on trial in Israel for crimes committed during the Holocaust, Adolf Eichmann's lawyers pleaded immunity on the basis that the acts he committed were acts of state. The Israeli Supreme Court rejected this defense, stating:

[T]here is no basis for the doctrine when the matter pertains to acts prohibited by the law of nations, especially when they are international crimes of the class of "crimes against humanity" (in the wider sense). Of such odious acts it must be said that in point of international law they are completely outside the “sovereign” jurisdiction of the State that ordered or ratified their commission, and therefore those who participated in such acts must personally account for them and cannot shelter behind the official character of their task or mission, or behind the “Laws” of the State by virtue of which they purported to act.

== See also ==
- Comity
- Rule against foreign revenue enforcement
