= Bram v. United States =

- Supreme Court of the United States

Argued October 18–19, 1897 Decided December 13, 1897
- Full case name: Bram v. United States
- Citations: 168 U.S. 532 (more)

Court membership
- Chief Justice Melville Fuller Associate Justices John M. Harlan · Horace Gray; David J. Brewer · Henry B. Brown; George Shiras Jr. · Edward D. White; Rufus W. Peckham

Case opinions
- Majority: White
- Dissent: Brewer, joined by Fuller, Brown

Bram v. United States, 168 U.S. 532 (1897), was a United States Supreme Court case that ruled that an alleged confession to a crime, in order to be admissible, must not be obtained by threats or violence, nor by any direct or implied promises, however slight. The decision was based on the Fifth Amendment to the US Constitution, which meant that confessions deemed involuntary were excluded from federal criminal trials.

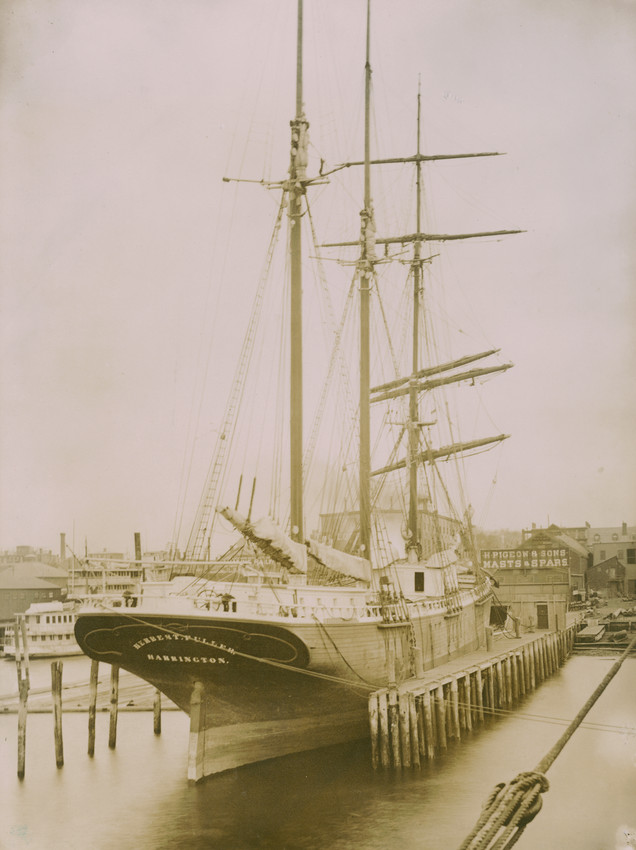
Barkentine ship Herbert Fuller at wharf in East Boston "at time of trial for the murder of the captain"

== Axe murder on a ship ==
The case involved a triple murder by axe, on a ship out of Boston, with three surviving suspects. It is considered a mystery that passenger Lester Monks, a Harvard dropout who emerged alone from the crime scene where the axe was stored, was never arrested. He implicated Thomas Bram, the first mate from St Kitts. En route to the nearest port, Halifax in Canada, a Swedish sailor known as Charley Brown was put under arrest. He then claimed to have seen Bram commit murder, so Bram was put under arrest.

== Involuntary confession by Bram ==
On shore, police detective Power spoke to Brown, then went to Bram and told him Brown saw into the cabin from the wheel, seeing Bram killing the captain. Power would testify that Bram implicated himself by replying that Brown could not have seen from the wheel. The Supreme Court held that Power's words were accusations (Power had confined and stripped Bram) which caused Bram to feel he had to defend himself, thus his statement was not voluntary.

== Reconviction of Bram and presidential pardon by Woodrow Wilson ==
Bram was reconvicted after the Supreme Court decision, but given parole in 1913, and a pardon by president Woodrow Wilson in 1919.
