= List of United States Supreme Court cases, volume 168 =

Supreme Court of the United States
- Interactive map of Supreme Court of the United States
- 38°53′26″N 77°00′16″W
- Established: March 4, 1789; 236 years ago
- Location: Washington, D.C.
- Coordinates: 38°53′26″N 77°00′16″W
- Composition method: Presidential nomination with Senate confirmation
- Authorised by: Constitution of the United States, Art. III, § 1
- Judge term length: life tenure, subject to impeachment and removal
- Number of positions: 9 (by statute)
- Website: supremecourt.gov

This is a list of cases reported in volume 168 of United States Reports, decided by the Supreme Court of the United States in 1897 and 1898.

== Justices of the Supreme Court at the time of volume 168 U.S. ==
The Supreme Court is established by Article III, Section 1 of the Constitution of the United States, which says: "The judicial Power of the United States, shall be vested in one supreme Court . . .". The size of the Court is not specified; the Constitution leaves it to Congress to set the number of justices. Under the Judiciary Act of 1789 Congress originally fixed the number of justices at six (one chief justice and five associate justices). Since 1789 Congress has varied the size of the Court from six to seven, nine, ten, and back to nine justices (always including one chief justice).

When the cases in volume 168 were decided the Court comprised the following nine members:

Portrait	Justice	Office	Home State	Succeeded	Date confirmed by the Senate (Vote)	Tenure on Supreme Court
	Melville Fuller	Chief Justice	Illinois	Morrison Waite	July 20, 1888 (41–20)	October 8, 1888 – July 4, 1910 (Died)
	Stephen Johnson Field	Associate Justice	California	newly created seat	March 10, 1863 (Acclamation)	May 10, 1863 – December 1, 1897 (Retired)
	John Marshall Harlan	Associate Justice	Kentucky	David Davis	November 29, 1877 (Acclamation)	December 10, 1877 – October 14, 1911 (Died)
	Horace Gray	Associate Justice	Massachusetts	Nathan Clifford	December 20, 1881 (51–5)	January 9, 1882 – September 15, 1902 (Died)
	David Josiah Brewer	Associate Justice	Kansas	Stanley Matthews	December 18, 1889 (53–11)	January 6, 1890 – March 28, 1910 (Died)
	Henry Billings Brown	Associate Justice	Michigan	Samuel Freeman Miller	December 29, 1890 (Acclamation)	January 5, 1891 – May 28, 1906 (Retired)
	George Shiras Jr.	Associate Justice	Pennsylvania	Joseph P. Bradley	July 26, 1892 (Acclamation)	October 10, 1892 – February 23, 1903 (Retired)
	Edward Douglass White	Associate Justice	Louisiana	Samuel Blatchford	February 19, 1894 (Acclamation)	March 12, 1894 – December 18, 1910 (Continued as chief justice)
	Rufus W. Peckham	Associate Justice	New York	Howell Edmunds Jackson	December 9, 1895 (Acclamation)	January 6, 1896 – October 24, 1909 (Died)

== Citation style ==
Under the Judiciary Act of 1789 the federal court structure at the time comprised District Courts, which had general trial jurisdiction; Circuit Courts, which had mixed trial and appellate (from the US District Courts) jurisdiction; and the United States Supreme Court, which had appellate jurisdiction over the federal District and Circuit courts—and for certain issues over state courts. The Supreme Court also had limited original jurisdiction (i.e., in which cases could be filed directly with the Supreme Court without first having been heard by a lower federal or state court). There were one or more federal District Courts and/or Circuit Courts in each state, territory, or other geographical region.

The Judiciary Act of 1891 created the United States Courts of Appeals and reassigned the jurisdiction of most routine appeals from the district and circuit courts to these appellate courts. The Act created nine new courts that were originally known as the "United States Circuit Courts of Appeals." The new courts had jurisdiction over most appeals of lower court decisions. The Supreme Court could review either legal issues that a court of appeals certified or decisions of court of appeals by writ of certiorari.

Bluebook citation style is used for case names, citations, and jurisdictions.

- "# Cir." = United States Court of Appeals
  - e.g., "3d Cir." = United States Court of Appeals for the Third Circuit
- "C.C.D." = United States Circuit Court for the District of . . .
  - e.g.,"C.C.D.N.J." = United States Circuit Court for the District of New Jersey
- "D." = United States District Court for the District of . . .
  - e.g.,"D. Mass." = United States District Court for the District of Massachusetts
- "E." = Eastern; "M." = Middle; "N." = Northern; "S." = Southern; "W." = Western
  - e.g.,"C.C.S.D.N.Y." = United States Circuit Court for the Southern District of New York
  - e.g.,"M.D. Ala." = United States District Court for the Middle District of Alabama
- "Ct. Cl." = United States Court of Claims
- The abbreviation of a state's name alone indicates the highest appellate court in that state's judiciary at the time.
  - e.g.,"Pa." = Supreme Court of Pennsylvania
  - e.g.,"Me." = Supreme Judicial Court of Maine

== List of cases in volume 168 U.S. ==
Case Name	Page & year	Opinion of the Court	Concurring opinion(s)	Dissenting opinion(s)	Lower Court	Disposition
Southern P.R.R. Co. v. United States	1 (1897)	Harlan	none	none	9th Cir.	affirmed
Bergere v. United States	66 (1897)	Peckham	none	none	Ct. Priv. Land Cl.	reversed
Alaska T.G.M. Co. v. Whelan	86 (1897)	Gray	none	none	9th Cir.	reversed
Turner v. New York	90 (1897)	Gray	none	none	N.Y.	affirmed
United States v. Goldenberg	95 (1897)	Brewer	none	none	2d Cir.	certification
Compania de Navigacion v. Brauer	104 (1897)	Gray	none	none	2d Cir.	affirmed
Craemer v. Washington	124 (1897)	Fuller	none	none	C.C.D. Wash.	affirmed
Miller v. Cornwall R.R. Co.	131 (1897)	Fuller	none	none	Pa.	dismissed
Fletcher v. Baltimore & P.R.R. Co.	135 (1897)	Peckham	none	none	D.C. Cir.	reversed
ICC v. Alabama M. Ry. Co.	144 (1897)	Shiras	none	Harlan	5th Cir.	affirmed
Chaves v. United States	177 (1897)	Fuller	none	none	Ct. Priv. Land Cl.	affirmed
Zia Pueblo v. United States	198 (1897)	Brown	none	none	Ct. Priv. Land Cl.	affirmed
Crespin v. United States	208 (1897)	Brown	none	none	Ct. Priv. Land Cl.	affirmed
Roff v. Burney	218 (1897)	Brewer	none	none	U.S. Ct. Ind. Terr.	reversed
City of Ogden v. Armstrong	224 (1897)	Shiras	none	none	Sup. Ct. Terr. Utah	multiple
Dennison v. United States	241 (1897)	Brown	none	none	Ct. Cl.	affirmed
Underhill v. Hernandez	250 (1897)	Fuller	none	none	2d Cir.	affirmed
Pratt v. Paris G.L. & C. Co.	255 (1897)	Brown	none	none	Ill.	affirmed
Hodgson v. Vermont	262 (1897)	Shiras	none	none	Vt.	affirmed
United States v. Wilson	273 (1897)	Peckham	none	none	Ct. Cl.	reversed
Holtzman v. Douglas	278 (1897)	Peckham	none	none	D.C. Cir.	affirmed
O'Brien v. Miller	287 (1897)	White	none	none	2d Cir.	reversed
Harrison v. Perea	311 (1897)	Peckham	none	none	Sup. Ct. Terr. N.M.	reversed
Karrick v. Hannaman	328 (1897)	Gray	none	none	Sup. Ct. Terr. Utah	affirmed
Warner v. Baltimore & O.R.R. Co.	339 (1897)	White	none	none	D.C. Cir.	reversed
St. Anthony F.W.P. Co. v. St. Paul W. Comm'rs	349 (1897)	Peckham	none	none	Minn.	affirmed
United States v. Crosthwaite	375 (1897)	Harlan	none	none	Ct. Cl.	reversed
Williams v. United States	382 (1897)	Harlan	none	none	N.D. Cal.	reversed
Nobles v. Georgia	398 (1897)	White	none	none	Ga.	affirmed
The Victory	410 (1897)	Fuller	none	none	4th Cir.	reversed
Muse v. Arlington H. Co.	430 (1897)	Fuller	none	none	C.C.E.D. Ark.	dismissed
The Resolute	437 (1897)	Brown	none	none	C.C.D. Or.	affirmed
The William M. Hoag	443 (1897)	Brown	none	none	C.C.D. Or.	affirmed
Stewart v. Baltimore & O.R.R. Co.	445 (1897)	Brewer	none	none	D.C. Cir.	reversed
Thompson v. Maxwell L.G. & Ry. Co.	451 (1897)	Brewer	none	none	Sup. Ct. Terr. N.M.	affirmed
Hyer v. Richmond T. Co.	471 (1897)	Brewer	Harlan	Brown	4th Cir.	decree modified
Douglas v. Kentucky	488 (1897)	Harlan	none	none	Ky.	affirmed
United States v. Union P. Ry. Co.	505 (1897)	Fuller	none	none	8th Cir.	dismissed
Springer L. Ass'n v. Ford	513 (1897)	Fuller	none	none	Sup. Ct. Terr. N.M.	affirmed
Bram v. United States	532 (1897)	White	none	Brewer	C.C.D. Mass.	reversed
Adams v. Henderson	573 (1897)	Harlan	none	none	Sup. Ct. Terr. Utah	affirmed
In re Tampa S.R.R. Co.	583 (1897)	Fuller	none	none	C.C.S.D. Fla.	certiorari denied
Michigan L. & L. Co. v. Rust	589 (1897)	Brewer	none	none	6th Cir.	affirmed
Northern P.R.R. Co. v. Musser S.L.L. & M. Co.	604 (1897)	Brewer	none	none	7th Cir.	affirmed
Wilson v. Lambert	611 (1897)	Shiras	none	none	D.C. Cir.	reversed
Shepard v. Adams	618 (1897)	Shiras	none	none	C.C.D. Colo.	affirmed
Highland A. & B.R.R. Co. v. Columbian E. Co.	627 (1897)	Brewer	none	none	5th Cir.	certification
Hall v. United States	632 (1897)	Peckham	none	none	C.C.S.D.N.Y.	affirmed
Crossley v. California	640 (1897)	Fuller	none	none	C.C.N.D. Cal.	affirmed
Conde v. York	642 (1897)	Fuller	none	none	N.Y. Sup. Ct.	dismissed
McHenry v. Alford	651 (1898)	Peckham	none	none	8th Cir.	certification
Castillo v. McConnico	674 (1898)	White	none	none	La.	dismissed
Penn M.L. Ins. Co. v. City of Austin	685 (1898)	White	none	none	C.C.W.D. Tex.	affirmed

== See also ==
- Certificate of division
