= Van Dusen v. Barrack =

- Supreme Court of the United States

Argued January 8–9, 1964 Decided March 30, 1964
- Full case name: Van Dusen, U.S. District Judge, et al. v. Barrack, Administratrix, et al.
- Citations: 376 U.S. 612 (more) 84 S. Ct. 805; 11 L. Ed. 2d 945; 1964 U.S. LEXIS 1537

Court membership
- Chief Justice Earl Warren Associate Justices Hugo Black · William O. Douglas; Tom C. Clark · John M. Harlan II; William J. Brennan Jr. · Potter Stewart; Byron White · Arthur Goldberg

Case opinions
- Majority: Goldberg, joined by Warren, Douglas, Clark, Harlan, Brennan, Stewart, White
- Concurrence: Black

Van Dusen v. Barrack, 376 U.S. 612 (1964), was a United States Supreme Court case in which the Court held that when a case is transferred from a federal court in one state to a federal court in another, the choice of law should be that of the state in which the case was originally filed.
