= John Wiley & Sons, Inc. v. Livingston =

- Supreme Court of the United States

Decided March 30, 1964
- Full case name: John Wiley & Sons, Inc. v. Livingston
- Citations: 376 U.S. 543 (more)

Holding
- Rights of employees under a collective bargaining agreement are not automatically lost by the disappearance by merger of the employer, and, in appropriate circumstances, the successor employer may be required to arbitrate under the contract. Particularly, the courts determine whether arbitration is required, based on the agreement and federal law.

Court membership
- Chief Justice Earl Warren Associate Justices Hugo Black · William O. Douglas; Tom C. Clark · John M. Harlan II; William J. Brennan Jr. · Potter Stewart; Byron White · Arthur Goldberg

Case opinion
- Majority: Harlan, joined by unanimous
- Goldberg took no part in the consideration or decision of the case.

Laws applied
- Labor Management Relations Act

John Wiley & Sons, Inc. v. Livingston, 376 U.S. 543 (1964), was a United States Supreme Court case in which the court held that rights of employees under a collective bargaining agreement are not automatically lost by the disappearance by merger of the employer, and, in appropriate circumstances, the successor employer may be required to arbitrate under the contract. Particularly, the courts determine whether arbitration is required, based on the agreement and federal law.

== Background ==
Respondent labor union brought an action against publisher John Wiley & Sons under Section 301 of the Labor Management Relations Act to compel arbitration under a collective bargaining agreement executed by a company which the petitioner acquired by merger. The federal district court denied relief, but the Court of Appeals reversed and directed arbitration.

== Opinion of the court ==
The court issued an opinion on March 30, 1964. Among other things, the Supreme Court said that courts need to balance the new management's prerogative to shuffle the business around with the employee's need to be protected from unfairness. The disposition of the case was an order that Wiley enter arbitration even though it never consented to an arbitration agreement itself.
