= Holman v Johnson =

1775 English contract law case

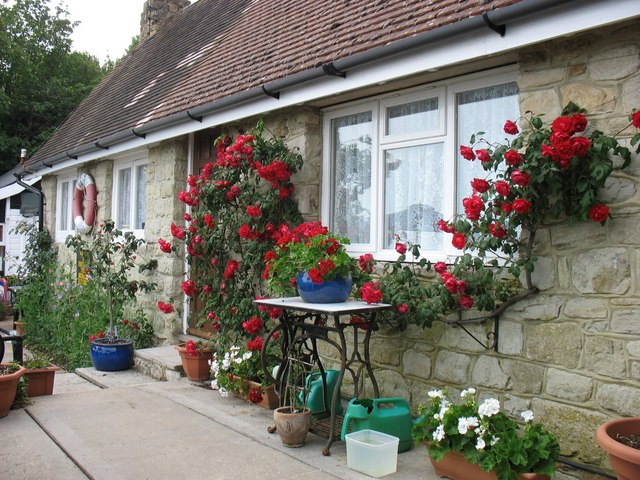
- Smugglers Tea Rooms
- Court: Court of King's Bench
- Decided: 5 July 1775
- Citations: (1775) 1 Cowp 341; 98 ER 1120
- Transcript: CommonLII

Court membership
- Judge sitting: Lord Mansfield CJ

Keywords
- contracts; illegality; choice of law

Holman v Johnson (1775) 1 Cowp 341 is an English contract law case concerning the principles behind illegal transactions.

It is possibly the first case in English law where the court explicitly recognised that aspects of a claim before the court might be adjudicated according to foreign law.

It is also the first English case to explicitly mention and define the term ‘public policy.’

== Facts ==
The claimant, who lived in Dunkirk, sold tea to the defendant. The claimant knew it was intended to be smuggled into England, though was not concerned with the smuggling scheme. The method of payment was meant to be by bills of exchange drawn in England. The claimant brought an action for non-payment, and the defendant contended that it could not be enforced because the contract was unlawful.

== Judgment ==
Lord Mansfield CJ held that the agreement could be enforced because the seller had himself done nothing unlawful. He said the following.

The objection, that a contract is immoral or illegal as between plaintiff and defendant, sounds at all times very ill in the mouth of the defendant. It is not for his sake, however, that the objection is ever allowed; but it is founded in general principles of policy, which the defendant has the advantage of, contrary to the real justice, as between him and the plaintiff, by accident, if I may say so. The principle of public policy is this; ex dolo malo non oritur actio. No court will lend its aid to a man who founds his cause of action upon an immoral or an illegal act. If, from the plaintiff's own standing or otherwise, the cause of action appears to arise ex turpi causa, or the transgression of a positive law of this country, there the court says he has no right to be assisted. It is upon that ground the court goes; not for the sake of the defendant, but because they will not lend their aid to such a plaintiff. So if the plaintiff and defendant were to change sides, and the defendant was to bring his action against the plaintiff, the latter would then have the advantage of it; for where both were equally in fault, potior est conditio defendentis.

The question therefore is, whether, in this case, the plaintiff's demand is founded upon the ground of any immoral act or contract, or upon the ground of his being guilty of any thing which is prohibited by a positive law of this country. — An immoral contract it certainly is not; for the revenue laws themselves, as well as the offences against them, are all positivi juris. What then is the contract of the plaintiff? It is this: being a resident and inhabitant of Dunkirk, together with his partner, who was born there, he sells a quantity of tea to the defendant, and delivers it at Dunkirk to the defendant's order, to be paid for in ready money there, or by bills drawn personally upon him in England. This is an action brought merely for goods sold and delivered at Dunkirk. Where then, or in what respect is the plaintiff guilty of any crime? Is there any law of England transgressed by a person making a complete sale of a parcel of goods at Dunkirk, and giving credit for them? The contract is complete, and nothing is left to be done. The seller, indeed, knows what the buyer is going to do with the goods, but has no concern in the transaction itself. It is not a bargain to be paid in case the vendee should succeed in landing the goods; but the interest of the vendor is totally at an end, and his contract complete by the delivery of the goods at Dunkirk.

To what a dangerous extent would this go if it were to be held a crime. If contraband clothes are bought in France, and brought home hither; or if glass bought abroad, which ought to pay a great duty, is run into England; shall the French taylor or the glass-manufacturer stand to the risk or loss attending their being run into England? Clearly not. Debt follows the person, and may be recovered in England, let the contract of debt be made where it will; and the law allows a fiction for the sake of expediting the remedy. Therefore, I am clearly of opinion, that the vendors of these goods are not guilty of any offence, nor have they transgressed against the provisions of any Act of Parliament.

I am very glad the old books have been looked into. The doctrine Huberus lays down, is founded in good sense, and upon general principles of justice. I entirely agree with him. He puts the general case in question, thus: tit. De Conflictu Legum, vol 2, pag. 539. “In certo loco merces quædam prohibitæ sunt. Si vendantur ibi, contractus est nullus. Verum, si merx eadem alibi sit vendita, ubi non erat interdicta, emptor condemnabitur, quia, contractus inde ab initio validus fuit.” Translated, it might be rendered thus: In England, tea, which has not paid duty, is prohibited; and if sold there the contract is null and void. But if sold and delivered at a place where it is not prohibited, as at Dunkirk, and an action is brought for the price of it in England, the buyer shall be condemned to pay the price; because the original contract was good and valid.—He goes on thus: “Verum si merces venditæ in altero loco, ubi prohibitæ sunt essent tradendæ, jam non fieret condemnatio, quia repugnaret hoc juri et commodo reipublicæ quæ merces prohibuit.” Apply this in the same manner.—But if the goods sold were to be delivered in England, where they are prohibited; the contract [345] is void, and the buyer shall not be liable in an action for the price, because it would be an inconvenience and prejudice to the State if such an action could be maintained.

The gist of the whole turns upon this; that the conclusive delivery was at Dunkirk. If the defendant had bespoke the tea at Dunkirk to be sent to England at a certain price; and the plaintiff had undertaken to send it into England, or had had any concern in the running it into England, he would have been an offender against the laws of this country. But upon the facts of the case, from the first to the last, he clearly has offended against no law of England. Therefore, let the rule for a new trial be discharged.

In relation to the conflict of laws point, Mansfield added:

Every action here must be tried by the law of England, but the law of England says that in a variety of circumstances, with regards to contracts legally made abroad, the laws of the country where the cause of action arose shall govern.

== Significance ==
The decision was cited with approval by the House of Lords in Government of India v Taylor [1955] AC 491.

== See also ==
- English contract law
