= Nevsun Resources =

Former Canadian mining company

- Type: Public company
- Traded as: TSX: NSU
- Industry: Metals and mining products
- Headquarters: Vancouver, British Columbia, Canada, Canada
- Key people: Ian Pearce, Chairman; Peter Kukielski, CEO; Ryan MacWilliam, CFO
- Products: Copper; gold; zinc
- Website: zijinmining.com

Nevsun Resources Ltd was a Canadian diversified mid-tier miner with a portfolio of base metal assets. The company was acquired by Zijin Mining Group Company Limited on December 29, 2018. Its three principal assets are its ownership interest in the Timok Project, a high-grade copper-gold development project in Serbia; its Bisha zinc-copper mine in Eritrea; and its balance sheet. The company also holds a number of additional exploration licences and permits in Serbia, Macedonia, and in the Bisha mining district.

== Operations ==
The Timok Project became part of Nevsun Resources Ltd. through the acquisition of Reservoir Minerals Inc. on June 23, 2016. It is a joint venture between Nevsun and Freeport-McMoRan Exploration Corporation.

The Bisha Mine, located in Eritrea, is a volcanogenic massive sulfide ore deposit that commenced production in February 2011. It extracts gold, copper, and zinc.

In November 2014, three former employees of the Bisha Mine filed a civil suit in British Columbia against Nevsun Resources, alleging complicity in human rights abuses, including torture and forced labor. Nevsun's CEO at the time, Cliff Davis, responded by asserting that the allegations were unfounded and that the Bisha Mine adhered to international standards of governance and workplace conditions. In 2016, the Supreme Court of British Columbia ruled that the case could proceed in Canadian courts, a decision upheld by the British Columbia Court of Appeal in 2017. In February 2020, the Supreme Court of Canada confirmed that the case against Nevsun could proceed in Canadian courts.

== Human rights violations ==
In November 2014, three former employees of the Bisha Mine filed a civil suit in British Columbia against Nevsun Resources for complicity in torture, forced labour, slavery, and crimes against humanity.

Company CEO Cliff Davis responded, saying: "We are confident that the allegations are unfounded. Based on various company-led and third party audits, the Bisha Mine has adhered at all times to international standards of governance, workplace conditions, and health and safety. We are committed to ensuring that the Bisha Mine is managed in a safe and responsible manner that respects the interests of local communities, workers, national governance, stakeholders, and the natural environment." Nevsun has previously received criticism from Human Rights Watch for failing to exercise proper human rights due diligence when engaging with a country where forced labour is allegedly practiced.

A Human Rights Watch report released in January 2013 found that Nevsun Resources failed to take the risks of forced labour seriously and then struggled to address allegations of abuse connected to the Bisha Mine in Eritrea. Eritrea's government maintains a “national service” program that conscripts Eritreans into prolonged and indefinite terms of forced labor, generally under abusive conditions. It is through this forced labor program that mining companies run the most direct risk of involvement in the Eritrean government's human rights violations.

In 2016, the Supreme Court of British Columbia ruled that the case against Nevsun can proceed in the Canadian courts. The decision was upheld on appeal to the British Columbia Court of Appeal in November 2017. On January 26, 2018, Nevsun sought leave to appeal to the Supreme Court of Canada. In February 2020, the Supreme Court upheld the decision from the British Columbia Court of Appeal in Nevsun Resources Ltd v Araya, stating that the case against Nevsun can proceed in Canadian courts.

== See also ==
- Land restoration
- Mine closure planning
