= List of United States Supreme Court cases, volume 376 =

This is a list of all the United States Supreme Court cases from volume 376 of the United States Reports:

Case name	Citation	Date decided
Wesberry v. Sanders	376 U.S. 1	1964
Wright v. Rockefeller	376 U.S. 52	1964
United States v. Healy	376 U.S. 75	1964
United States v. Wiesenfeld Warehouse Co.	376 U.S. 86	1964
S.R. Co. v. North Carolina	376 U.S. 93	1964
Costello v. INS	376 U.S. 120	1964
Greene v. United States	376 U.S. 149	1964
Tilton v. Missouri P.R.R. Co.	376 U.S. 169	1964
Metromedia, Inc. v. City of Pasadena	376 U.S. 186	1964
Arlan's Department Store v. Kentucky	376 U.S. 186	1964
Brooks v. Florida	376 U.S. 187	1964
Persinger v. Washington	376 U.S. 187	1964
Rogers v. United States	376 U.S. 188	1964
Kotek v. Bennett	376 U.S. 188	1964
City of New Orleans v. Barthe	376 U.S. 189	1964
NAACP v. Webb's City, Inc.	376 U.S. 190	1964
Cox v. Kansas	376 U.S. 191	1964
United States v. Merz	376 U.S. 192	1964
Diamond v. Louisiana	376 U.S. 201	1964
Neill v. Cook	376 U.S. 202	1964
Doughty v. Maxwell	376 U.S. 202	1964
Wolfsohn v. Hankin	376 U.S. 203	1964
FPC v. Southern California Edison Co.	376 U.S. 205	1964
Kreznar v. United States	376 U.S. 221	1964
Lord v. Winchester Star	376 U.S. 221	1964
Honeywood v. Rockefeller	376 U.S. 222	1964
Martin v. Bush	376 U.S. 222	1964
Seattle v. Beezer	376 U.S. 224	1964
Sears, Roebuck & Co. v. Stiffel Co.	376 U.S. 225	1964
Compco Corp. v. Day-Brite Lighting, Inc.	376 U.S. 234	1964
Platt v. 3M	376 U.S. 240	1964
Packinghouse Workers v. Needham Packing Co.	376 U.S. 247	1964
New York Times Co. v. Sullivan	376 U.S. 254	1964
Yiatchos v. Yiatchos	376 U.S. 306	1964
Italia Societa per Azioni v. Oregon Stevedoring Co.	376 U.S. 315	1964
United States v. Ward Baking Co.	376 U.S. 327	1964
Arceneaux v. Louisiana	376 U.S. 336	1964
Shuttlesworth v. Birmingham	376 U.S. 339	1964
Arizona v. California	376 U.S. 340	1964
Smith v. Pennsylvania	376 U.S. 354	1964
Michaels Enterprises, Inc. v. United States	376 U.S. 356	1964
Bruning v. United States	376 U.S. 358	1964
Preston v. United States	376 U.S. 364	1964
Humble Pipe Line Co. v. Waggonner	376 U.S. 369	1964
A.L. Mechling Barge Lines, Inc. v. United States	376 U.S. 375	1964
United States v. J.B. Montgomery, Inc.	376 U.S. 389	1964
Banco Nacional v. Sabbatino	376 U.S. 398	1964
Boire v. Greyhound Corp.	376 U.S. 473	1964
Stoner v. California	376 U.S. 483	1964
Steelworkers v. NLRB	376 U.S. 492	1964
Jackson v. United States	376 U.S. 503	1964
Kirk v. Boehm	376 U.S. 512	1964
Cepero v. Johnson	376 U.S. 512	1964
Fawcett Publishing, Inc. v. Morris	376 U.S. 513	1964
Auclair Transportation, Inc. v. United States	376 U.S. 514	1964
FPC v. Hunt	376 U.S. 515	1964
Rugendorf v. United States	376 U.S. 528	1964
John Wiley & Sons, Inc. v. Livingston	376 U.S. 543	1964
Mrvica v. Esperdy	376 U.S. 560	1964
Ungar v. Sarafite	376 U.S. 575	1964
Rabinowitz v. Kennedy	376 U.S. 605	1964
Van Dusen v. Barrack	376 U.S. 612	1964
In re Crow	376 U.S. 647	1964
Port of Brookings v. United States	376 U.S. 647	1964
Suburban Telephone Co. v. Mountain States Tel. & Tel. Co.	376 U.S. 648	1964
Carter v. Florida	376 U.S. 648	1964
Sells v. Welsh	376 U.S. 649	1964
O'Bryan v. Oklahoma ex rel. Oklahoma Bar Association	376 U.S. 649	1964
Hamilton v. Alabama (1964)	376 U.S. 650	1964
United States v. El Paso Natural Gas Co.	376 U.S. 651	1964
United States v. First Nat'l Bank & Tr. Co.	376 U.S. 665	1964
United States v. Barnett	376 U.S. 681	1964
Arnold v. North Carolina	376 U.S. 773	1964
Publishers' Ass'n v. Mailers	376 U.S. 775	1964
Henry v. Rock Hill	376 U.S. 776	1964
Pan-Am. Life Ins. Co. v. Rodriguez	376 U.S. 779	1964
J.B. Acton, Inc. v. United States	376 U.S. 779	1964
Standard Cigar Co. v. Tabacalera Severiano Jorge, S. A.	376 U.S. 780	1964
Aetna Insurance Co. v. Menendez	376 U.S. 781	1964
Tel. News System, Inc. v. Illinois Bell Telephone Co.	376 U.S. 782	1964
Yribarne v. San Bernardino County	376 U.S. 783	1964
United Fuel Gas Co. v. Public Service Commission	376 U.S. 784	1964
