= Stoner v. California =

- Supreme Court of the United States

Argued February 25, 1964 Decided March 23, 1964
- Full case name: Joseph Lyle Stoner v. State of California
- Docket no.: 63-209
- Citations: 376 U.S. 483 (more) 84 S. Ct. 889; 11 L. Ed. 2d 856
- Argument: Oral argument
- Opinion announcement: Opinion announcement

Case history
- Prior: Conviction affirmed 205 Cal.App.2d 108, 22 Cal.Rptr. 718 (Cal.App., 2d. A.D., 1962); certification denied, 205 Cal.App.2d 116 (Cal., 1962); certiorari granted, 374 U.S. 826

Holding
- Warrantless search incident to arrest must be contemporaneous with and in general vicinity of arrest to be reasonable; consent from hotel personnel, even in management, is insufficient to permit search of guest room without warrant.

Court membership
- Chief Justice Earl Warren Associate Justices Hugo Black · William O. Douglas; Tom C. Clark · John M. Harlan II; William J. Brennan Jr. · Potter Stewart; Byron White · Arthur Goldberg

Case opinions
- Majority: Stewart, joined by Warren, Black, Douglas, Clark, Brennan, White, Goldberg
- Concur/dissent: Harlan

Laws applied
- U.S. Const. amend. IV

Stoner v. California, 376 U.S. 483 (1964), is a United States Supreme Court decision involving the Fourth Amendment. It was a criminal case appealed from the California Courts of Appeal after the California Supreme Court denied review. The case extended the situations under which search warrants are required as they reversed a robbery conviction made on the basis of evidence obtained in violation of the holding.

The petitioner, Joey Stoner, had been arrested following a 1960 supermarket robbery in the Los Angeles area. Eyewitness accounts and evidence left at the scene led the police to a hotel elsewhere in the region where Stoner was staying. Two days later, detectives went to the hotel and, with the desk clerk's permission, searched the room and found further evidence linking him to the robbery. Stoner was arrested two days later in Nevada, and extradited. The evidence from the hotel room was used to convict him of the robbery at trial. Stoner unsuccessfully challenged the admissibility of the evidence at trial and on appeal, since police had lacked a warrant and relied on the clerk's permission. The appeals court held that the search was incident to arrest and thus permissible.

Writing for the Court, Justice Potter Stewart reaffirmed two previous holdings: The first, Agnello v. United States (1925) held such warrantless searches are constitutional only to the extent that they take place at the same time, and in the same place, as the arrest. Two other cases established that the hotel clerk's consent did not permit police to search the room without a warrant. "[A] guest in a hotel room is entitled to constitutional protection against unreasonable searches and seizures" Stewart wrote. "That protection would disappear if it were left to depend upon the unfettered discretion of an employee of the hotel." It did not matter that hotel staff might be permitted to enter the room as that was merely for the limited purpose of cleaning and maintenance. The only other opinion was Justice John Marshall Harlan II, who concurred in the holding but dissented from the disposition reversing the conviction. He would have left it to California's courts to decide whether the admission of the hotel-room evidence was harmless error, as the Court had done in similar circumstances in Fahy v. Connecticut.

The reaffirmation of the earlier rulings was necessitated by the Mapp v. Ohio decision a few years earlier, which extended the exclusionary rule under which unlawfully obtained evidence is inadmissible at trial, to the states as well as the federal government. It came at a time when the Warren Court was beginning to rethink and provide exceptions to the traditional Fourth Amendment doctrine that only those with a possessory or proprietary interest in what was searched had standing to challenge the constitutionality of the search. Several years later, in Katz v. United States, the Court abandoned that doctrine entirely in favor of the reasonable expectation of privacy test now in use.

== Underlying prosecution ==
On the night of October 25, 1960, two men robbed the Budget Town Food Market in Monrovia, California. One suspect was described by eyewitnesses as carrying a gun, wearing horn-rimmed glasses and a gray jacket. A checkbook, possibly belonging to one of the robbers, was found in a nearby parking lot. It was traced to a Joey Stoner, and two stubs indicated checks drawn to a hotel in nearby Pomona.

The Monrovia officers who investigated contacted the Pomona police. They learned that Stoner had a criminal record, and obtained a photograph of him. The eyewitnesses identified him as the man they saw. Two nights after the robbery, the officers went to the hotel in Pomona.

At the hotel, they asked for Stoner. The desk clerk confirmed he was a guest but added that he was presently out. They asked if they could enter the room since they were investigating an armed robbery. The clerk let them in to Stoner's room, where they found the jacket, glasses and gun from the night of the robbery.

Stoner was arrested in Las Vegas two days later along with his partner in the robbery. He waived extradition to California, where he was indicted, tried and convicted. Since he had two prior convictions he was found to be a habitual criminal and sentenced to a long prison term.

On appeal to the Second District, he argued that the search of his hotel room was unconstitutional since the police did not have a search warrant. In the two days between the robbery and the search, Stoner claimed, there was enough time for the police to get one. The court responded that most of that time was spent establishing his identity and whereabouts as a suspect. He also argued that the search of his hotel room could not have incident to his arrest due to the time between it and his arrest, and the fact that the latter took place in another state. The officers were also aware he was not present, he added, so they could not have been intending to arrest him when they entered his hotel room. The court cited many holdings in California case law to the extent that it did not matter whether the arrest took place before or after the search.

Stoner further claimed his confession had effectively been coerced. He claimed that he had not been arraigned until two days after his arrest, was moved from one jail to another during that period and not allowed to speak with his wife. The court found that the record reflected that much of that two-day period was involved in transporting him back to the Los Angeles area from Las Vegas, and allowing him to speak with his parole officer per his request, who had advised him to cooperate with the police. Nor had he been prevented from calling his wife, just discouraged from doing so.

== Decision ==
The Court heard oral arguments in February 1964. It appointed an attorney, William Dempsey, to argue for Stoner. Arlo Smith, future San Francisco district attorney then an assistant attorney general in Stanley Mosk's office, argued for the state. The American Civil Liberties Union of Southern California filed an amicus curiae brief on Stoner's behalf. A month later the decision was handed down.

The justices had unanimously voted to reverse the appeals court, and thus the conviction. "[I]t is clear that the search of the petitioner's hotel room in Pomona, California, on October 27 was not incident to his arrest in Las Vegas, Nevada, on October 29," wrote Justice Potter Stewart. "The search was completely unrelated to the arrest, both as to time and as to place." Under the Court's holding in Agnello v. United States four decades earlier, a search incident to arrest had to be "only if it is substantially contemporaneous with the arrest, and is confined to the immediate vicinity of the arrest" to be constitutional.

Stewart noted that even the state had declined to argue that the search was incident to the arrest, since the cases cited by the appellate court could not be taken to authorize a search so distant from the arrest. Instead, it had claimed the hotel clerk's consent was sufficient for the search. But even that, he said, was not enough. Four years earlier, he recalled, in Jones v. United States, the Court had held that "anyone legitimately on the premises" had standing to challenge the search of the property.

"Our decisions make clear that the rights protected by the Fourth Amendment are not to be eroded by strained applications of the law of agency or by unrealistic doctrines of 'apparent authority,'" Stewart wrote. "[I]t was the petitioner's constitutional right which was at stake here, and not the night clerk's nor the hotel's. It was a right, therefore, which only the petitioner could waive by word or deed, either directly or through an agent." The Court had previously held it unlawful for a hotel manager or an assistant to permit a search. (Note: In Lustig v. United States, 338 U.S. 74 (1949), and United States v. Jeffers, 342 U.S. 48 (1951), respectively.)

Stewart allowed that it was true that hotel guest could not completely isolate themselves from intrusion. It was implicit in a hotel stay that management, cleaning staff and maintenance could enter the room without a guest's permission in order to fulfill their job duties. But that privilege was limited to that purpose, and "the conduct of the night clerk and the police in the police in the present case was of an entirely different order." He did not see the case as being substantially different from Chapman v. United States, another recent Fourth Amendment case in which the Court had held that landlords' permission did not allow police to search rented premises. Similarly, McDonald v. United States had extended constitutional protection to tenants in boardinghouses.

Going back to Johnson v. United States, a 1948 case that had suppressed drug evidence obtained by police who were let in to a hotel room by the occupant after knocking on the door, the Court had held that "a guest in a hotel room is entitled to constitutional protection against unreasonable searches and seizures," Stewart wrote. "That protection would disappear if it were left to depend upon the unfettered discretion of an employee of the hotel.".

Justice John Marshall Harlan II concurred in the holding but dissented from the disposition. He felt the Court should have merely vacated and let the California courts decide whether admission of the hotel room materials constituted harmless error. (Note: I.e., that enough other lawfully obtained incriminating evidence (the check stubs and the eyewitness identifications) existed that a reasonable jury would have likely convicted Stoner based on that evidence alone.) In Fahy v. Connecticut, another case from the previous term where the Court had suppressed illegally obtained evidence and reversed a conviction, the state courts had at least already made that finding, Harlan observed.

== See also ==
- List of United States Supreme Court cases, volume 376
- List of United States Supreme Court cases by the Warren Court
