= Motion to strike (United States Congress) =

A motion to strike is an amendment which seeks to delete language from a bill proposed in either the House of Representatives or Senate of the United States Congress, or to delete language from an earlier amendment.

It is one of three types of amendments; the other two are motion to insert, and motion to strike and insert.

A motion to strike the last word is a pro forma amendment under the "five minute rule", formally proposing to remove the last word from the text under consideration, but in practical terms simply seeking an additional five minutes to speak.
