= Maryland v. Pringle =

- Supreme Court of the United States

Argued November 3, 2003 Decided December 15, 2003
- Full case name: State of Maryland v. Joseph Jermaine Pringle
- Docket no.: 02-809
- Citations: 540 U.S. 366 (more) 124 S. Ct. 795; 157 L. Ed. 2d 769; 2003 U.S. LEXIS 9198; 72 U.S.L.W. 4103; 2003 Cal. Daily Op. Service 10763; 17 Fla. L. Weekly Fed. S 83
- Argument: Oral argument

Case history
- Procedural: Writ of Certiorari to the Court of Appeals of Maryland

Holding
- The arrest of Joseph Pringle did not violate the Fourth Amendment because the officer had probable cause to arrest him.

Court membership
- Chief Justice William Rehnquist Associate Justices John P. Stevens · Sandra Day O'Connor; Antonin Scalia · Anthony Kennedy; David Souter · Clarence Thomas; Ruth Bader Ginsburg · Stephen Breyer

Case opinion
- Majority: Rehnquist, joined by unanimous

Laws applied
- U.S. Const. amend. IV

Maryland v. Pringle, 540 U.S. 366 (2003), was a decision by the Supreme Court of the United States in which the Court unanimously upheld the arrest of three passengers in an automobile where drugs were found. The case regards the reasonableness of the arrest of a passenger in an automobile.

== Background ==
Near 3 a.m. on August 7, 1999, a police officer in Baltimore County, Maryland pulled over a car for speeding and for the driver's failure to wear a seatbelt. The car was being driven by Donte Partlow, the vehicle's owner, and had two passengers: Joseph Pringle in the front seat, and Otis Smith in the backseat. The officer asked to see Partlow's license and registration, where the officer spotted a large sum of money in the glove compartment. As the officer gave Partlow a verbal warning, a second officer arrived on the scene. The second officer asked if there were any weapons or narcotics in the car, which Partlow denied, giving the officers permission to search the vehicle. Upon searching, the officers found cocaine behind the backseat armrest, as well as $763 in cash in the glove compartment. The officers asked who the cocaine belonged to, and all three denied owning it. All three suspects were then arrested.

At the police station, Pringle waived his Miranda rights and admitted that the drugs were his. Partlow and Smith were subsequently released without charge. Pringle was convicted of possession with intent to distribute cocaine and possession of cocaine, and was sentenced to 10 years incarceration without the possibility of parole. The Maryland Court of Special Appeals affirmed, but the Maryland Court of Appeals reversed, holding that, absent specific facts tending to show Pringle's knowledge and dominion or control over the drugs, the mere finding of cocaine in the back armrest when Pringle was a front-seat passenger in a car being driven by its owner was insufficient to establish probable cause for an arrest for possession of drugs.

== Opinion of the Court ==
Chief Justice Rehnquist delivered the opinion for a unanimous Court.

Because the officer had probable cause to arrest Pringle, the arrest did not contravene the Fourth and Fourteenth Amendments to the United States Constitution. Maryland law authorizes police officers to execute warrantless arrests where the officer has probable cause to believe that a felony has been committed or is being committed in the officer's presence. Here, it is uncontested that the officer, upon recovering the suspected cocaine, had probable cause to believe a felony had been committed; the question is whether he had probable cause to believe Pringle committed that crime.

The "substance of all the definitions of probable cause is a reasonable ground for belief of guilt," Brinegar v. United States, 338 U. S. 160, 175, and that belief must be particularized with respect to the person to be searched or seized, Ybarra v. Illinois, 444 U. S. 85, 91. To determine whether an officer had probable cause to make an arrest, a court must examine the events leading up to the arrest, and then decide "whether these historical facts, viewed from the standpoint of an objectively reasonable police officer, amount to" probable cause. Ornelas v. United States, 517 U. S. 690, 696.

As it is an entirely reasonable inference from the facts here that any or all of the car's occupants had knowledge of, and exercised dominion and control over, the cocaine, a reasonable officer could conclude that there was probable cause to believe Pringle committed the crime of possession of cocaine, either solely or jointly. Reversed and remanded.

== See also ==
- List of United States Supreme Court cases, volume 540
- List of United States Supreme Court cases
