= ICE detention expansion plan =

In 2026, the United States government is pursuing a major expansion of its immigration detention facilities, known internally as the Detention Reengineering Initiative. The plan is funded by the One Big Beautiful Bill Act and would enable the continuing expansion of detention and removal activities carried out by United States Immigration and Customs Enforcement under the second Trump administration. It is intended to reach a goal of detaining 100,000 immigrants at a time. An ICE document estimated the total cost of the expansion at $38.3 billion.

The plan calls for three types of facilities:

- 8 Large-Scale Detention Facilities, capable of housing 7,000 to 10,000 prisoners each, for up to 60 days.
- 16 Regional Processing Centers, which will serve as routing and transportation nodes, housing 1,000 to 1,500 prisoners each for three to seven days at a time.
- 10 "turnkey" facilities, where ERO already operates, would also be acquired.

To accomplish the plan, ICE has moved to purchase around 20 warehouses for conversion into detention facilities. Many of these sites have seen intense public opposition to the purchase, licensing, or opening of new detention facilities.

On March 31, 2026, ICE paused further purchases of warehouses following the appointment of Markwayne Mullin as Homeland Security Secretary.

In April 2026, Representative Rashida Tlaib introduced the Ban Warehouse Detention Act, which would prohibit conversions of warehouses and other non-traditional sites into ICE detention centers.

== Proposed warehouse purchases ==
Proposed ICE warehouse locations. Purchased in green; Purchased but paused in yellow; Cancelled or Withdrawn in red; Proposed in blue.

Location	Estimated beds	Size (sq. ft.)	Status	Local political response	Notes
Oakwood, Georgia (address in Flowery Branch)	1,500	540,408	Purchased	Opposed by city council, Senator Raphael Warnock.	Facility purchased by DHS.
Socorro, Texas	8,500	826,780	Purchased	Socorro officials have raised concerns about water supply. Opposed by Socorro city council, Socorro mayor, El Paso City Council, county.	Three warehouses purchased totaling 826,780 square feet.
Roxbury, New Jersey	1,500	470,044	Purchased.	Township council opposes. Opposed by state and city lawsuit.	Moving forward amidst lawsuit.
Romulus, Michigan	500	250,000	Purchased	City Council resolution opposes. Opposed by lawsuit filed by city and state. Protested April 25.	
Surprise, Arizona	1,500	418,000	Purchased, but paused.		Contracted to Gardaworld Federal Services of Arlington, Virginia. Town mayor reports that current plans cap facility at 542 occupied beds. Lawsuit filed by the state of Arizona to stop the project for lack of environmental review. Work stopped by Federal government on April 22/23.
Social Circle, Georgia	8,500	over 1,000,000	Purchased, but paused.	CIty manager states infrastructure is inadequate for use in detention. Water access for facility blocked by city in March 2026.	
Tremont, Pennsylvania	7,500		Purchased, but paused.	Opposed by state government. Water and sewage service denied.	ICE is currently appealing State Department of Environmental Protection limits on water and sewage use.
San Antonio, Texas	1,500		Purchased, but paused.	Opposed by mayor. City Council resolution puts limits on future facilities, but won't directly affect the purchased one.	Paused for environmental review following lawsuits elsewhere in the country.
Hagerstown, Maryland	1,500	825,000	Purchased, but paused.	County commission issued resolution of "unwavering support for ICE" despite protests.	Contracted work on the facility is paused due to lawsuit by Maryland's Attorney General.
Hamburg, Pennsylvania (Upper Bern Township)	1,500	518,140	Purchased, but paused.	Opposed by Lehigh County Executive. Opposed by sate government. Water and sewage service denied.	ICE is currently appealing State Department of Environmental Protection limits on water and sewage use.
Van Buren Township, Michigan			Proposed	Six-month moratorium on detention center permitting passed on February 17.	Warehouse purchase by group linked to Romulus, Michigan, site led to local legislation.
Indianapolis	8,500		Proposed	Opposed by city officials.	
Salt Lake City	7,500	833,280	Purchased but paused	Mayor expressed deep concern with safety and water issues.	Facility will be designated as excess property.
Concord, North Carolina	1,500		Proposed		
Orlando, Florida	1,500	439,945	Proposed	Opposed by county commission.	Contractors conducted exploratory tour of 439,945-s.f. facility. No notice provided to the city as of April 2026.
Harlingen, Texas	500		Proposed		
Port Allen, Louisiana	500		Proposed		
Merrillville, Ind.		275,000	Proposed	Town resolution opposes.	Property owner Opus Holding LLC stated in February 2026 that it isn't negotiating with DHS.
Merrimack, New Hampshire	500		Cancelled		Cancellation announced by Governor Kelly Ayotte.
Lebanon, Tennessee	10,000 - 15,000		Cancelled	County commissioners opposed. State representative states infrastructure is inadequate for use in detention. Local residents oppose.	Sen. Marsha Blackburn and Wilson County Mayor Randall Hutto reported that DHS will not move forward with the facility.
Byhalia, Mississippi			Cancelled	Opposed by local officials.	Senator Roger Wicker announced that ICE was looking for a new site after local opposition.
Chester, New York	1,500		Cancelled		Purchase mistakenly announced and no longer under consideration.
Ashland, Virginia		1,000,000	Withdrawn by owner	Opposed by County Board of Supervisors	Jim Pattison Developments refused sale after public pressure.
Kansas City, Missouri	7,500		Withdrawn by owner	City has banned non-municipal detention facilities.	Platform Ventures refused sale after public pressure.
Oklahoma City, Oklahoma			Withdrawn by owner		Withdrawal announced by mayor.
Hutchins, Texas	9,500	1,000,000	Withdrawn by owner	City leaders opposed.	Property owner refused sale under community pressure.
Woodbury, Minnesota			Withdrawn by owner		
Shakopee, Minnesota			Withdrawn by owner		
Sources: Locations, size, and status as of February 18, 2026. Other information as cited in the table.
