= Motion to strike (court of law) =

Request to remove improper material from a pleading

A motion to strike is a request by one party in a United States trial requesting that the presiding judge order the removal of all or part of the opposing party's pleading to the court. These motions are most commonly sought by the defendant, as to a matter contained in the plaintiff's complaint; however, they may also be asserted by plaintiffs to a defendant's answer or other pleadings such as cross-complaints. The Federal Rules of Civil Procedure states that "The court may strike from a pleading an insufficient defense or any redundant, immaterial, impertinent, or scandalous matter." Similarly, for example, the California Code of Civil Procedure provides that a motion to strike may be made to strike out any "irrelevant, false, or improper matter inserted in any pleading." A motion to strike may also be used to request the elimination of all or a portion of a trial witness's testimony. During a jury trial, if a motion to strike witness testimony is granted, the jury is typically instructed to disregard the stricken statements.
