= Enough Is Enough =

Enough Is Enough may refer to:

== Music ==
=== Albums ===
- Enough Is Enough (Big Lean album), 2015
- Enough Is Enough (Billy Squier album), 1986

=== Songs ===
- "Enough Is Enough" (April Wine song), 1982
- "Enough Is Enough" (Chumbawamba song), 1993
- "Enough Is Enough" (Post Malone song), 2023
- "Read My Lips (Enough Is Enough)", a 1989 song by Jimmy Somerville
- "No More Tears (Enough Is Enough)", a 1979 duet by Donna Summer and Barbra Streisand
- "Enough Is Enough", a 1981 song by Status Quo from the album Never Too Late
- "Enough Is Enough", a 1981 song by Toronto from the album Head On
- "Enough Is Enough", a 1999 song by Y-Tribe featuring Elisabeth Troy
- "Enough Is Enough (Don't Give Up On Us)", a 2011 song by Avicii released on his SoundCloud

== Organizations ==
- Enough is Enough (campaign), a UK political slogan
- Enough is Enough (Nigeria), a youth advocacy group in Nigeria
- Enough Is Enough (US organization), an anti-pornography organization
- Enough is Enough (party), a political party in Serbia
- ¡Basta Ya! (Spanish for "Enough is Enough"), a Spanish anti-terrorism organization
- ¡Ya basta!, slogan for several Latin American insurgent groups
- Ya Basta Association, network of Italian anti-capitalist and pro-immigrants rights groups
- Zvakwana (Shona for "Enough is Enough"), an underground movement in Zimbabwe
- Sokwanele (Ndebele for "Enough is Enough"), another name for the Zimbabwe movement

== Television ==
- "Enough Is Enough (No More Tears)", a 2005 episode of Grey's Anatomy

== Other ==
- Enough Is Enough (letter), a resignation letter written by Davison L. Budhoo to the IMF

== See also ==
- Enuff Z'Nuff, an American band
- "Enough Is Never Enough", the B-side to Garbage's 2001 "Cherry Lips" single
