= NYC Ya Basta Collective =

Activist group

NYC Ya Basta Collective at an immigrants rights march, March, 2001

The NYC Ya Basta Collective was a group of anti-globalization activists, based primarily in NYC, active from roughly October, 2000 through October, 2001, inspired by the Ya Basta Association.

Initiated in October, 2000 by L Fantoni and TFG Casper on the heels of the anti-IMF / World Bank protests in Prague, a collective soon formed and developed its own variation of the Tute Bianche tactic of the padded bloc. Their tactics relied on civil disobedience, where the protesters acted "silly" as possible, using kazoos, water balloons, and water pistols against the police. The members wore white chemical jumpsuits over improvised padding to protect themselves from rubber bullets and batons. These tactics was meant to highlight the disproportionate responses and power disparity between the police and the protesters. The collective organized several actions and events highlighting the inadequacy of borders, in support of immigrant rights, and against racism and racialist hate groups. David Graeber was a member involved in the early organizing, and detailed its growth in Direct Action: An Ethnography.

In April, 2001, this collective, along with the Direct Action Network, was active in organizing, after invitation, a Canada–United States border crossing over the Seaway International Bridge, in cooperation with the Akwesasne Mohawk Warrior Society, at the St Regis Mohawk reservation, leading up to the anti-FTAA protests in Quebec City, Quebec. An estimated 500 anti-globalists, along with a few Mohawk warriors, challenged the legitimacy of the border. The collective never made it to Quebec. The American and Canadian police identified them as potential "violent elements" and those suspected of involvement where interrogated and detained for days when attempting to cross the border.

The NYC Ya Basta Collective is now defunct.

== See also ==
- Civil and social disobedience
- Disobbedienti
- Ya Basta
