= Luca Casarini =

Italian activist (born 1967)

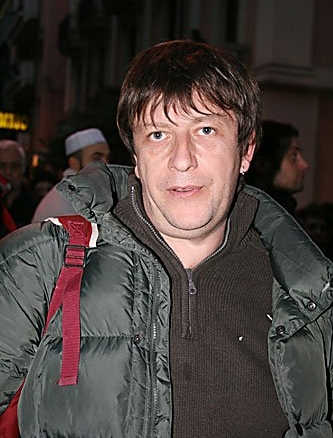
Casarini in 2008

Luca Casarini (born 8 May 1967) is an Italian activist and former proponent of the Tute Bianche movement. Born in Venice, Casarini was influential in the development of the Tute Bianche movement that practiced social and civil disobedience while dressed in white overalls and padding (known as a "padded block").

On 18 March 2008 Casarini's first novel, La parte della Fortuna, was published by Mondadori.

Since some years he is working for the organization Mediterranea Saving Humans

== See also ==
- Civil and social disobedience
- Disobbedienti
- WOMBLES
- Ya Basta
