= Operation Ngatipedzenavo =

Operation Ngatipedzenavo (English: Let Us Finish Them Off), was a large scale Zimbabwean government assassination plot intended to eliminate the MDC leadership and punish those who supposedly voted for the Movement for Democratic Change in the 2008 presidential election rather than for ZANU-PF.

However, the campaign met with harsh condemnation from Zimbabwean opposition parties, church groups, non-governmental organizations, and the wider international community. Also people were beaten thoroughly, forced to sit on hot plate stoves, cut fingers, cut arms and skinned alive that intimidated individuals.

== Perpetrators ==
There has been much documentation of those who have carried out the assaults, beatings and murders on Zimbabwean citizens. These include Modesta Mushambi, Kenneth Dzemba, Cephas Chikomo, Itai Kandemire.

== See also ==
- Operation Dzikisai Madhishi
- Operation Mavhoterapapi
