= G20 protests =

G20 protests may refer to:

- 2009 G20 London summit protests
- 2010 G20 Toronto summit protests
- 2017 G20 Hamburg summit protests
