= Paragon Solutions =

Israeli spyware company

Paragon Solutions Ltd
- Industry: Spyware
- Founded: June 23, 2019; 7 years ago
- Headquarters: Tel Aviv, Israel
- Key people: Idan Nurick (CEO); Ehud Barak (co-founder & board member)
- Products: Graphite
- Subsidiaries: Paragon Solutions US Inc.
- Website: paragonsolutions.io

Paragon Solutions is an Israeli spyware company. Paragon has tried to market itself as more responsible than other spyware vendors as competitors like NSO Group and Cytrox have been involved in scandals.

== History ==
Paragon was founded in 2019 by former commander of Unit 8200 Ehud Schneorson as well as Idan Nurick, Igor Bogudlov, Liad Avraham, and Ehud Barak.

In July 2021, Forbes reported that Battery Ventures had invested between $5 and $10 million in Paragon.

According to the Financial Times, after the discovery of Pegasus on the phones of associates of Jamal Khashoggi, "Paragon declined Israeli government requests to replace Pegasus with Graphite in the Saudi armoury."

In 2023, US president Joe Biden signed Executive Order 14093 which was "seen by experts as targeting NSO, while carving out a space for companies like Paragon to continue selling similar spyware, but only to the closest of US allies." However, the Biden administration subsequently banned the governmental purchase of Paragon software, because of its use for illegal purposes.

In 2024, RED Lattice, a US cybersecurity firm owned by AE Industrial Partners, reportedly acquired Paragon for over half a billion dollars.

In 2025, WhatsApp claimed to have disrupted a campaign by Paragon targeting around ninety users, including journalists and members of civil society.

== Graphite ==
According to Citizen Lab, Graphite is a spyware tool sold by Paragon which allows "access to the instant messaging applications on a device, rather than taking complete control of everything on a phone." Software which Graphite is capable of accessing include WhatsApp, Facebook Messenger, and Signal.

== Customers ==
=== Italy ===
Targets of the Italian government have reportedly included Francesco Cancellato, the editor in chief of Fanpage.it, Luca Casarini, the founder of Mediterranea Saving Humans, Husam El Gomati, who has been a vocal critic of Italy and its dealings in Libya, and Father Mattia Ferrari, an Italian priest who had a close relationship with Pope Francis.

In February 2025, Paragon reportedly cut ties with the Italian government after determining that the Italian government had broken "the terms of service and ethical framework it had agreed under its Paragon contract."

In June 2025, an Italian parliamentary committee confirmed that the Italian government had used Graphite to hack the smartphones of activists advocating for immigrant rights, including Luca Casarini, Giuseppe Caccia, and David Yambio, while denying that Italy had hacked the smartphone of Francesco Cancellato. The Italian intelligence agencies had suspended their use of Graphite on 14 February 2025 pending the committee's inquiry. According to the committee's report, they later decided to terminate the contract with Paragon. Later the same month, Citizen Lab revealed that Ciro Pellegrino, a colleague of Cancellato and the head of the Naples bureau of Fanpage.it, had also been targeted using Graphite, though it was unclear who was behind the targeting.

=== United States ===
Paragon sells to the United States government. The New York Times reported that the Biden administration allowed the Drug Enforcement Administration to use Graphite. Paragon reportedly hired WestExec Advisors in 2019, as well as Holland & Knight in 2023, to advise it on remaining in the US government's good graces.

In March of 2023, President Joe Biden issued Executive Order 14093, banning "operational use by the United States Government of commercial spyware that poses risks to national security or has been misused by foreign actors to enable human rights abuses around the world."

In 2024, a $2 million contract with US Immigration and Customs Enforcement (ICE) was reportedly paused and placed under compliance review, "to review and verify compliance with Executive Order 14093." According to Wired, experts said that "the level of seriousness with which the US government approaches the compliance review of the Paragon contract will influence international trust in the executive order."

Following the January 2025 inauguration of President Donald Trump, the second Trump administration reversed or circumvented the Biden-era ban, and began acquiring phone-hacking spyware (notably Paragon Solutions' Graphite.). In 2025, Trump lifted the pause, allowing ICE to use Paragon's spyware tools.

In September 2025, Trump labeled "Antifa" a "domestic terrorist organization," and issued an executive order to all federal agencies to investigate it. ICE acting director, Todd Lyons, said in an interview that ICE will investigate anti-ICE protester networks, "to track the money. We are going to track these ringleaders... and... professional agitators." In October 2025, reporter Rachel Maddow warned that ICE's new surveillance resources — including their spyware, which she said can be covertly inserted into anyone's phone from a drone hovering over a protest — can be used to target and spy on anyone without a warrant, including any political opposition. Former government officials, Democratic politicians, and civil rights advocates, have complained that ICE is now being permitted and empowered to engage in sweeping surveillance and tracking of Americans engaging in constitutionally permissible political action.

In April 2026, acting director of ICE Todd Lyons confirmed in a letter to the House Committee on Oversight and Government Reform that the agency was using Graphite.

=== Other customers ===
Citizen Lab "identified a subset of suspected Paragon deployments, including in Australia, Canada, Cyprus, Denmark, Israel, and Singapore" and "surfaced potential links between Paragon Solutions and the Canadian Ontario Provincial Police."

== See also ==
- Surveillance abuse
