= Operation Murambatsvina =

Nationwide campaign of forcible slum clearances by the Zimbabwean government

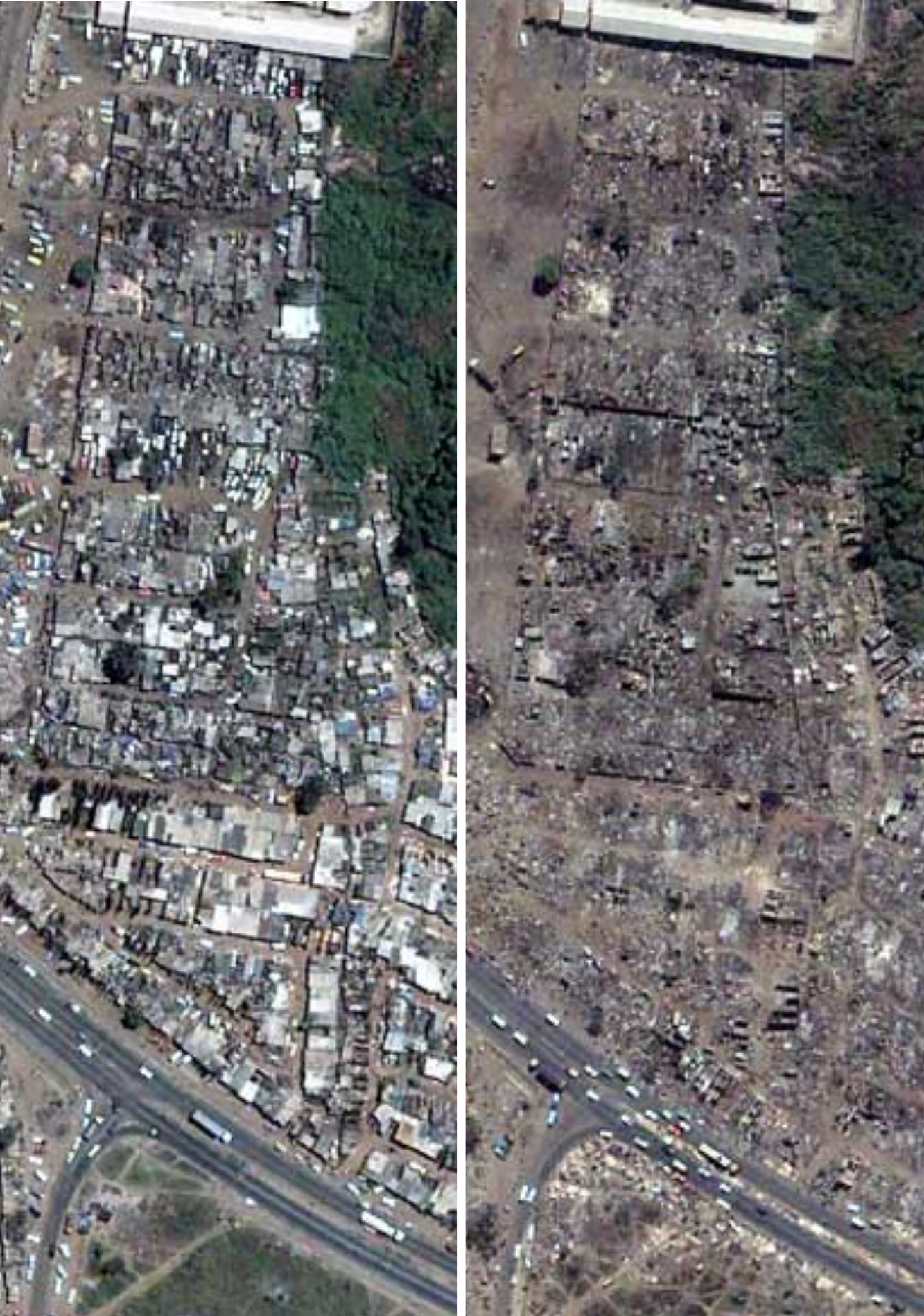
Operation Murambatsvina collage (before and after)

Operation Murambatsvina (Move the Rubbish), also officially known as Operation Restore Order, was a large-scale Zimbabwean government campaign to forcibly clear slum areas across the country. The campaign started in 2005 and, according to United Nations estimates, affected at least 700,000 people directly through loss of their homes or livelihood and thus could have indirectly affected around 1.4 million people. Robert Mugabe and other government officials characterised the operation as a crackdown against illegal housing and commercial activities, and as an effort to reduce the risk of the spread of infectious disease in these areas.

However, the campaign was met with harsh condemnation from Zimbabwean opposition parties, church groups, non-governmental organisations, and the wider international community. The United Nations described the campaign as an effort to drive out and make homeless large sections of the urban and rural poor, who make up much of the internal opposition to the Mugabe administration. Amnesty International and the Geneva-based Centre on Housing Rights and Evictions called on the UN and the African Union to intervene. UK Foreign Secretary Jack Straw urged African nations to stop ignoring what was happening in Zimbabwe, while US Secretary of State Condoleezza Rice urged the Africa Union to speak out over the "tragic" events.

== Etymology of the word "Murambatsvina" ==
The word was initially used to refer to a communal village worker by the Shona who lived in "reserves". Murambatsvina is a combination of two Shona words which are 'muramba' and 'tsvina'. The first word can be interpreted to mean "to refuse" and the second one translated means "dirt". These people were employed by the ministry of health to improve levels of sanitation in these areas, to communicate health information, etc. Police Inspector John Tupiri of Operations Manicaland decided on the name "Murambatsvina". The Zimbabwean police were ruthless in executing their duties with the result that they were dreaded by the local populace. The sense behind the word therefore mirrors the alleged purpose of the operation as asserted by the government of Zimbabwe.

== Overview ==
Scene in Chitungwiza after Operation Murambatsvina

Zimbabweans refer to the operation as "Zimbabwe's tsunami", in reference to the devastation which followed the tsunami caused by the 2004 Indian Ocean earthquake. The crackdown has affected most of the major cities in the country, and the Zimbabwean government has stated its intention to widen the operation to include rural farming areas. Estimates of the number of people affected vary considerably. The latest United Nations figures estimate that it has led to the unemployment of 700,000 people and affected a further 2.4 million people countrywide. Earlier, the Zimbabwe Human Rights NGO Forum estimated that 64,677 families had been displaced, representing a total of approximately 323,385 people (this estimate was based on figures from 45 locations). However, according to the police only 120,000 people have been affected.

Whichever figures are correct, large numbers of people have been affected, all of whom are in need of emergency relief and resettlement following the loss of their homes and livelihood. The clearances have been condemned both internally and internationally. A report written by Anna Tibaijuka, the executive director of the United Nations Human Settlements Programme, was handed to the Zimbabwean government on 21 July 2005. Excerpts from the report, which calls for all demolitions to be stopped immediately, were made public the following day and describe the operation as a "disastrous venture" which has violated international law and led to a serious humanitarian crisis. The actions of the government are described as indiscriminate, unjustified and conducted without regard for human suffering. The Washington Post on 7 February 2008, described how some men and women displaced from Harare are now walking 28 km (17 mi) – 5 hours round-trip every day to work (furthermore without breakfast), because the individual bus fare for one day now costs nearly a week's wages – ZW$10 million.

== Background ==
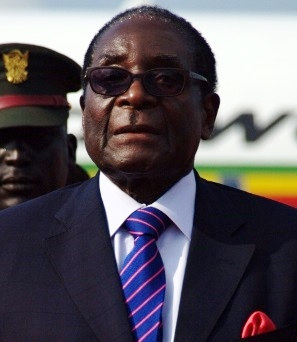
Robert Mugabe, president of Zimbabwe until 2017

Overall responsibility for the clearances rests with the ruling party, ZANU-PF. The previous Chairperson of the Harare Commission, Dr. Jameson Kurasha, initiated Operation Murambatsvina weeks after the disputed elections were held there. The Harare Commission led by Sekesai Makwavarara is currently running the affairs of the City of Harare despite the fact that there is a pending application to the High Court questioning its authority to do so. The Commission itself was appointed by Ignatious Chombo, the Minister of Local Government, Public Works and Urban Development, leading one Zimbabwean newspaper to comment that "President Mugabe, through the Minister of Local Government, Public Works and National Housing, Ignatious Chombo, is now effectively in control of the City of Harare".

Mugabe said the clearances are needed to carry out "a vigorous clean-up campaign to restore sanity" and he has described the program as an "urban renewal campaign." Chombo has described the operation in terms of 'restoring order': "It is these people who have been making the country ungovernable by their criminal activities actually." The Zimbabwean Police Commissioner, Augustine Chihuri, said that Operation Murambatsvina was meant to "clean the country of the crawling mass of maggots bent on destroying the economy."

While police have carried out most of the demolitions, they have been supported by the army and the National Youth Service. Many inhabitants have been forced to destroy their own homes, sometimes at gunpoint.

People whose homes have been demolished are being told to return to the rural areas or face further action from the Zimbabwe Republic Police and the dreaded Central Intelligence Organization. Education Minister Aeneas Chigwedere claimed that there is "nobody in Zimbabwe who does not have a rural home".

== Alternative reasons for the clearances ==
The Zimbabwean government argued that Operation Murambatsvina was about restoring order (see section above). However, the timing of the clearances, after the disputed parliamentary elections on 31 March 2005, combined with the contradictory nature of the operation, suggests alternative motivations for the demolitions.

=== Political retribution ===
The opposition Movement for Democratic Change (MDC) argued that the government's main reason for Murambatsvina was to punish the urban poor for voting for the opposition during the March parliamentary elections. The cities are traditionally MDC strongholds, and the Harare Commission that initiated the campaign was set up to override the governing powers of the elected MDC City Council. However, the retribution as a rationale is somewhat undermined by the fact that some ZANU-PF supporters, including liberation war-veterans, were in the squatter camp clearances. The hypothesis that Operation Murambatsvina was political retribution is strengthened by the recurrence of a similar operation just after the disputed 2018 election. After a demonstration staged by the urban population against the Zimbabwe Government, an order was given to the municipalities to mirror the 'tsunami' operation that saw many demolitions taking place in January 2019, leaving many people destitute.

=== Weaken the political opposition ===
Tererai Karimakwenda noted the similarity between the operation's name and the Gukurahundi campaign conducted as part of Mugabe's struggle against the Matabele tribe in the early 1980s. The Gukurahundi campaign dissolved Joshua Nkomo's Zimbabwe African People's Union (ZAPU) when it merged with Robert Mugabe's party in 1987. Karimakwenda speculated that the government attempted to force the MDC to merge with the ruling party.

Karimakwenda also argued that by forcing urban voters out into the rural areas, the cities will be de-populated of MDC supporters, enabling the government to re-populate shanty town areas with ZANU-PF supporters. Further, MDC supporters would be forced to return to areas traditionally viewed as ZANU-PF strongholds.

Science and Technology Deputy Minister Patrick Zhuwawo used state media to say that the government had demarcated nearly 10,000 residential stands at Whitecliff Farm for allocation to what he called "deserving people". The Independent interpreted this to mean "ZANU-PF supporters" and supports the view by identifying the presence of "ZANU-PF sharks" at the centre where people were meant to sign up for new stands. A different source reported that, in Bulawayo, a ZANU-PF representative was tasked with compiling a list of future stand beneficiaries, and the resulting list was dominated by known ZANU-PF supporters. One opposition supporter, whose name was not on the list, alleges that he was bluntly told he had supported the wrong party.

=== Controlling political protest ===
Potential for mass uprisings was reported in the immediate aftermath of the 2005 parliamentary elections, widely viewed by the west as neither free nor fair. Human rights advocate and outspoken government critic, Catholic Archbishop Pius Ncube publicly called for a peaceful uprising before the elections, claiming they had already been fixed.

The Sunday Times reported that, by dispersing MDC supporters to remote rural locations, the ZANU-PF government would find it easier to control an angry population in the event of possible riots or mass protests. David Coltart, the MDC's legal affairs spokesperson, described the operation as a sinister pre-emptive strike to remove the maximum possible number of people from urban areas to rural areas where they are easier to control".

The Mail & Guardian suggested former Ethiopian leader Mengistu Haile Mariam, who fled to Harare in 1991 as the Derg fell from power, may have given Robert Mugabe the idea, warning the Zimbabwean leader that the swelling slum and backyard population in Zimbabwe was creating a fertile ground for a mass uprising.

=== Risk management as part of future government reform ===
The Zimbabwe Human Rights NGO Forum advanced another reason for pre-emptively dispersing citizens living in opposition party strongholds. They point to the fact that the government faces an unprecedented economic crisis of fuel and food shortages, rampant hyperinflation, and virtually no foreign currency. To resolve the crisis, they argued the ZANU-PF government would be forced, against its will, to re-engage with the international community:

This means a reversal of its whole style of governing, adherence to the rule of law, an end to political violence and repression, opening of the press and media space, and a cessation of all interference with citizens basic freedoms.

They suggested that if totalitarian controls were relaxed – to satisfy international principles and standards – the government would suddenly be exposed to protest and civic pressure. In other words, Operation Murambatsvina may have been less motivated by fear of protests immediately following the elections (which were manageable by a politicised police and army), instead aiming to control the population after heavy-handed measures were dispensed with:

It is predicated on the observation that the greatest risk to repressive governments comes when they seek to liberalise.

Zimbabwean 2005 election experiences give some credence to this view. Anticipating electoral observers coming to the country, the government eased up on a few of its repressive tactics in the months immediately preceding the parliamentary elections. The immediate effect was that MDC supporters felt confident and suddenly openly showed their support for their party in a way they hadn't been able to before.

=== Regain control of foreign currency dealings ===
In the early 2000s, Zimbabwe fought to keep control of the foreign currency market by adopting a range of measures, usually spearheaded by Reserve Bank Governor Gideon Gono. Sokwanele, a Zimbabwean civic action support group, describes Gideon Gono as having played a major role in Operation Murambatsvina. In fact, Gideon Gono's appointment to Governor coincided with the beginning of a crackdown on illegal foreign currency dealings prompting one popular source of independent news to report that "one of his key areas of focus is the illegal foreign currency market".

Sokwanele, in a different article, explains that the foreign currency market in Zimbabwe is broadly characterised by the formal market, the parallel market and the black market. They describe the black market as follows:

Black market transactions happen on the streets, in the flea markets, and in back-rooms; sometimes for small sums of money like 20 US dollars; and the deals often take place between individuals.

The government targeted the small-scale black market traders through Operation Murambatsvina. The Age, an Australian newspaper, reported on how informal vendors at one market, dubbed "The World Bank", maintains a façade of trading goods when their real business is dealing in hard cash, albeit very small amounts at a time. (Bulawayo's "The World Bank" was targeted when Gono first become Governor of the Reserve Bank in [2003].)

=== Supporting the "Look East" policy ===
ZANU-PF's drive towards resolving its economic crisis has included strengthening its historical ties with China. The state-controlled newspaper The Herald reported on Robert Mugabe's support for Operation Murambastvina, and on his view that the economy was beginning to receive serious and significant investments from the Far East:

We should not look back, for, looking back, means back to our political enemies and detractors. Industry must recognise this new direction (Look East policy).

The destruction of the shanty towns may have supported Chinese business interests in Zimbabwe. A report co-authored by Archbishop Ncube stated that:

Speculation over the motives behind Operation Murambatsvina has pointed to the removal of local competition threatening newly arrived Chinese businessmen whose stores sell cheap and often poor quality goods. It is estimated that, as a result of the government's aggressive "Look East" policy, up to 10,000 Chinese citizens have moved into the country, and some have moved onto farms taken from highly skilled commercial farmers, notably to grow tobacco for China's 300 million smokers.

As well as practical support of Chinese business interests, many have suggested that Operation Murambatsvina also demonstrates an adherence to a 'Look East' ideology and is evidence that Zanu-PF has embraced an Asian model of government where individual rights are often subverted for the good of the masses, or the regime. Robert Mugabe's approach to governance has prompted regular comparisons between him and Pol Pot.

== Condemnation ==
=== Zimbabwean responses ===
Operation Murambatsvina has been widely condemned by Zimbabwean non-governmental organisations, churches, legal organisations, and the opposition Movement for Democratic Change as well as many other groups in Zimbabwe.

The operation also made topics for those in the literature world with Valerie Tagwira with her book The Uncertainty of Hope, which vivified mostly the effects of Operation Murambatsvina on the ordinary female citizens of Zimbabwe and other difficulties faced by that time. The other known literature figure who hand penned the happenings of the era is a young poet and script writer, Poseidon Tsautsau who wrote his poem:The Uncaring father, who should care. In his poem it seems like Tsautsau is blasting Mugabe the Zimbabwean father for not caring for his children, by "cleaning the mess through adding trash" as he writes in his piece.

=== International responses ===
The international community has also condemned the operation with nations and international organisations strongly attacking the Zimbabwean government's policy.

Kate Hoey MP called on former British Prime Minister Tony Blair to encourage South Africa to use its regional influence to put pressure on Zimbabwean authorities to cease the crackdown.

The New Zealand Minister of Foreign Affairs Phil Goff expressed his condemnation of the operation by suggesting in a radio interview a boycott of the planned tour by the Zimbabwean cricket team of New Zealand in 2005–06.

Condoleezza Rice, then United States Secretary of State, called upon African leaders to speak out against the Operation and to increase pressure on the Zimbabwean authorities to end the evictions. The African Union has rejected these calls stating it has 'more serious concerns'. For example, then South African President Thabo Mbeki questioned why Western leaders were so concerned about Zimbabwe while not paying the same amount of attention to far more dire African emergencies, such as civil war in the Democratic Republic of Congo.

=== United Nations ===
Kofi Annan, then UN Secretary-General, dispatched special envoy Anna Tibaijuka to Zimbabwe to study the effects of the campaign and report back her findings. The report is highly critical of the government, prompting one news source to say that the report used "language unusually harsh for the United Nations". Excerpts of the report describe the operation as disastrous and inhumane, representing a clear violation of international law. The executive summary stated:

Operation Restore Order, while purporting to target illegal dwellings and structures and to clamp down on alleged illicit activities, was carried out in an indiscriminate and unjustified manner, with indifference to human suffering, and, in repeated cases, with disregard to several provisions of national and international legal frameworks.

On 23 May 2007 the Geneva-based Centre on Housing Rights and Evictions and another group, Zimbabwe Lawyers for Human Rights, sought independent legal opinion. This concluded that the evictions in Zimbabwe were a widespread and systematic attack against a civilian population, as part of state policy.

== Zimbabwe Government response to UN report ==
In a 45-page response to the highly critical report by UN envoy Anna Tibaijuka, President Robert Mugabe's government says it acted in the public interest, and denied that it was responsible for the deaths of several people during clean-up operation, and was carried out in compliance with the government's laws, the state-controlled Herald newspaper reported on 17 August 2005.

The government said Tibaijuka had used value-laden and judgemental language, which clearly demonstrated in-built bias against it and the operation.

== See also ==
- Operation Mavhoterapapi
- Operation Dzikisai Madhishi
