= 2010 G20 Toronto summit protests =

- Part of the anti-globalization movement
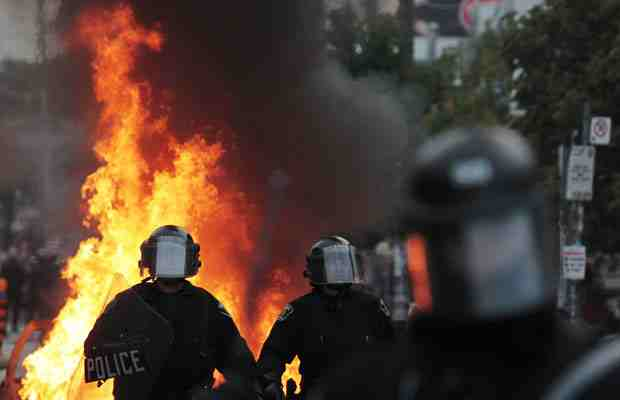
- Riot control emerge as a police car burns in the background in Toronto on 26 June
- Date: June 18–28, 2010
- Location: Toronto, Ontario, Canada
- Methods: rally, demonstration, rioting, vandalism

Casualties
- Injuries: 39 reported injuries during arrests; 97 police officers
- Arrested: 1,000+

Public protesting and demonstrations began one week ahead of the 2010 G20 Toronto summit, which took place in Toronto, Ontario, Canada on 26−27 June.

Protests mainly consisted of peaceful demonstrations and rallies but also took the form of a riot as a group of protesters using black bloc tactics caused vandalism to several businesses in Downtown Toronto. More than 20,000 police, military, and security personnel were involved in policing the protests, which at its largest numbered 10,000 protesters. While there were no deaths, 97 officers and 39 arrestees were injured, and at least 40 shops were vandalised, constituting at least C$750,000 worth of damage. This overpowered the actual message of the protest, such as climate change and global economic inequality.

Over 1000 arrests were made, making it the largest mass arrest in Canadian history. In the aftermath of the protests, the Toronto Police Service and the Integrated Security Unit (ISU) of the G20 Toronto summit were heavily criticized for brutality during the arrests and eventually went under public scrutiny by media and human rights activists. There has been legal action in the form of a class action lawsuit towards the Toronto police on behalf of all of those who were arrested despite the Toronto Police's several attempts to stop court proceedings by appealing the case. As of November 10, 2016 The Supreme Court of Canada ruled that it will not hear the Toronto Police Services Board's appeal. As a result, a class action lawsuit was able to proceed on November 25, 2016 towards trial. On August 17, 2020, The Canadian Press announced that the lawsuit had resulted in a $16.5 million settlement. Those arrested were each awarded dollar amounts ranging from $5,000 to $24,700.

== Early events ==
The Royal Canadian Mounted Police (RCMP) and members of the Joint Intelligence Group (JIG) began approaching activists in February 2010. There were visits to organization offices, meetings, and activists' houses. It was later revealed via Freedom of Information requests that "at least 12 undercover officers infiltrated groups" spanning Vancouver, southern Ontario, Toronto, Montreal, and Ottawa, in one of the largest-ever such operations internal to Canada.

A Royal Bank of Canada branch in Ottawa was firebombed just before dawn on May 18, 2010. The attackers posted video on YouTube showing a large fireball igniting inside the bank. The video then listed the manifesto of a previously unknown group calling itself the FFFC. The message stated that the attack against the bank was because of the growing suffering of Vancouver's poor in the shadow of RBC's major sponsorship of the 2010 Vancouver Olympics and Paralympics in Vancouver and Whistler, British Columbia and claimed these events were held "on stolen indigenous land."

In addition to social issues and aboriginal land claims, the video claimed the actions were sparked by environmental and deforestation related concerns surrounding the Alberta tar sands projects in "Canada's" prairies, in which the video claims RBC is substantially involved and which G8/G20 decisions furthered. The attackers also stated their intention to be present during the G8 and the G20 Toronto summits the following month.

The projected recurrence of such acts of violence and the escalating rhetoric of anti-summit protest plans caused the G8/G20 Integrated Security Unit (ISU) to increase its security measures. The attacks were quickly and widely criticized by the media, politicians, and other protest groups

Three suspects were arrested on June 19, 2010; with one, Roger Clement, being convicted in December 2010 while charges against the other two were stayed for lack of evidence although only one of those two faced charges for the arson, while the other's charges were for a separate vandalism of a different RBC ATM. Clement, a 58-year-old retired federal government employee, formerly working for the Canadian International Development Agency, eventually received a 3½ year prison sentence, that included 6 months for vandalism of another RBC branch in February 2010. An undercover police agent who had infiltrated the local activist community was revealed during the fire-bombing trial.

Initial estimates of the damage, immediately following the attack, set the price-tag at around $300,000 and projected that the bank would be closed for several weeks. At the time of Clement's trial, reports stated that the branch was closed for months with total costs of $1,600,000.

An individual was arrested for vandalism on May 28, after being caught spray-painting anti–G20 slogans on windows and automated teller machines in Downtown Toronto. Two individuals were arrested in London, Ontario after attaching posters to public property encouraging disruption of the G20 summit and canvassing protests.

Key groups which organized early in opposition to the summit included Canadian Labour Congress, Council of Canadians, Greenpeace, Ontario Coalition Against Poverty, Ontario Federation of Labour, Oxfam and the Toronto Community Mobilization Network.

== Week prior to summit ==
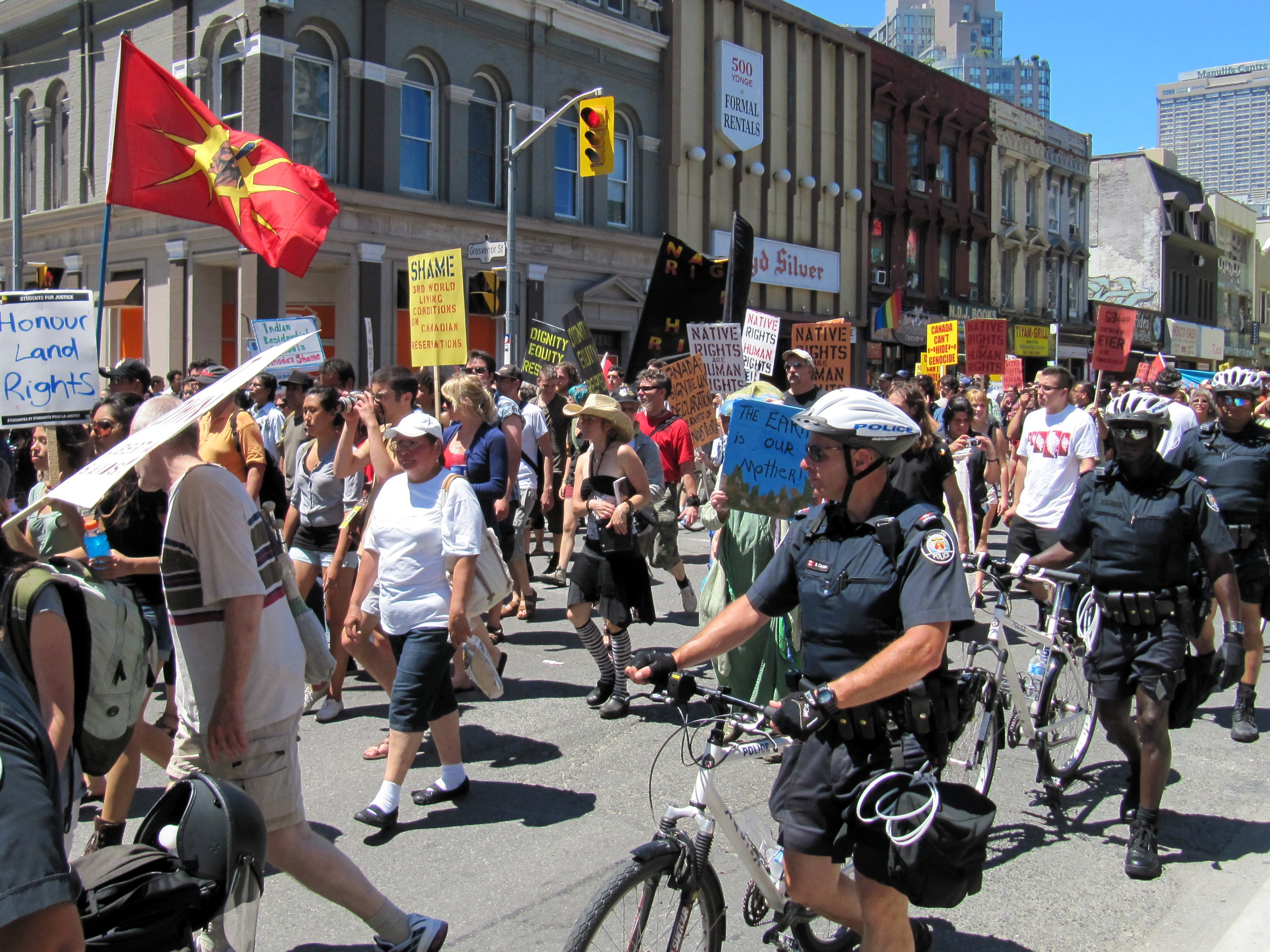
An early demonstration on Yonge Street on June 24 demanding respect of First Nations treaty rights

A small rally was conducted on June 17 in the Financial District by Oxfam Canada, urging Canada to end fossil fuel subsidization and take action on world poverty. The rally also spoofed the summit's high security cost.

An anti-poverty protest occurred on June 21, causing traffic congestion. About 100 protesters marched from Allan Gardens on Sherbourne Street and continued on Yonge Street, Dundas Street, and Isabella Street. Police officers on bicycles and military helicopters patrolled the protest; one arrest was made. A few protesters also attempted to occupy an Esso gas station, claiming corporations like Esso "have caused irreparable damage all over the world". Other protester concerns were the Arab–Israeli conflict, capitalism, and the G8 and G20 summits. The protest was led by a Guelph-based group called Sense of Security, an anti-poverty group that was also supported by the Ontario Coalition Against Poverty.

The following day, about 200 people from Toronto's gay community marched through downtown attempting to raise awareness on LGBT rights. Protesters chanted, "We're queer, we're fabulous, we're against the G20." The Canadian Broadcasting Corporation (CBC) labelled the protests as "peaceful" overall.

The first sizable G20 protest, of about 1000 people, took place on June 24 with First Nations groups and supporters from across Canada demanding respect for treaty rights from the government. Demonstrations moved from Queen's Park to the Toronto Eaton Centre along University Avenue and Queen Street West. Concerns of protesters were Canada's failure to sign the United Nations' Declaration on the Rights of Indigenous Peoples and the fact that no aboriginal chiefs were invited to the summits.

Also on June 24, activist Jaggi Singh, spokesperson for the group No One Is Illegal, suggested in a news conference that some protesters intended to attempt to breach the security fence in the coming days.

A larger protest was scheduled for June 25 in Toronto, the day the 36th G8 summit began in Huntsville, Ontario. Protesters attempted to enter the security zone, but were later forced to return by police officers. By evening, protesters set up a tent city at Allan Gardens and stayed overnight to resume protests the following day, the opening of the G20 summit.

== During the summit ==
=== June 26: Riots and vandalism ===
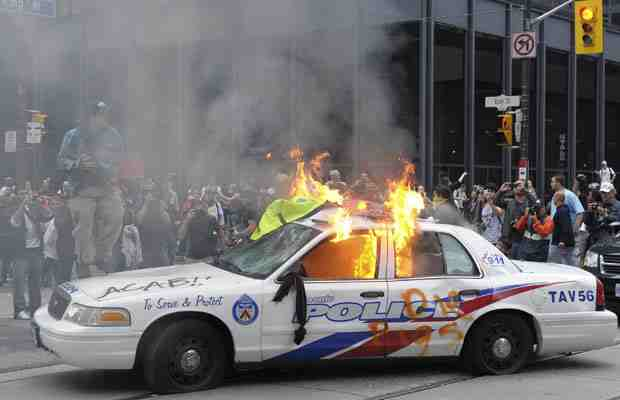
A rioter on top of a Toronto Police Service cruiser in flames

As the G20 leaders arrived in Toronto after the G8 summit in Huntsville, Ontario wrapped up, a large group comprising as many as 10,000 people protested downtown during the afternoon of June 26. At the protest, Jeff Atkinson, spokesperson for the Canadian Labour Congress, said, "We don't want G20 countries to cut stimulus spending until jobs recover." Greenpeace International director Kumi Naidoo reasoned that "if G20 governments could spend billions of dollars to rescue banks in trouble, why not find money to help unemployed workers for the environment and for social causes." Sid Ryan of the Ontario Federation of Labour said in a speech, "It wasn't the workers of the world that caused the financial crisis. We don't want to see a transfer of wealth from the public sector to the private sector."

According to eyewitness accounts, about 200 marchers broke away from the protest route on Queen Street and headed south on Bay Street towards the convention centre, through Financial District. The media would describe the break-off as led by the black bloc, with demonstrators covering their bodies and faces in black clothes. Individuals using the same black bloc tactics have been suspected of being responsible for confrontations in other international summit protests. Protesters dispersed to damage buildings and vehicles. The intent as interpreted by some media was to distract police forces from the security zone so that other protesters could break in, but police maintained their blockades, protecting the fence. Vandals smashed the windows of various office buildings and stores along Yonge Street, Queen Street West and College Street using hammers, flag poles, umbrellas, chunks of pavement and mailboxes. Conflicts also erupted between purported anarchists and journalists who were recording property destruction. After a few hours, many black bloc demonstrators changed into civilian clothes and dissolved into the larger crowd as security forces began to increase in presence. Police later maintained that some protest organizers were complicit in providing cover for the vandals.

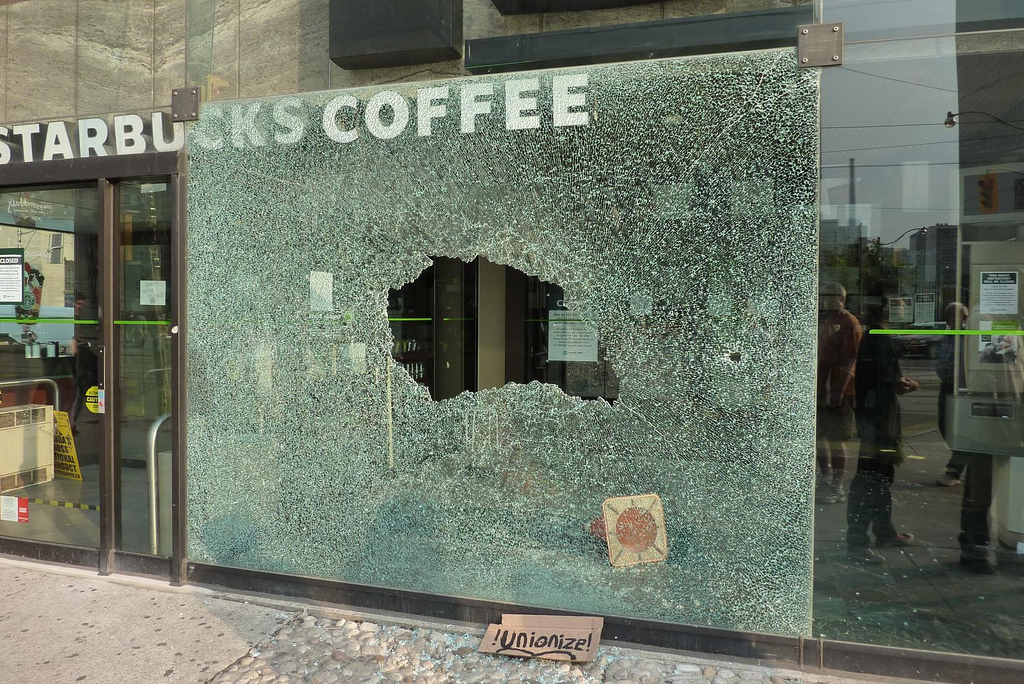
The damaged front of a Starbucks restaurant in Toronto

Several properties sustained damage to its exteriors. Toronto Police Headquarters was damaged and four Toronto Police Service cruisers were set ablaze in different locations. Media vehicles of the Canadian Broadcasting Corporation and CTV Television Network were also damaged. American corporations, such as Starbucks, appeared to be the targets of vandalism. Other retail and corporate establishments targeted were Nike, Foot Locker, Sears, McDonald's, Tim Hortons, Urban Outfitters, Pizza Pizza, Subway, Swiss Chalet, Scotiabank, Canadian Imperial Bank of Commerce (CIBC), and TD Bank. Mannequins from an American Apparel store were stolen and used to damage other stores. Several shopping centres hospitals and hotels, including the Toronto Eaton Centre, Sheraton Centre, Chelsea Hotel, Mount Sinai Hospital, Toronto General Hospital, Princess Margaret Hospital, and The Hospital for Sick Children were kept under lockdown. The escalating violence caused Dutch violinist André Rieu to cancel his concert at the Air Canada Centre at the last minute.

The Toronto Transit Commission (TTC) suspended bus, subway and streetcar services in Downtown Toronto. GO Transit suspended bus and rail services to Union Station.

Tear gas was used for the first time in the history of Toronto, being deployed in a few locations by muzzle blasts. Rubber bullets and pepper spray were also used against many protesters. At the end of the day, Toronto Police Service chief Bill Blair announced that 130 people had been arrested. Several media personnel, including a Canadian reporter for The Guardian, a CTV producer, and two photographers for the National Post, were also arrested.

Condemnations of the violence were made by Ontario premier Dalton McGuinty and Toronto Mayor David Miller. In a press conference, Miller said, "All Torontonians should be outraged. They're criminals who came to Toronto deliberately to break the law. They are not welcome in this city." Referring to damage caused by black bloc protesters downtown, he claimed that calling the attackers protesters was "not fair to the people who came to [legally] protest," and that they were in fact "criminals". In a statement, Dimitri Soudas, spokesperson for Prime Minister Stephen Harper, proclaimed, "Free speech is a principle of our democracy, but the thugs that prompted violence earlier today represent in no way, shape or form the Canadian way of life."

=== June 27: Police brutality protests ===
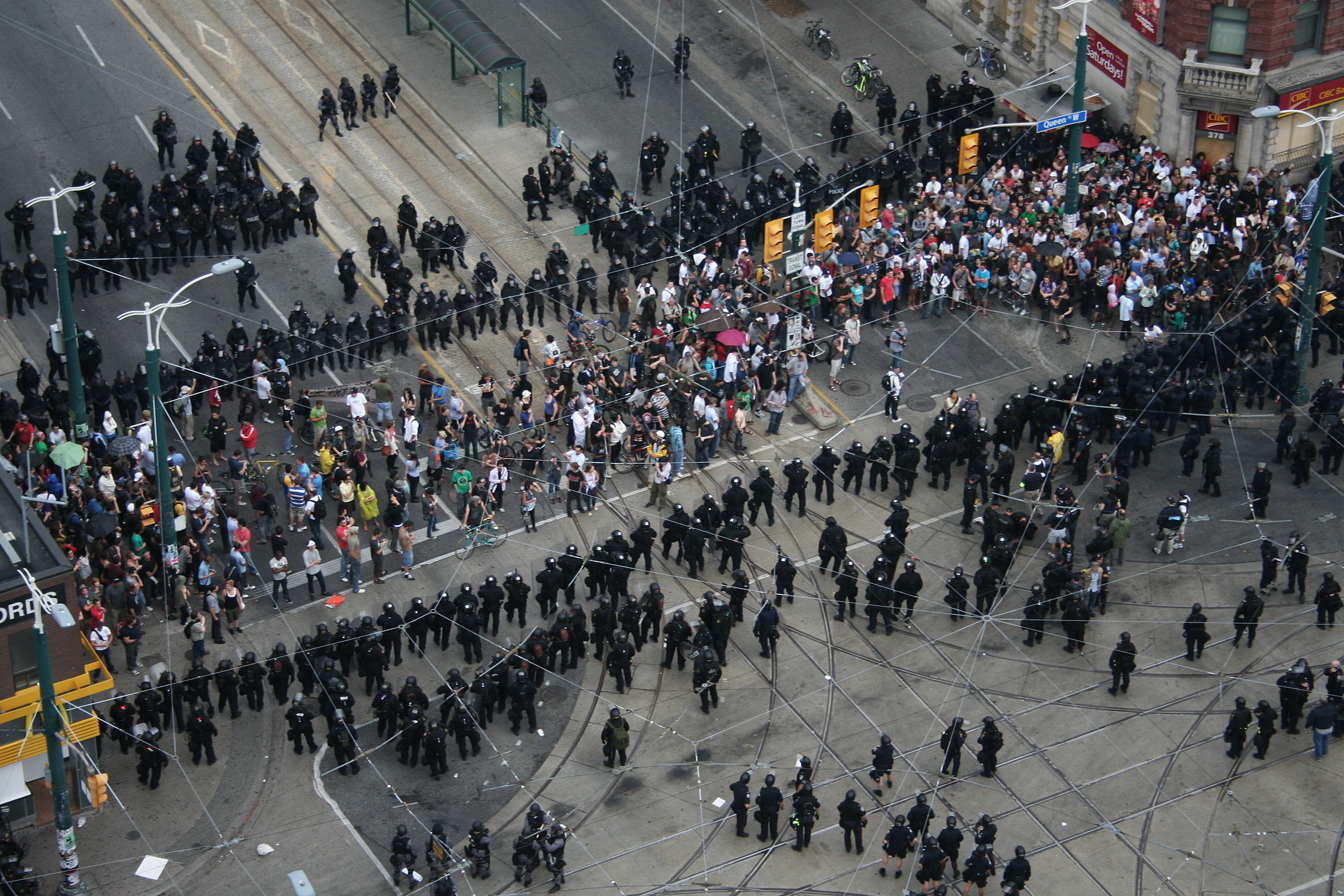
People boxed in by riot police at Queen and Spadina

Approximately 480 arrestees were taken to the Eastern Avenue temporary holding centre during the previous day's protests; police initially gave numbers ranging from 32 to 130. While those with minor charges or dropped charges were released, those with serious charges were set to appear in a courthouse located on Finch Avenue and Weston Road in North York.

After closed services throughout the night, the following morning saw the resumption of regular TTC and GO Transit services, while G20 leaders began formal discussions at the Metro Toronto Convention Centre. Lockdowns at University Avenue hospitals and the Toronto Eaton Centre were also lifted. Additional officers from the Ontario Provincial Police were deployed, doubling the total number of officers to 20,000.

Four arrests were made during the twilight of June 27 after two security guards witnessed men emerging from a manhole on Queen Street West. The manholes were later welded shut.

About 100 additional arrests were made during a morning raid by Toronto Police Service at the University of Toronto. Those arrested were said to be in possession of black clothing and "weapons of opportunity" such as bricks and sharpened stakes.

During the mid-morning, protesters marched from Jimmie Simpson Park on Queen Street East to the front of the Eastern Avenue temporary detention centre, where a "jail solidarity" bike rally and sit-in consisting of about 150 people occurred during the afternoon, with demonstrators urging the release of those arrested the previous day. Following several arrests during the rally, protesters began a sit-in interrupted by small muzzles of pepper spray and rubber bullets fired by police. At least 224 arrests occurred by evening.

Another large group assembled at the intersection of Queen Street West and Spadina Avenue, presumably to conduct a protest, but were immediately surrounded by riot police. Numerous bystanders and media personnel were also in the crowd. Several arrests were made, including several members of the media and another CTV cameraman who was briefly held and then released; police later claimed that they had found weapons at the scene, and that they suspected the presence of more black bloc protesters within the crowd. The blockade caused traffic diversions and the stoppage of streetcar service along Spadina Avenue. After several hours of detainment in record-breaking heavy rain, police released the remainder of the crowd during the night.

== Aftermath ==
=== Post-summit protests ===
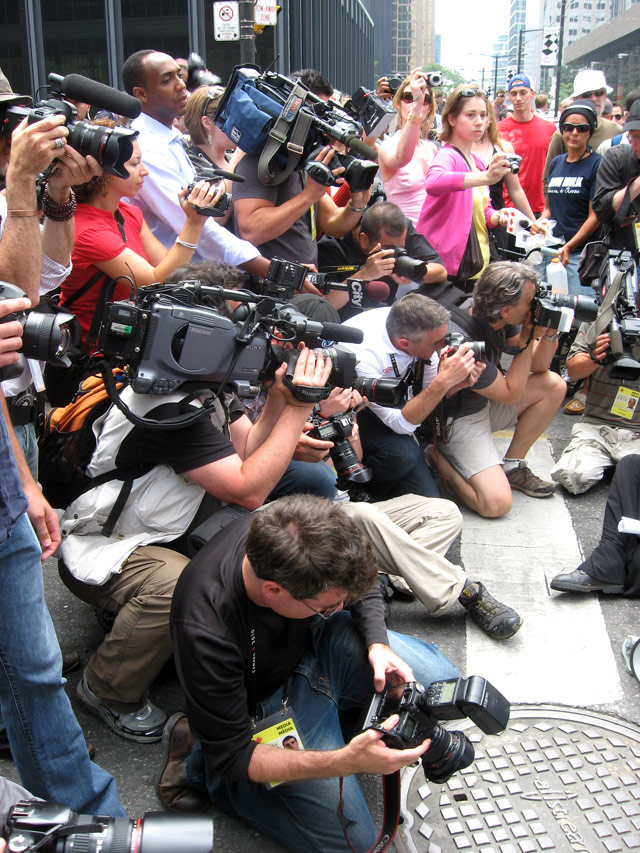
Journalists gathered at a protest at St. James Park on June 28

A total of 1118 people were arrested in relation to the G20 summit protests, the largest mass arrests in Canadian history, while nearly 800 of them were released without charge. The remaining 231 people remained with charges before the court while 58 of them have had their charges withdrawn or stayed. Smaller-scale, non-violent protests took place the following day, June 28, during the afternoon and evening. Nearly 1000 protesters marched to Toronto City Hall and Queen's Park to protest the treatment of arrested individuals at the Eastern Avenue holding centre and demanded the release of individuals still being detained, although police had earlier released several arrested on minor charges. Large numbers of Toronto Police Service officers continued to patrol the demonstrations. On June 29, a group of gay activists gathered outside a community centre where Toronto Police Service chief Bill Blair was scheduled to speak to demand his resignation for the treatment of women and homophobia within the detention centre.

=== Criticism of policing ===
On December 7, 2010, Andre Marin, Ontario Ombudsman, issued a report called Caught in the Act, an investigation into the legality of the Ontario Public Works Protection Act, and, more specifically Regulation 233/10, in Marin's words, "...known as the secret security regulation, a little known and widely misunderstood legal measure that was supposed to help the police keep the peace, but in my view wound up contributing to massive violations of civil rights."

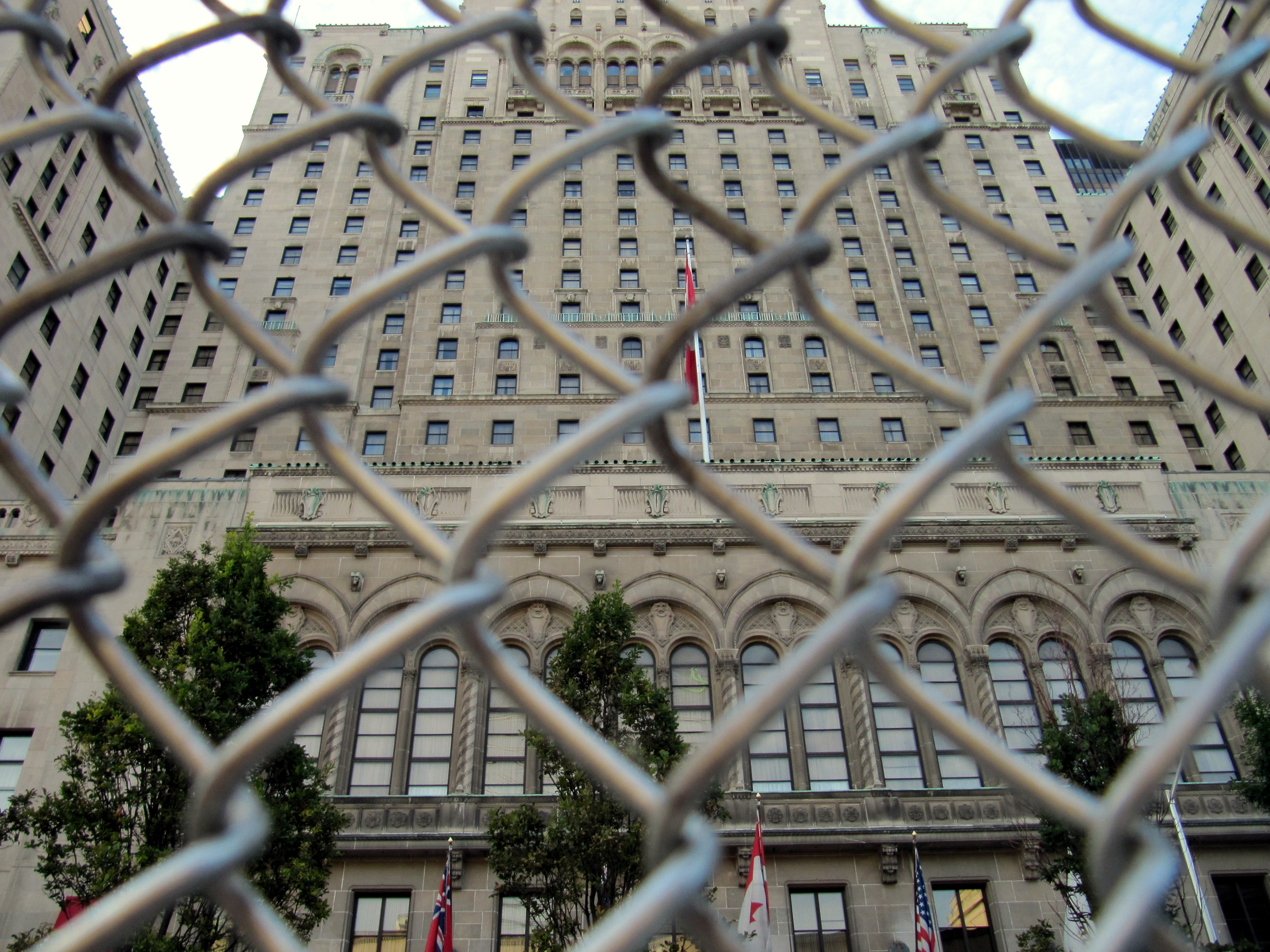
Police were allowed to arrest anyone within five metres of the fence who would neither leave nor identify themself.

A group of lawyers requested court injunctions against the Toronto Police Service from using newly purchased Long Range Acoustic Devices (LRAD), also known as sound cannons, during protests. Sound cannons have been used in previous summit protests and have the ability to produce sound at ear-piercing volumes, potentially causing hearing impairment. The Ontario Superior Court of Justice later ruled that officers can use sound cannons, with a few restrictions.

The Toronto Star reported that the Executive Council of Ontario had implemented a regulation under the provincial Public Works Protection Act on June 2 granting the ISU sweeping powers of arrest within a specific boundary during the summit; the rule was said to designate the security fence as a public works and, as such, allow any police officer or guard to arrest any individual failing or refusing to provide identification within five metres of the security zone. The regulation was requested by Toronto Police Service chief Bill Blair and debate in the legislature was not required. Orders in Council such as this one are announced in the Ontario Gazette, but the next issue of that publication was to be published after the order expired on June 28, a week after the summit ended. The new law came to light after a York University graduate student, who claimed to have been simply "exploring" the security zone but who did not provide identification when confronted by police, was arrested on June 24 under the regulation. He later vowed to file a lawsuit against the law once the summit ended. The Cabinet later confirmed that the new laws were not "special powers" and that those who were believed to have been arrested under the Public Works and Protection Act were in fact arrested under the Criminal Code. The police chief later admitted that, despite media coverage, no such five-metre rule ever existed in the law.

=== Human rights investigations ===
Individuals arrested during the protests who claimed to be bystanders not taking part in protests condemned the treatment they received from police at the Eastern Avenue holding centre. According to testimonials given to the Toronto Star and La Presse by a few arrestees, including university students, journalists, street medics, teachers, tourists, photographers, and a former mayoral candidate, "[individual] rights were violated" and "police brutality [was present]." The detention centre was described as "cold" with "barely any food or water" and "no place in the cages to even sit", and "tantamount to torture". Other allegations included harassment, lack of medical care, verbal abuse, and strip searches of females by male officers. At one point, a plainclothes officer reportedly told a detainee that the federal government had declared martial law. Blair defended the conditions in the temporary detention centre, citing the fact that every room in the centre was under video surveillance, and that to the best of the officers' abilities, occupants were read their rights. However, a Toronto Star commentator editorialized that "some of the elements of classic authoritarian detention were there, albeit in embryonic forms."

Amnesty International called for an official investigation into the police tactics used during the protests. The organization alleged that police violated civil liberties and used police brutality. The Canadian Civil Liberties Association decried the arrests and alleged that they occurred without "reasonable grounds to believe that everyone they detained had committed a crime".

Toronto Police Service held press conferences to speak out against inappropriate actions of protesters, including displaying items alleged to have been seized from protesters. However, when confronted, Chief Blair admitted that some of the items were unrelated to the G20 protests.

Police officers were also reported to attack detained journalists, while forcing other journalists to leave the scene of the protests.

=== Adam Nobody ===
Protester Adam Nobody, 27, was arrested in Queen's Park on 26 June. An amateur video uploaded to YouTube showed at least a dozen officers surrounding and beating Nobody, who was not armed and did not appear to resist. He suffered a broken nose and cheekbone, and was charged with assaulting police. These charges were eventually dropped, and a Special Investigations Unit investigation was opened into the incident. This investigation was closed without any charges laid, because the SIU was unable to identify the officers. They had covered their identification badges, police witnesses all claimed to be unable to identify them, and the arresting officer had written an invalid ID number on Nobody's arrest record.

Police chief Bill Blair insisted that a "forensic examination" had proven the video was "tampered with", removing proof that Nobody was an armed, violent criminal, but soon retracted this statement admitting he had no evidence to support it. Blair's claims led to increased attention to the case, new witnesses coming forward, and a second video corroborating the first. On 30 November the SIU re-opened its investigation, obtained the co-operation of a police officer who witnessed the incident, and laid charges against Const. Babak Andalib-Goortani. The SIU has the names of other officers involved but has not yet laid charges against them.

Blair, PM Stephen Harper and the Toronto Police were harshly criticized over the incident, with many commentators calling for Blair to resign.

== Investigation and charges against police ==
=== Babak Andalib-Goortani ===
In 2013, Andalib-Goortani was convicted of assault with a weapon for his role in Nobody's beating. The trial judge, Ontario Court Justice Louise Botham, commented that "a police officer is not entitled to use unlimited force to affect an arrest". Botham, who was brought in to Toronto from Brampton to hear the case, subsequently sentenced Andalib-Goortani to 45 days in jail. In her ruling, Botham indicated that the sentence was heavy influenced by video of Andalib-Goortani, along with a number of other officers whose disciplinary charges were dismissed, punching, kneeing, kicking, and striking the victim with a baton; stating that the period of incarceration was necessary to uphold the public's faith in the justice system.

Less than 10 minutes after Botham announced the sentence in her Brampton courtroom, a Toronto court granted bail to Andalib-Goortani pending appeal. While Andalib-Goortani awaited appeal of that assault conviction, another assault with a weapon charge, for a G20 attack on journalist/blogger Wyndham Bettencourt-McCarthy, was thrown out when the photograph taken while she was about to be hit with the baton, showing a riot-geared officer which another officer was ready to testify was Andalib-Goortani, was ruled inadmissible because the photo had been obtained through an anonymous website posting and the photographer could not be called to testify.

Some 16 months after being sentenced to jail time and released on bail, Toronto Superior Court Justice Brian O'Marra overturned the sentence and, without providing reasons for his decision, instead ordered that Andalib-Goortani do 75 hours of community service with one year's probation. In November 2015, retired Toronto judge Lee Ferrier, presiding over the Toronto Police Service's disciplinary hearing of Andalib-Goortani, docked Andalib-Goortani five days pay for the incident, thus returning the officer to patrol the streets of Toronto.

=== David 'Mark' Fenton ===
In 2014, Toronto Police Superintendent Mark Fenton, was charged with unlawful arrest and discreditable conduct in relation to the kettling incidents and faced a disciplinary hearing. Fenton was one of two major incident commanders, in charge of the Major Incident Command Centre during the summit, and was the one on duty when he ordered the kettling of protesters both at the Novotel on the Esplanade and at Queen and Spadina.

On August 25, 2015, more than five years after the Toronto G20 incidents leading to the charges, Fenton was found guilty of two counts of unlawful arrest and one count of discreditable conduct, disciplinary charges under the Ontario Police Services Act, in relation to the "kettling" of protesters and passers-by at the intersection of Queen Street and Spadina Avenue and at the Novotel hotel on the Esplanade. In rendering judgment, retired Ontario judge John Hamilton explained that "Legitimate protesters ... had the right not to be subject to arrest for making noise, chanting and sitting in the public street.". Hamilton indicated that he believed Fenton was committed to serving the public, but that he did not properly understand the constitutional right of the public to protest. In addition to the unlawful arrest convictions, Hamilton deemed Fenton guilty of discreditable conduct resultant from keeping people corralled in the streets during a severe thunderstorm while his duty was to protect them from such harsh weather; however he found him not guilty of the same charge in relation to the Novotel because those unlawfully arrested did not suffer similar hardships. Fenton was found not guilty on charges of unnecessary exercise of authority relating to the treatment of protesters after they were arrested and taken away because another officer of equal rank was in charge of the Prisoner Processing Centre; that officer was never charged.

Sentencing concluded on 15 June 2016. Regarding count one (the Novotel Misconduct) Fenton was given a formal reprimand. Regarding count two (the Queen and Spadina Misconduct) Fenton was sentenced to the forfeiture of 10 vacation days. Regarding count three (the Queen and Spadina Discreditable Conduct) Fenton was sentenced to the forfeiture of 20 vacation days.

Seeking a reduced sentence, Fenton subsequently appealed the decision to the Ontario Civilian Police Commission. But, after six months' deliberation, the Commission handed down a decision doubling the sentence from 30 to 60 paid vacation days. "There appears to be little or no relationship between the obvious seriousness of the misconduct and the penalty imposed," the panel wrote. "It is difficult for us to conceive how convictions for the mass arrests, found to be unlawful, of hundreds of individuals in contravention of their Charter rights are not at the more serious end of the spectrum of misconduct." The panel also noted that Fenton had been left to twist in the wind by his G20 superiors, including by former police chief Bill Blair.

== See also ==
- 2009 G20 London summit protests
- List of incidents of civil unrest in Canada
