= Black bloc =

Tactic used by groups of protesters

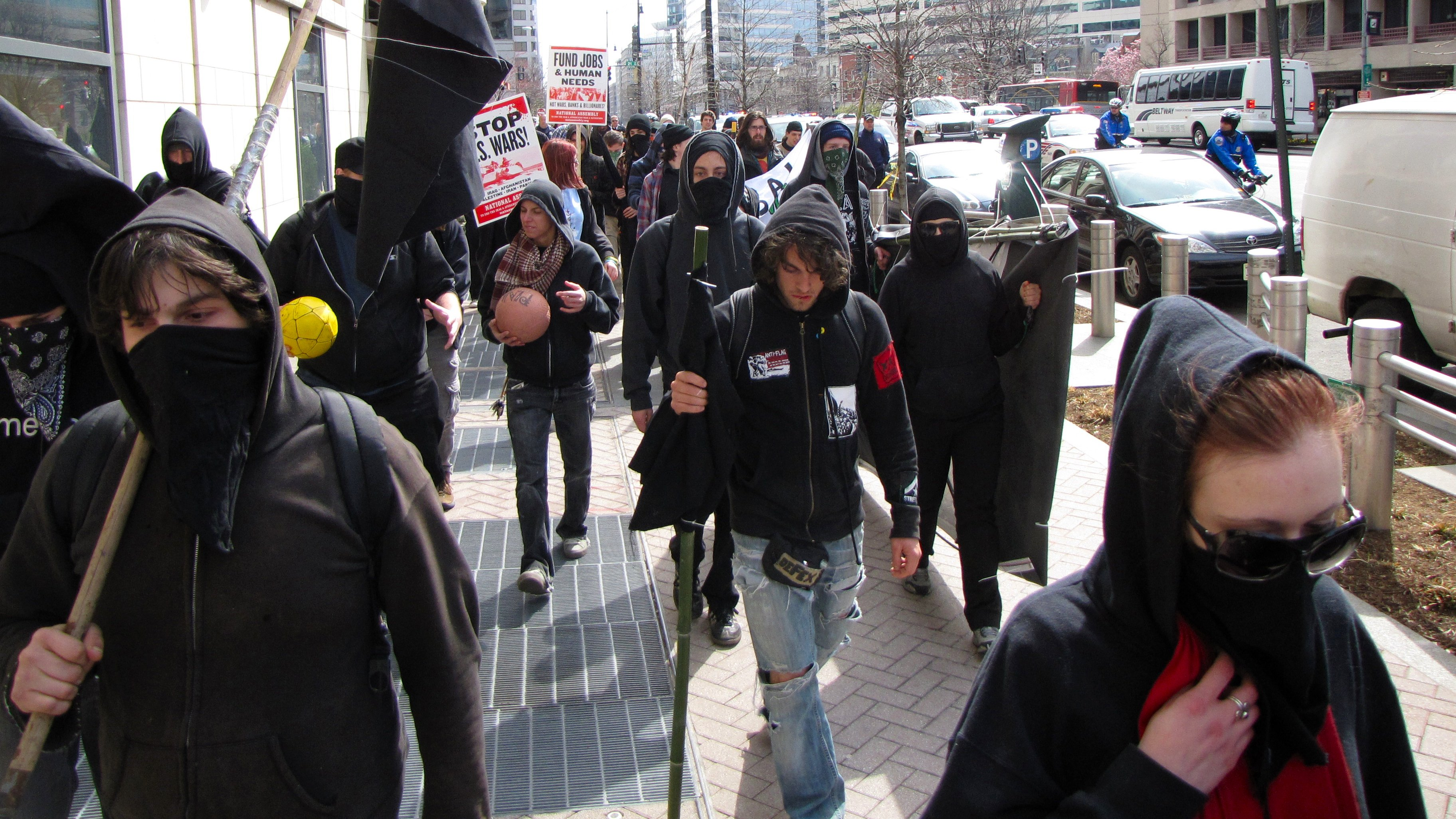
A black bloc group participating in a march near the World Bank, in Washington, DC. Some black bloc protesters wear hoods, allowing their faces to be viewed, while others use such items as scarves, dark sunglasses or masks to conceal their faces as much as possible, 2009.

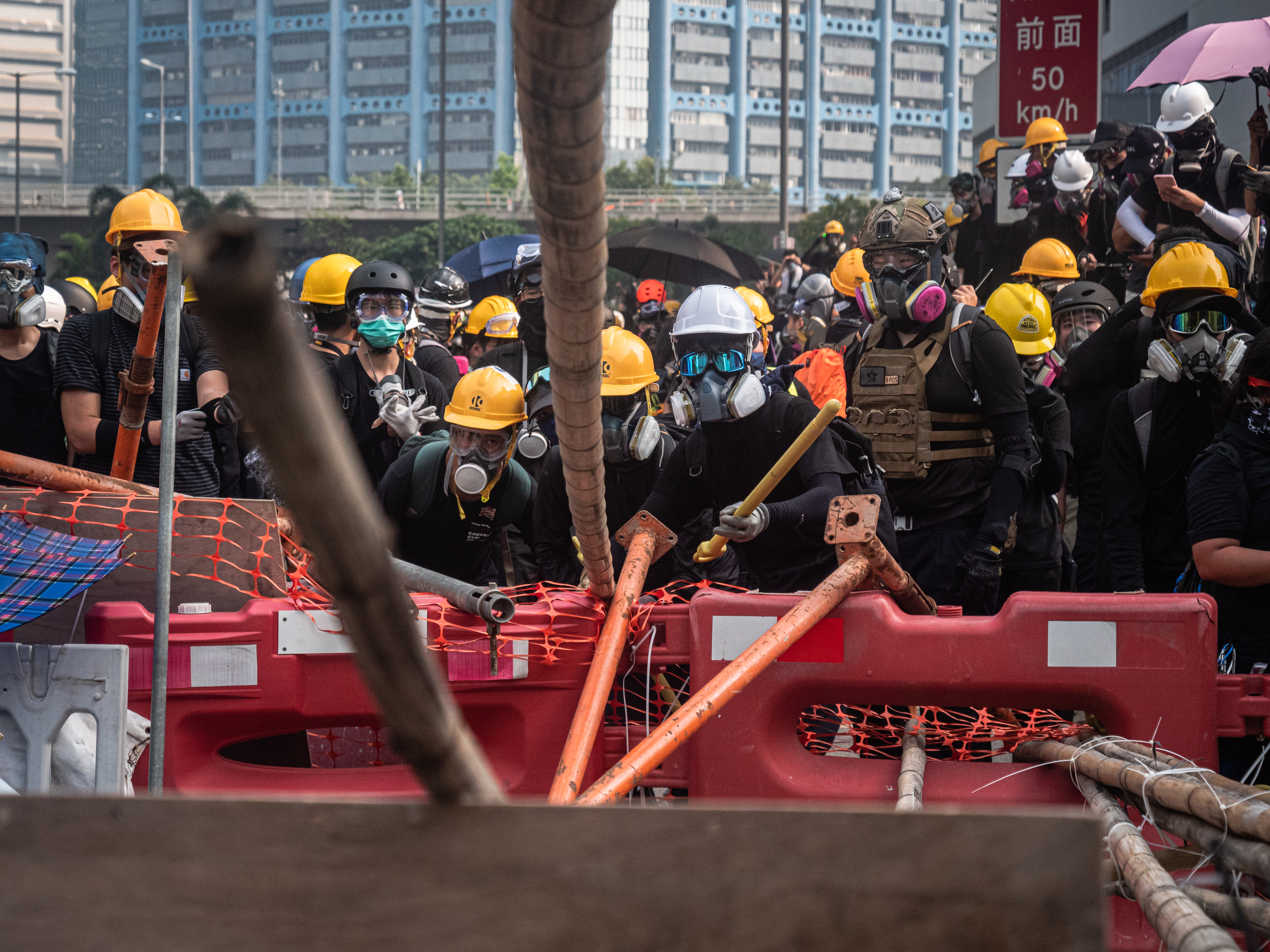
Black bloc Hong Kong protesters wearing personal protective equipment while building a barricade, 2019.

A black bloc (sometimes black block) is a tactic used by protesters — usually pro-democracy protesters or members of the far-left — who wear similar clothing including ski masks, scarves, sunglasses, and personal protective equipment including goggles, gas masks, motorcycle helmets with padding, or other face-concealing and face-protecting items that are often (but not necessarily) black. The clothing is used to conceal wearers' identities from both the police and politically opposing parties (namely members of the far-right) by making it difficult to distinguish between participants. The tactic allows the group to appear as one large unified mass, and it is also used for protection from riot control methods like pepper spray or tear gas, which are sometimes used by police during civil unrest.

Black bloc participants are often associated with anarchism and affinity groups. A variant of this type of protest is the padded bloc, where Italian Tute Bianche protesters wore white padded clothing to protect against the police. Notable intellectuals who have defended the tactic include David Graeber, while notable intellectuals who have opposed the tactic include Chris Hedges.

The tactic was developed in the 1980s in the European autonomist movement's protests against squatter evictions, nuclear power, and restrictions on abortion, as well as other influences. Black blocs gained broader media attention outside Europe during the 1999 Seattle WTO protests, when a black bloc damaged property of Gap, Starbucks, Old Navy, and other multinational retail locations in downtown Seattle. Black bloc tactics have increasingly been paired with other novel protest tactics throughout the 21st century.

== History ==
=== Precursors ===
In February 1967, the anarchist group Black Mask marched on Wall Street in New York City wearing black clothes and balaclavas. This was the first instance of a social movement in the western world utilizing masks and black dress, which were used not for purposes of disguise but to signify a militant uniform identity. In this regard, Black Mask may have indirectly influenced the black bloc tactic.

=== West German origins ===
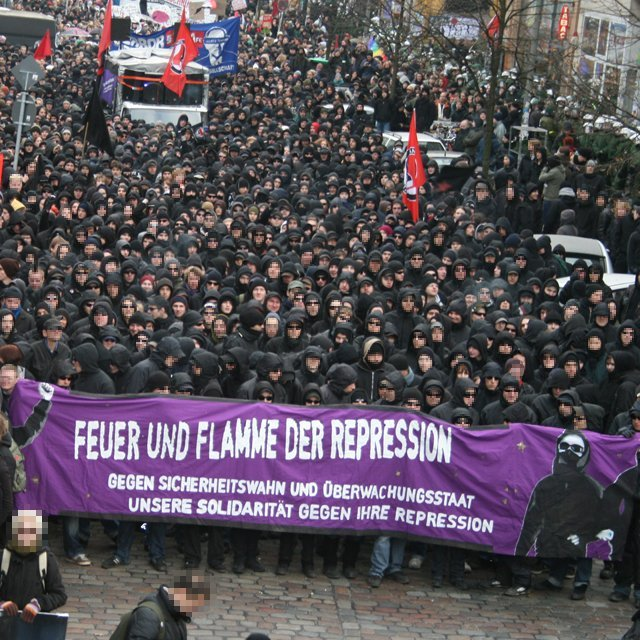
Demonstration in Hamburg/Germany with Black Bloc in the front rows

The black bloc tactic to wear black clothing, ski masks, scarves, sunglasses, motorcycle helmets with padding or other face-concealing and face-protecting items was developed in response to increased use of police force following the 1977 Brokdorf demonstration.

On 1 May 1987, demonstrators in Berlin-Kreuzberg were confronted by West Berlin police. After this, thousands of violent rioters attacked the police with rocks, bottles and Molotov cocktails. The riots at the May Day in Kreuzberg became famous after the police had to completely pull out of the "SO 36" neighborhood in Kreuzberg for several hours, and rioters looted shops together with local criminals.

When Ronald Reagan came to Berlin in June 1987, he was met by around 50,000 demonstrators protesting against his Cold War policies. This included a black bloc of 3,000 people. In November 1987, Hafenstraße residents and thousands of other protesters fortified their squat, built barricades in the streets and defended themselves against the police for nearly 24 hours. After this the city authorities legalised the squatters residence.

Since the late 1980s, Berlin's Kreuzberg district has hosted May Day clashes between anarchists and police. When the World Bank and the International Monetary Fund met in Berlin in 1988, autonomous groups hosted an international gathering of anti-capitalist activists. Numbering around 80,000, the protesters greatly outnumbered the police. Officials tried to maintain control by banning all demonstrations and attacking public assemblies. Nevertheless, there were riots and upmarket shopping areas were destroyed.

=== Unified Germany ===
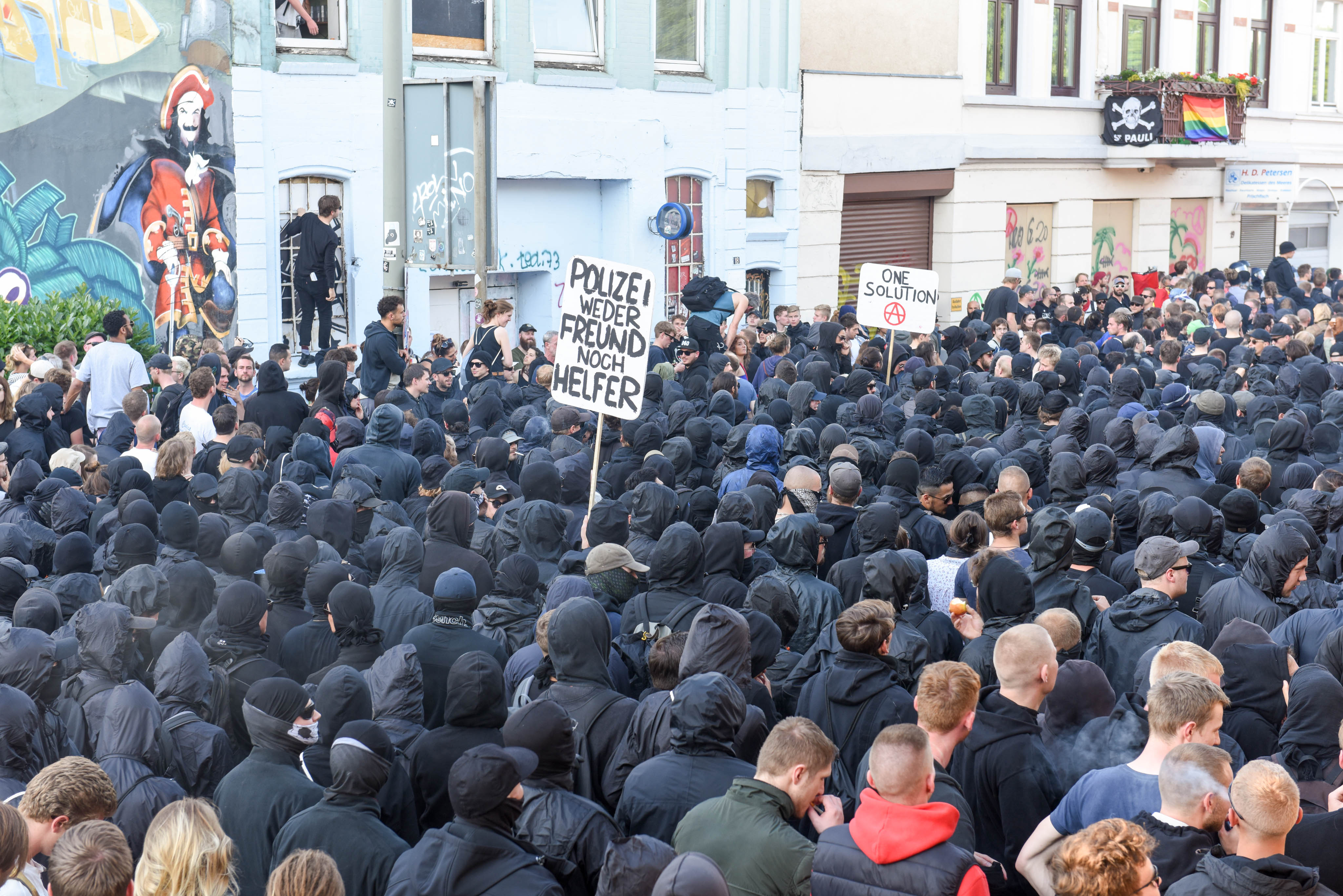
Part of a black bloc in Hamburg during the G20 summit

In the period after the fall of the Berlin Wall, the German black bloc movement continued traditional riots such as May Day in Berlin-Kreuzberg, but with decreasing intensity. Their main focus became the struggle against the recurring popularity of Neo-Nazism in Germany. The "turn" came in June 2007, during the 33rd G8 summit. A coordinated black bloc of 2,000 international people came to Rostock, Germany, built barricades, rioted the streets, set cars alight and attacked the police during a mass demonstration. 400 police officers were injured, as well as about 500 rioters, demonstrators and activists. According to the German Verfassungsschutz, the weeks of organisation before the demonstration and the riots themselves amounted to a revival for the militant left in Germany. Since the "Battle of Rostock", traditional "May Day Riots" after demonstrations every 1 May in Berlin, and since 2008 also in Hamburg, became more intense.

=== Countries ===
==== Brazil ====
During the June–July 2013 mass public demonstrations, groups of people using Black Bloc tactics started attending demonstrations, especially those held across the street from governor of Rio de Janeiro State Sérgio Cabral Filho's residence and the state government palace. Police face accusations of infiltrating the movement and, at times, acting as agents provocateurs by starting confrontations. Many leftists claim that video footage shows an infiltrated police officer throwing a molotov cocktail that wounded a riot policeman, although this has been denied by the police and hasn't been proven until today (2017). Protester violence occurred regularly during the Brazilian protests (particularly the week of 17 to 21 June) even when not linked with the black bloc, or with police infiltration.

Despite the denunciations by media, police, and even some activists, the black bloc tactic persisted in the movement. By October 2013, "The mask-wearers were welcomed by the protesters who wanted to wreak havoc during manifestations... Indeed, this sense of solidarity amidst the demonstrations, this shared manning of barricades, inspires a common determination to fight against the fear of repression." According to a report by two Brazilian leftists published in Al Jazeera, this coincided with a revival in the breadth of the street protests that had not been seen since its early days in June. On 10 October, the Rio teachers' union (Sepe) officially declared support for the recent black bloc actions, stating that the bloc were "welcome" at their demonstrations. Postings on teacher Facebook groups praised bloc participants as "fearless".

==== Canada ====
During protests against the 2010 G20 summit in Toronto, a black bloc riot damaged a number of retail locations including an Urban Outfitters, American Apparel, Adidas Store, Starbucks and many banking establishments.

==== Hong Kong ====
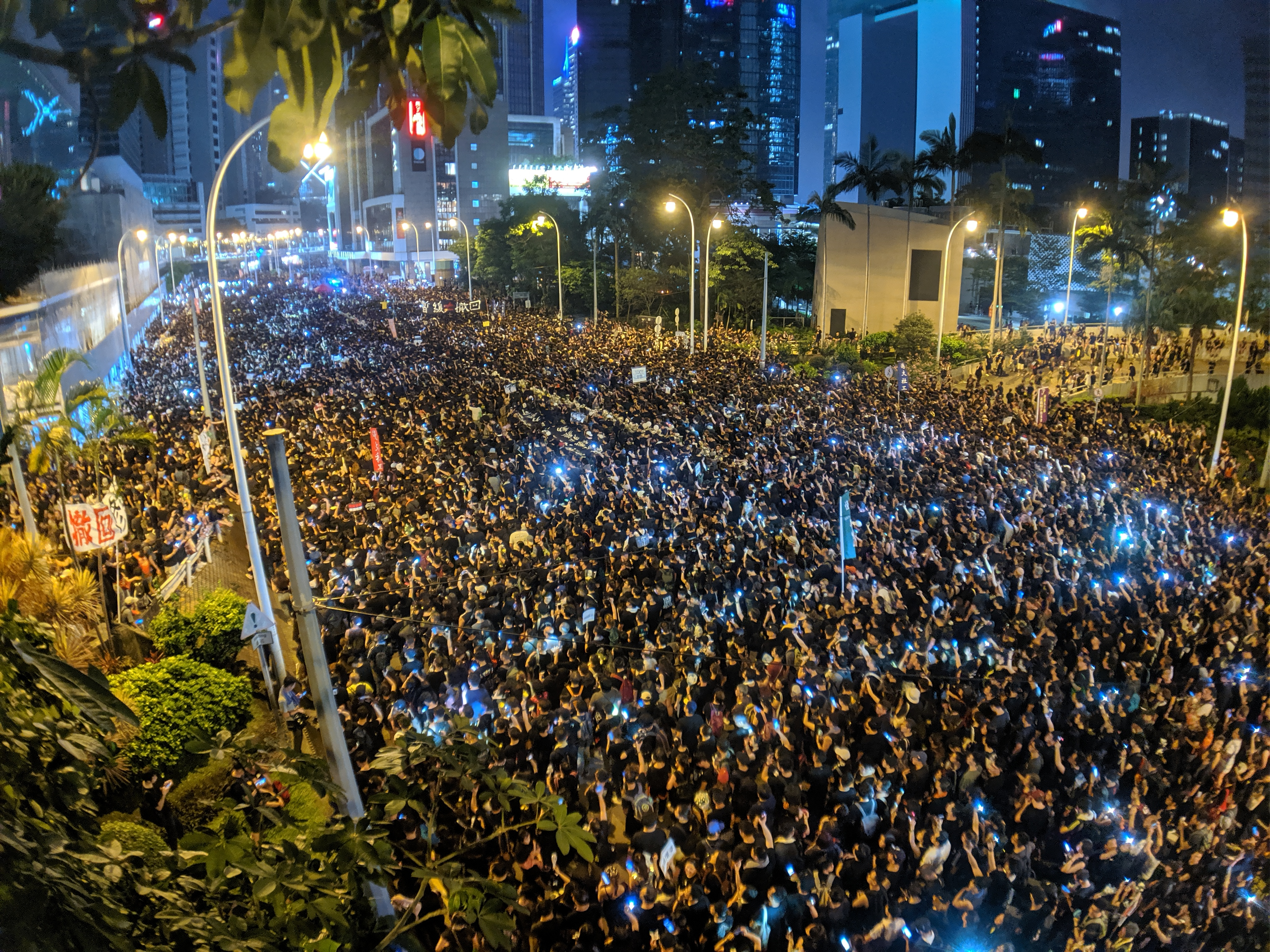
Protesters wearing black during the protests, 2019

From 2019 until 2020, protests were held in Hong Kong in response to the Hong Kong government's introduction of a bill to amend the Fugitive Offenders Ordinance in regard to extradition. It was the largest series of demonstrations in the history of Hong Kong.

During street protests, black bloc methods enhanced anonymity and privacy, enabling demonstrators to "be water" and function more effectively as a group. Participants in demonstrations dressed in black, and wore personal protective equipment such as hard hats and gloves. To resist police surveillance and protect against chemical weapons such as tear gas and pepper spray, face masks and goggles were popular attire. Protesters also developed a set of hand signs to aid communications and form human chains to transport supplies. As protests continued to escalate and the police began to use higher levels of riot control weaponry, activists upgraded their makeshift gear including using surfboards as shields. They also wore protective equipment including heat-resistant gloves and respirators. The 2014 Ukrainian Revolution was commonly described as an inspiration for Hong Kong protesters.

Protesters adopted different roles during demonstrations. Peaceful protesters chanted slogans, passed supplies, and volunteered as medics, while frontliners led the charge, extinguished tear gas with water, or neutralised them using objects such as traffic cones and kitchenware. Protesters have used laser pointers to distract the police, sprayed paint on surveillance cameras, and unfurled umbrellas to protect and conceal the identities of the group in action and to avoid facial recognition. When protesters departed via MTR, they often made piles of extra changes of clothes for other activists, and left money to purchase single-use tickets and avoid tracking via Octopus cards.

==== Europe ====
On 1 May 2018, over 1,200 black bloc took part in demonstrations in Paris, France. Public infrastructures and stores were damaged. During the demonstrations of the Yellow vests movement (autumn 2018-spring 2019) major damage was done by black bloc in Paris, Toulouse and Bordeaux. The protest resulting in the most significant amount of property damage took place in Paris when protestors took to the streets on the Champs-Élysées on 16 March 2019.

A group of about 400 black bloc demonstrators took part in the 2011 London anti-cuts protest where they targeted various high end retail outlets; according to journalist Paul Mason this may have been the largest ever black bloc assembly in the UK. Mason says some of the participants were anarchists from Europe, others were British students who joined the demonstrations after participating in the 2010 UK student protests. A black bloc protested the opening of the universal exposition Expo 2015 in Milan.

Amongst hundreds of thousands of protesters protesting the G20 Summit in Hamburg Germany were thousands of black clad rioters who clashed with police in a 3-day standoff resulting in millions of euros in property damage. At least 500 protestors were injured and more than 200 were arrested.

==== Egypt ====
On 25 January 2013, on the second anniversary of the Egyptian Revolution, black blocs made an appearance in the Egyptian political scenes where they reportedly attacked various Muslim Brotherhood headquarters and government buildings and stopped traffic and metro lines in more than eight cities. A group of young protesters, who identified themselves as the "Black Bloc", have marked the second anniversary of the Egyptian revolution by blocking the tramway tracks in Alexandria on Friday. Egyptian Prosecutor General Talaat Abdallah ordered the police and armed forces to arrest any participant in the Black Bloc, pointing out that the group was carrying out "terrorist activities" and was considered by the government and under the new constitution a violent radical outlaw group.

==== United States ====
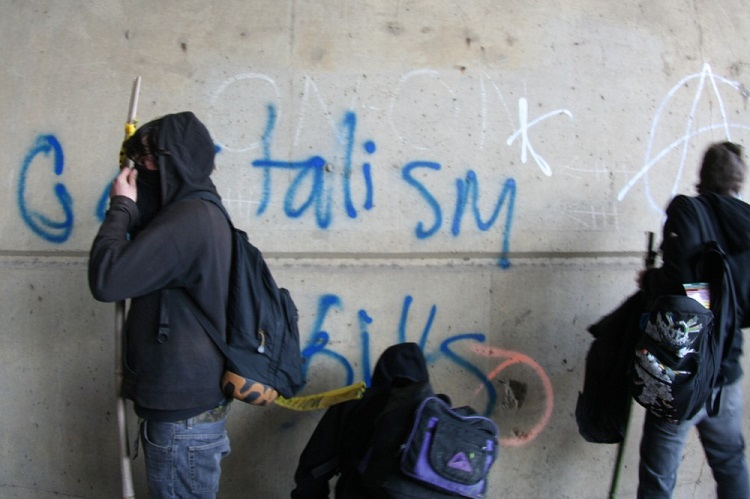
Black bloc members spray graffiti on a wall during the Iraq War protest in Washington, D.C., 2009

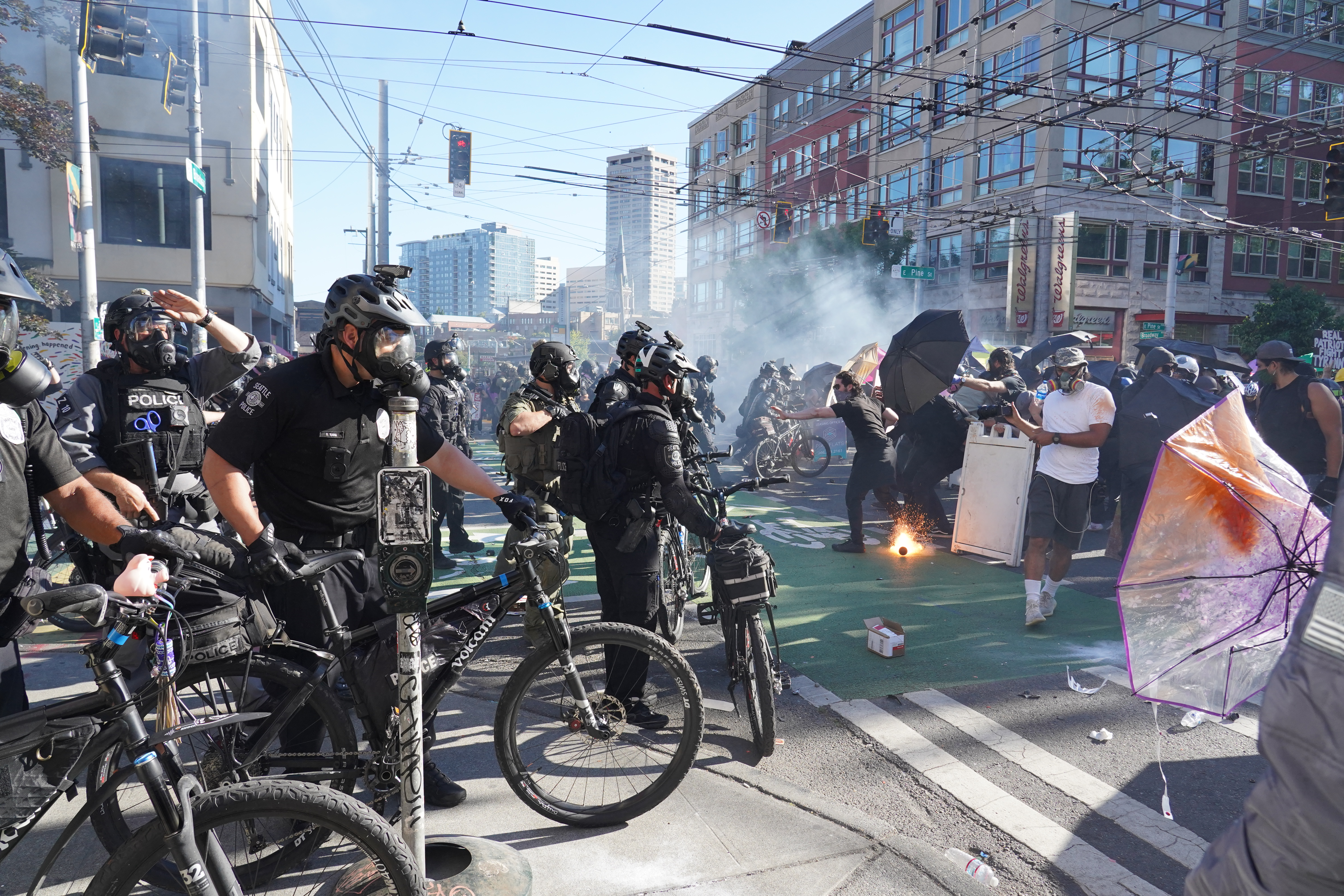
Black bloc protesters using umbrellas to protect against pepper spray during the Seattle George Floyd protests, 2020

The first prominent use of the tactic in United States of America occurred at the Pentagon, in Washington, D.C., on 17 October 1988, although anarchists had been using similar tactics in small numbers in preceding years in places like San Francisco, culminating with several hundred anarchists in black smashing glass store fronts and attacking vehicles in the Berkeley Anarchist Riot of 1989. In D.C., over one thousand demonstrators, including a small number of black bloc, called for the end of U.S. support for right wing death squads in El Salvador. A black bloc caused damage to property of GAP, Starbucks, Old Navy, and other retail locations in downtown Seattle during the 1999 anti-WTO demonstrations. They were a common feature of subsequent anti-globalization protests.

In the years after the end of the Vietnam War, protest in the US came to assume more legalistic, orderly forms, and was increasingly dominated by the middle-class. This corresponded with the rise of a highly effective police strategy of crowd control called "negotiated management". Many social scientists have noted the "institutionalization of movements" in this period. These currents largely constrained disruptive protest until 1999. In an unprecedented success for post-Vietnam era civil disobedience, the WTO Ministerial Conference opening ceremonies were shut down completely, host city Seattle declared a state of emergency for nearly a week, multilateral trade negotiations between the wealthy and developing nations collapsed, and all of this was done without fatalities. This occurred in the midst of mass rioting which had been set off by militant anarchists, some of them in a black bloc formation.

The call for the Seattle protest had originally come from Peoples' Global Action (a network co-founded by the Zapatistas) which supported diversity of tactics and a highly flexible definition of nonviolence. In the aftermath of the shutdown, however, various NGO spokespeople associated with Seattle DAN claimed that the riotous aspect of the WTO protests was counterproductive and undemocratic. They also asserted that it was only an insignificantly small group from Eugene, Oregon that engaged in property destruction. Medea Benjamin told The New York Times that "These anarchists should have been arrested", while Lori Wallach of Public Citizen stated that she had instructed Teamsters to assault black bloc participants. Barbara Ehrenreich decried the NGO leaders as "hypocrites", and wrote that nonviolent activists ought to be "treating the young rock-throwers like sisters and brothers in the struggle." She also criticized the dominant nonviolent paradigm as "absurdly ritualized". The solution to Ehrenreich's impasse was the growing acceptance of black bloc tactics in the anti-globalization movement.

During the 2011 Occupy Wall Street (OWS) protests, socialist and Christian political commentator Chris Hedges published a Truthdig column called Black Bloc: The Cancer in Occupy where he characterized "Black Bloc anarchists" as seeking physical confrontations with police; destroying property; resulting in uninvolved nonviolent protests being shut down; hijacking movements and destroying their moral authority; of being "criminal" and hypermasuline"; of provoking police to use riot control methods; and doing "what our oppressors want." His associate, activist Derrick Jensen, accused black blockers of destroying movements and using nonviolent protesters as "human shields"; said they "hate the left more than they hate capitalists"; said they are "nonstrategic" and "stupid"; and said "we have to go through the process of trying to work with the system and getting screwed. It is only then that we get to move beyond it."

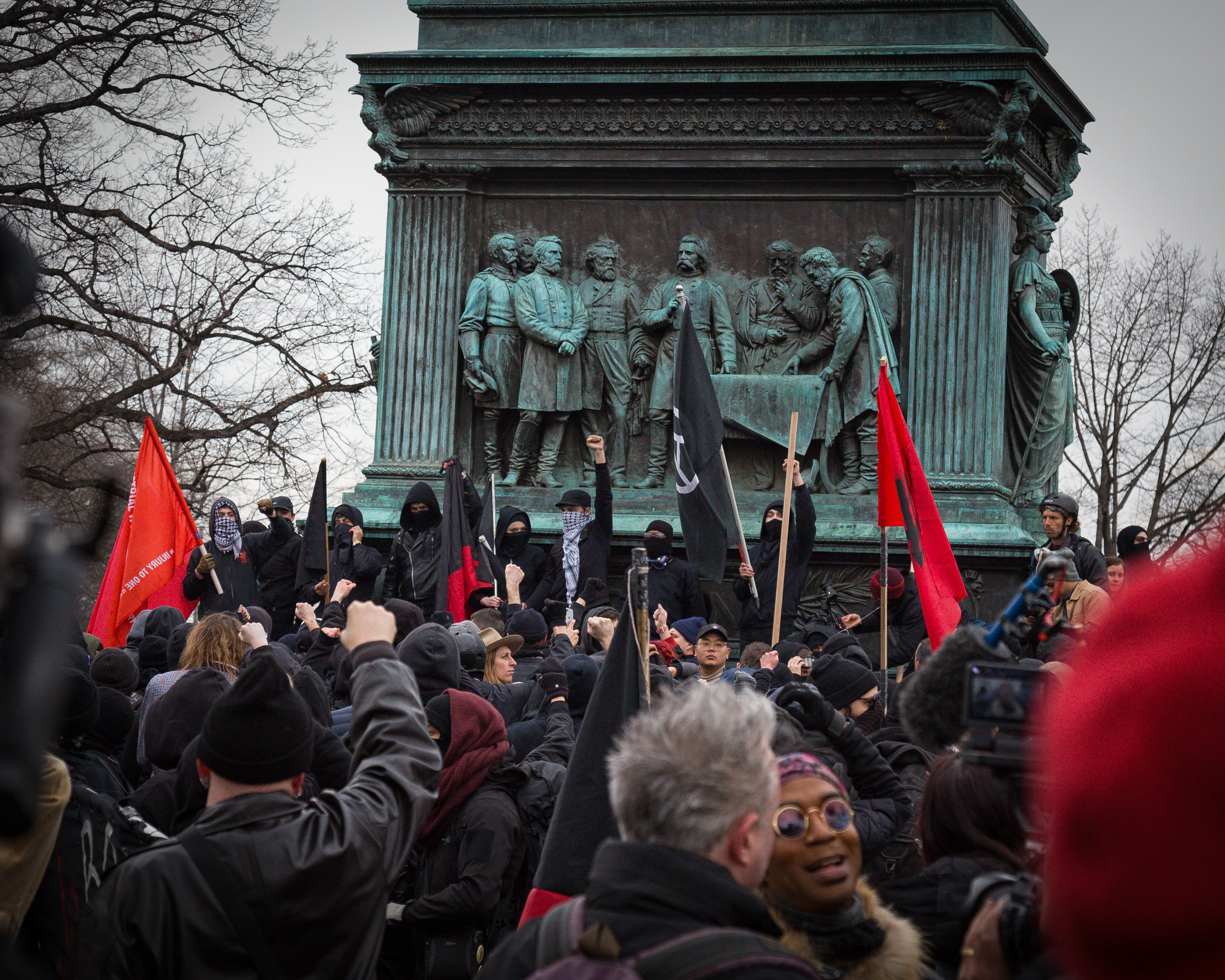
Black bloc anarchist protest in Washington, D.C. against the first inauguration of Donald Trump at the John A. Logan Monument, 2017

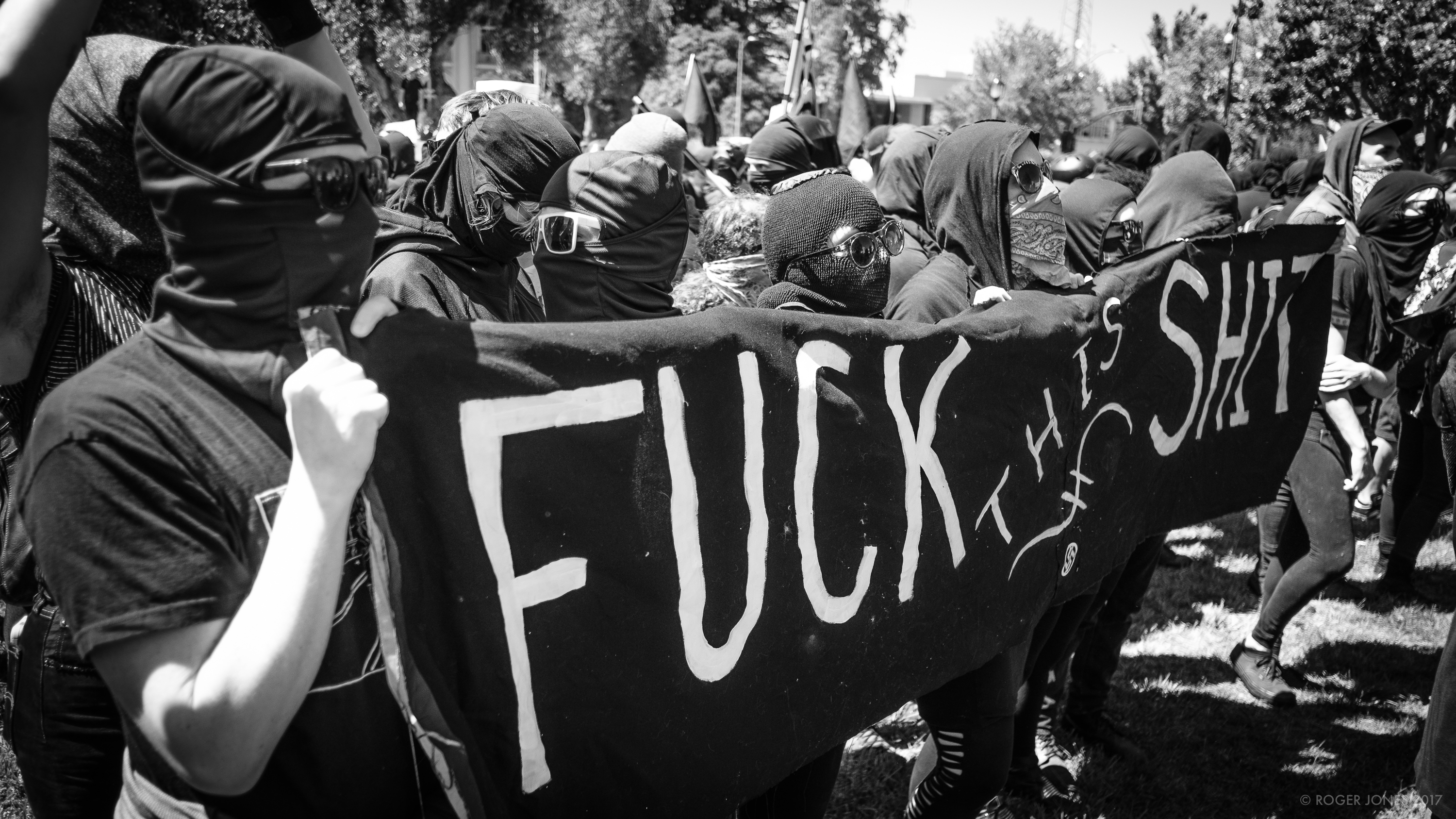
Black bloc at Berkeley, California, 2017

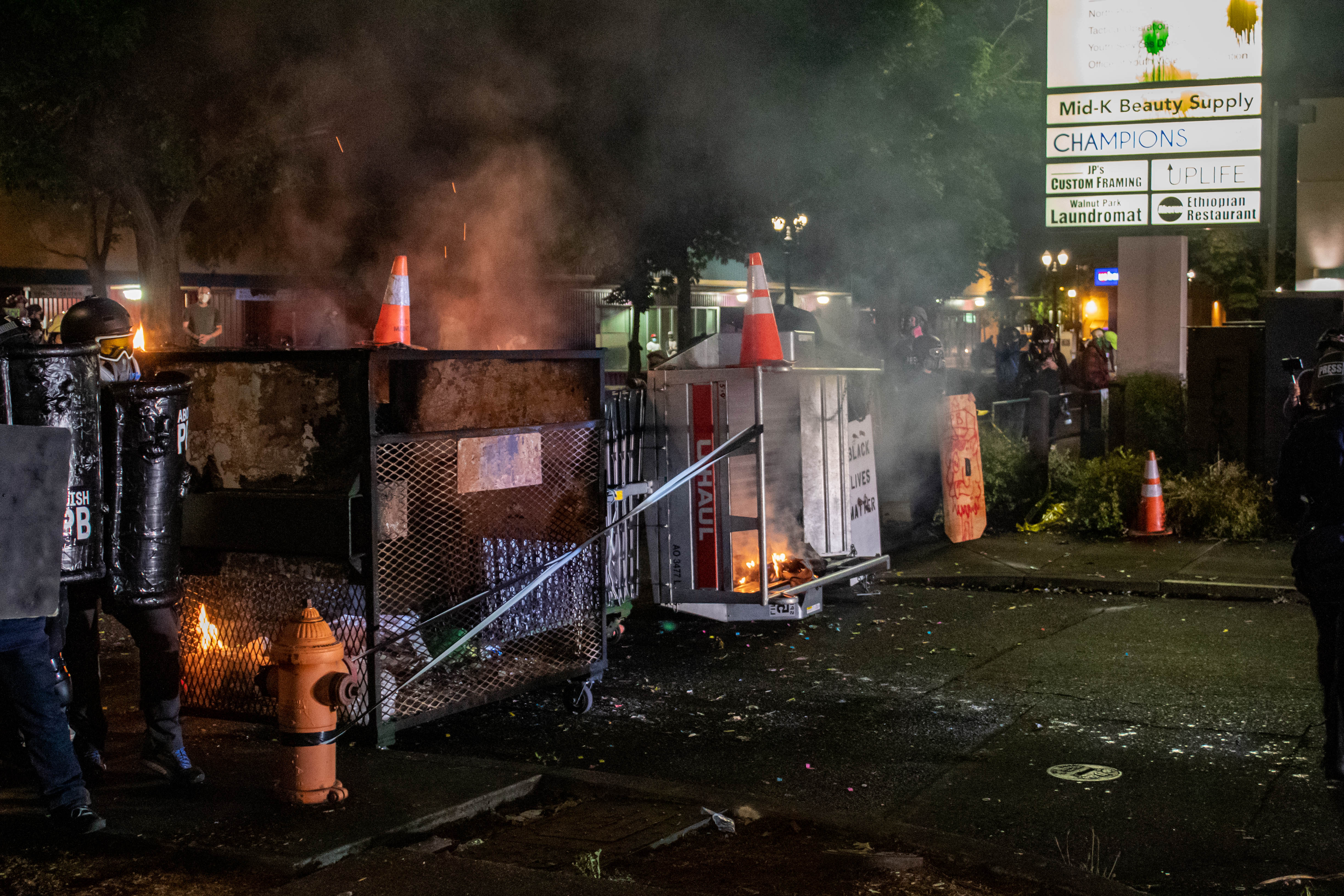
Black bloc protesters with shields and barricades during the Portland George Floyd protests, 2020

Black bloc protesters at the Delaney Hall protests using the traffic cone method to put out tear gas canisters, 2026

Hedges' characterization of black bloc was condemned by anarchist, OWS organizer, and Yale professor David Graeber, who published an open letter entitled Concerning the violent peace-police. Graeber claimed to have engaged in black bloc tactics and accused Hedges of spreading misinformation that can "get people killed," emphasizing that black bloc is a tactic rather than an ideology, that black bloc allows all protesters to more easily identify and avoid militant protesters if they wish, that "diversity of tactics" is not unique to black bloc, that black bloc protesters often engage in "Gandhian non-violence" or protect nonviolent protesters in acts of solidarity, that his language is dehumanizing, that his language reflects a broader tendency of "Peace Police" to confront or attack black blockers at protests which disrupts movement solidarity, and that police often attack black bloc protesters before anything illegal has been done which is never reported by the media as violence. Graeber then argued non-black blockers should be more like Mahatma Gandhi, whom Graeber believed would not condemn black bloc tactics because Gandhi believed "to oppose injustice through violent means is still morally superior to not doing anything to oppose injustice at all."

Truthout and Citizens Radio reporter JA Myerson then interviewed Hedges, saying "You speak of the black bloc as though it were a political organization with membership — a violent, secretive, nihilistic cabal, which calls to mind the Black Hand" and asking "were you aware writing this piece that that is not an apt description of a black bloc, which is no organization at all, but a protest tactic that does more than just smash and burn?" Hedges responded they are "spontaneous" by nature in order to provoke illegal acts. Myerson claimed he had seen black bloc tactics be used for reasons he considered justifiable, like rescuing protesters being arrested by police, confiscating kettle netting, and returning tear gas canisters to police. Hedges argued black bloc tactics make a movement more vulnerable to being destroyed by police and said violence is a "poison" and "tragic," which he argued proponents of black bloc tactics exacerbate. Hedges said in cases like the 2011 Egyptian revolution where 800 protesters were killed by the government, black bloc may be justified in response.

On the day of President Donald Trump's inauguration in 2017, black bloc groups were present among other protests in Washington, D.C., and other places. The groups engaged in vandalism, rioting, and violence. At least 217 were arrested and six police officers sustained minor injuries, and at least one other person was injured.

In February 2017, an event at the University of California, Berkeley by commentator Milo Yiannopoulos was cancelled by college administrators after protestors of a black bloc broke windows, shot fireworks, and caused a light fixture to catch fire. The cancellation of the event brought mainstream attention to anarchism and black bloc tactics.

In May 2021, Portland protesters in black bloc turned out at multiple rallies and marches that marked the one-year anniversary of the murder of George Floyd. At one event the protesters wheeled a dumpster into the street and set its contents on fire, drawing police out. The rally was declared a riot by police.

During the 2026 Delaney Hall protests, senior Slate writer Aymann Ismail accused black bloc protesters of arriving closer to the night time and saying they were "just there to fight police," in contrast with non-black blockers whom he praised. Many at the protesters were characterized as outside agitators.

=== Police infiltration ===
On occasion, police and security services have infiltrated black blocs, for purposes of investigation. Allegations first surfaced after several demonstrations. At the 2001 G8 summit in Genoa, among the many complaints about the police there was mention of video footage which "suggests that men in black were seen getting out of police vans near protest marches." In August 2007, Quebec police admitted that "their officers disguised themselves as demonstrators" in Montebello. However, the officers purportedly did not engage in violence, and claimed that they were carrying rocks because other protesters were doing so. They were identified by genuine protesters because of their police-issue footwear. According to veteran activist Harsha Walia, it was other participants in the black bloc who identified and exposed the undercover police. At the 2026 Delaney Hall hunger strike and protests, in collaboration with ICE agents, undercover Newark Police Division detectives infiltrated a crowd that had been using black bloc tactics to make a targeted arrest against a protester in the crowd.

== Tactics ==
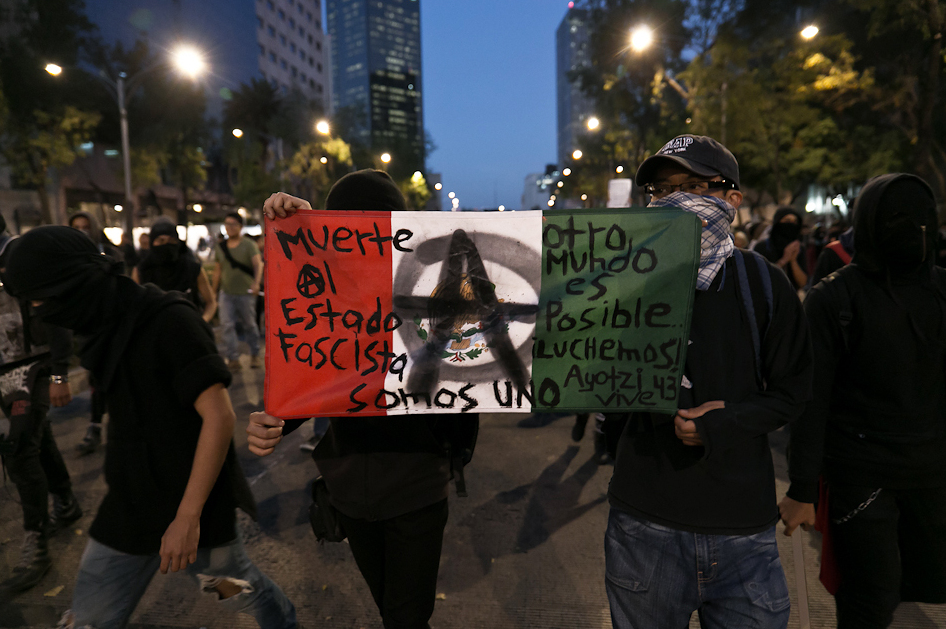
Black bloc in Mexico City organizing protests

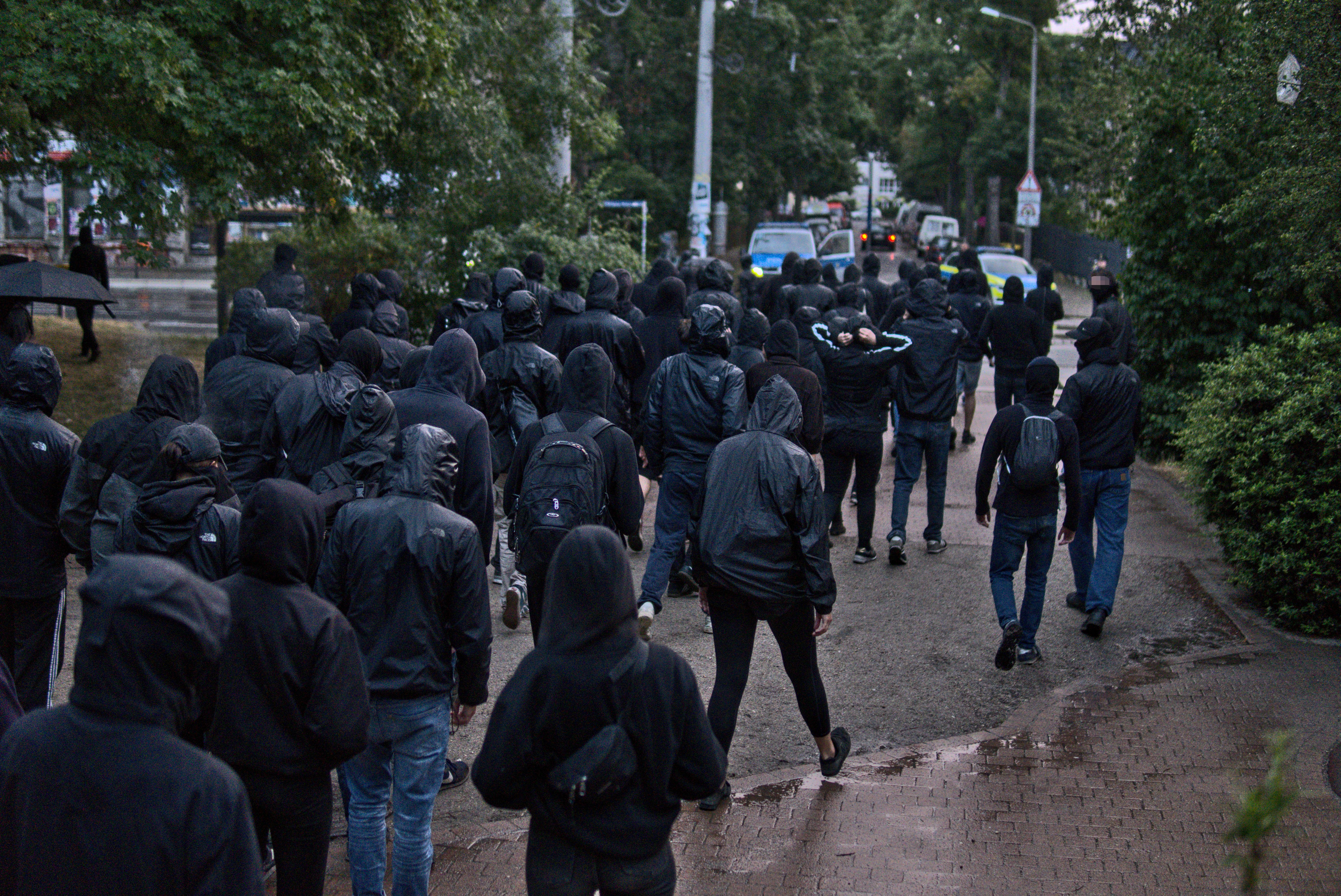
Anarchist black bloc organizing in Leipzig, Germany, in 2020

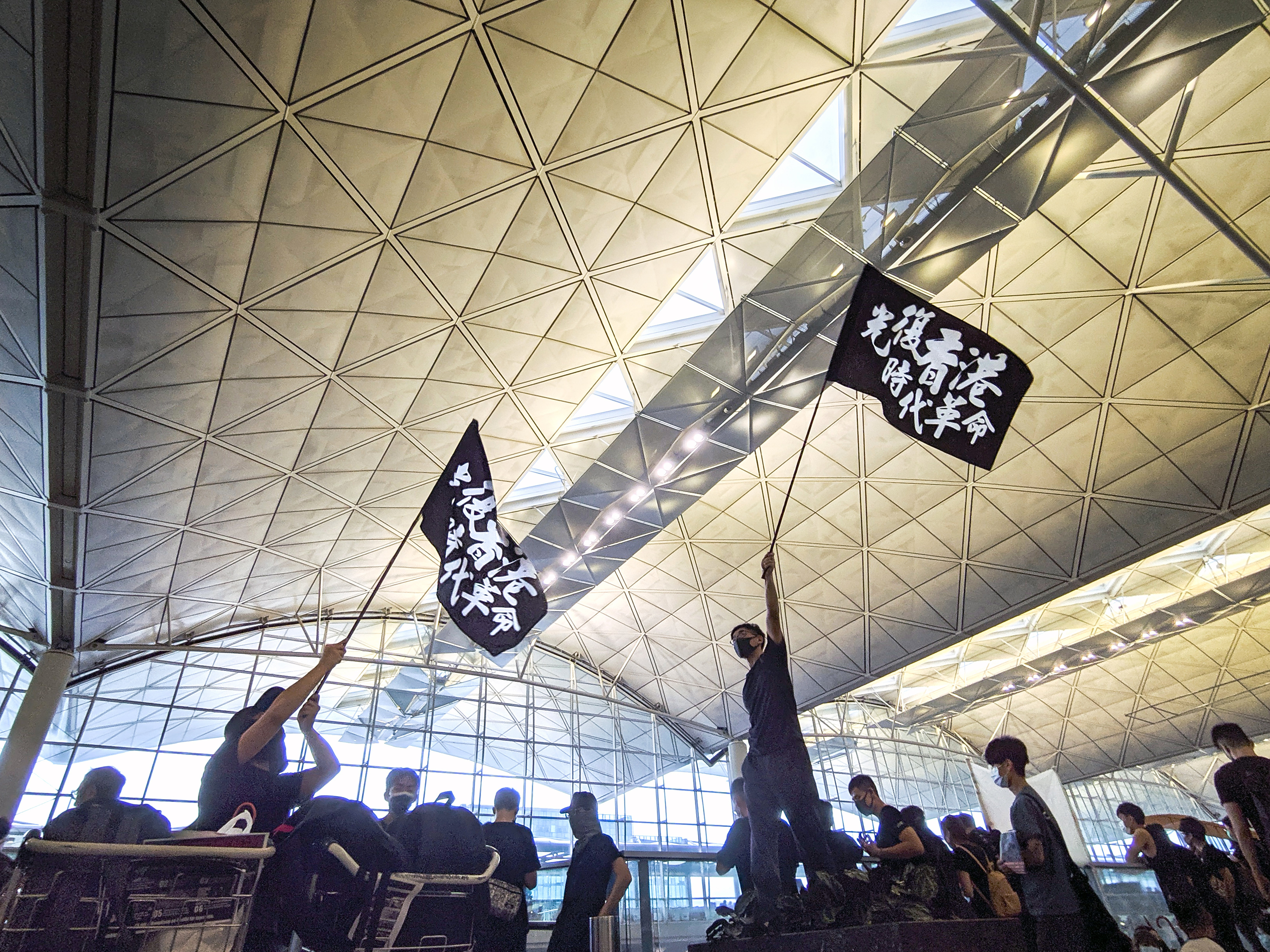
Hong Kong protesters using black bloc tactic during the Anti-Extradition Bill protests

When we smash a window, we aim to destroy the thin veneer of legitimacy that surrounds private property rights... After N30 [30 November], many people will never see a shop window or a hammer the same way again. The potential uses of an entire cityscape have increased a thousand-fold. The number of broken windows pales in comparison to the number of spells—spells cast by a corporate hegemony to lull us into forgetfulness of all the violence committed in the name of private property rights and of all the potential of a society without them. Broken windows can be boarded and eventually replaced, but the shattering of assumptions will hopefully persist for some time to come.

— ACME Collective, quoted in Paris (2003)

Tactics of a black bloc primarily include vandalism of private property, looting, rioting, and demonstrating without a permit. Tactics can also include use of defensive measures such as misleading the authorities, assisting in the escape of people arrested by the police ("un-arrests" or "de-arrests"), administering first aid to people affected by tear gas, rubber bullets, and other riot control measures in areas where protesters are barred from entering, building barricades, resisting the police, and practicing jail solidarity. Property destruction carried out by black blocs tends to have symbolic significance: common targets include banks, institutional buildings, outlets for multinational corporations, gasoline stations, and video-surveillance cameras.

There may be several blocs within a particular protest, with different aims and tactics. As an ad hoc group, blocs often share no universally common set of principles or beliefs apart from an adherence to—usually—leftist or autonomist values, although some anarchist groups have called for the Saint Paul Principles to be adapted as a framework in which diverse tactics can be deployed. A few radical right-wing groups, like some of the "autonomous nationalists" of Europe or the Australian so-called "National-Anarchists" have adopted "black bloc" tactics and dress. The political scientist Nicholas Apoifis, in his ethnography of anarchism in Athens, Greece, argues that black bloc action can constitute a form of prefigurative politics, due to its "flat and horizontal organisational structure, alongside its focus on solidarity."

== See also ==
- Anonymous (hacker group)
- Anti-Nazi League
- Antifa (Germany)
- Antifa (United States)
- Green Mountain Anarchist Collective
- Primera Línea
- Blackshirts
- Rebecca Riots
- Rock Against Racism
- Unite Against Fascism
