= WOMBLES =

Anarchist group

The WOMBLES (White Overalls Movement Building Libertarian Effective Struggles) were a loosely aligned anarchist and anti-capitalist group based in London. They gained prominence in the early 2000s for wearing white overalls with padding and helmets at May Day protests, mimicking the Italian group Tute Bianche.

== Beginnings ==
The WOMBLES formed as a group in the early 2000s in London. The name stood for White Overalls Movement Building Libertarian Effective Struggles. Activists who had witnessed first hand the tactics of the Tute Bianche in Italy decided to use similar methods of protest in London. Tute Bianche ('White Overalls') had formed in 1994 and were known for storming barricades whilst dressed in comical padded outfits and helmets to protect themselves from police violence, as for example at the 27th G8 summit in Genoa.

The preferred tactic of the London anarchist group was to steal an estate agents 'For Sale' sign, fold it up and wear it under the trademark white overalls. The WOMBLES were involved in protests during several May Day events in the early 2000s, including the protests in 2004 in Dublin.

== Social centres ==
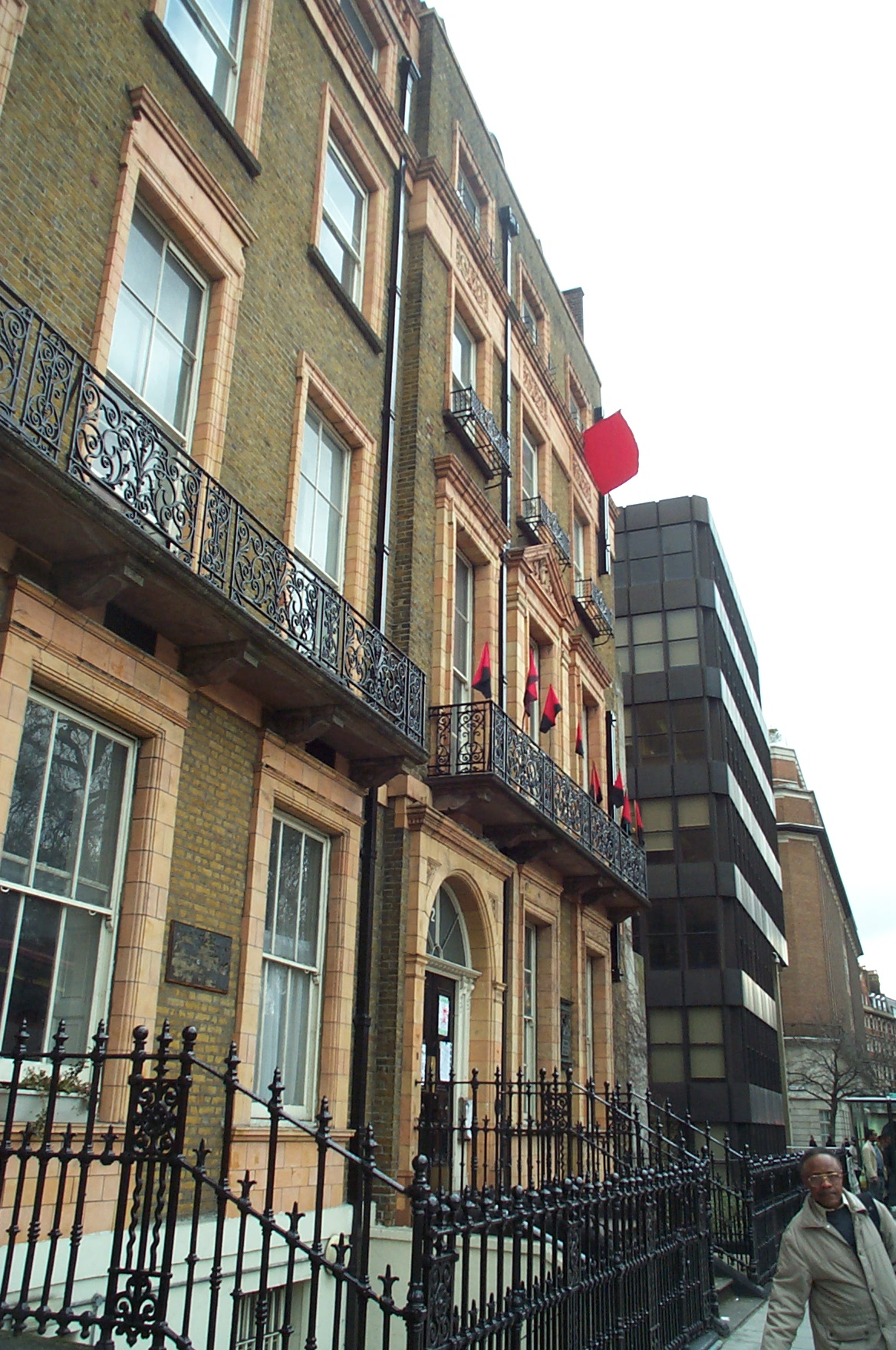
The Square social centre in 2006

The WOMBLES were also inspired by self-managed social centres in Italy and therefore began a series of social centres in London. Firstly, they squatted the Radical Dairy on Kynaston Road in Stoke Newington. This lasted from 2001 until 2003. The aim was to build long-term relationships with local people and to avoid capitalist property relations. From this centre, participants were then involved with other projects such as the Ex-Grand Banks, RampART, the Institute for Autonomy and The Square. The Button Factory squat in southeast London was evicted by police and partially demolished by the owner before the 2001 May Day demonstrations. The Ex-Grand Banks at 156-158 Fortess Road, in Tufnell Park, north London was opened on 4 March 2004. It became an activist hub before being evicted in August.

As well as organising in physical spaces, the WOMBLES used the internet to reach a wider audience, enabling solidarity networks.

The third European Social Forum (ESF) was held in London in 2004. The WOMBLES organised a countersummit held at Middlesex University called 'Beyond ESF' which provided a space for European radical social movements to meet and engage, focusing primarily on the issue of precarity.

== In the media ==
External audio
- Interview with a member of the WOMBLES

The WOMBLES quickly became a personification of the anti-capitalist and anti-globalisation movements for the mainstream media of the United Kingdom. The Evening Standard decided to 'infiltrate' the WOMBLES before the 2001, 2002 and 2003 Mayday protests in London. Individuals were identified as leaders and followed around by police and journalists at demonstrations.

Even after the WOMBLES had ceased to organise large scale demonstrations, the media continued to use their name as shorthand for a notorious group of anarchists. The WOMBLES were said to be organising against the G20 in 2009 according to the Mirror.

== In popular culture ==
The song Time for Heroes by the band Libertines reference the WOMBLES:

Did you see the stylish kids in the riot?

Shovelled up like muck

Set the night on fire

Wombles bleed truncheons and shields

You know I cherish you my love

== Police infiltration ==
Between 1999 and 2010, the WOMBLES were infiltrated by at least three British police officers, namely Mark Kennedy, Rod Richardson and Jaqueline Anderson. Kennedy later apologised for his actions, saying "I hate myself so much. I betrayed so many people. I owe it to a lot of good people to do something right for a change... I'm really sorry. If I can help in any way then I'd like to." Anderson was involved with the Radical Dairy and was known then as 'Massage Jacky' since she offered massage sessions. She told other activists she lived in a flat with Carlo Neri, who was also later exposed as a police spy.

== See also ==
- Anti-globalization
- Civil and social disobedience
- Disobbedienti
- London Action Resource Centre
- Ya Basta
- Zapatista Army of National Liberation
