= Enough Is Enough (letter) =

"Enough Is Enough" is a 100-page resignation letter written by Davison L. Budhoo, an economist from Grenada. Budhoo served as a senior economist at the International Monetary Fund (IMF) for 12 years until May 1988. His public resignation letter was sent to Michel Camdessus, the then managing directory of the IMF. The letter accused the IMF of extensive and systematic statistical fraud, which was then used to impose policies on developing countries. Budhoo claimed that the consequences of these policies led to massive poverty and starvation. The letter resulted in two studies commissioned by the government of Trinidad and Tobago (which had its credit rating hit due to the false statistics, forcing it to seek help from the IMF) that confirmed his accusations.

The letter was featured by Canadian author Naomi Klein her 2007 book, The Shock Doctrine,, and also by Swazi anthropologist Jason Hickel in his 2017 book The Divide.
