= Operation Dzikisai Madhishi =

Operation Dzikisai Madhishi (Shona, Pull down your satellite dish) was a 2008 operation of the Military of Zimbabwe to remove private homes' satellite dishes. These dishes are often used to view e.tv, SABC, Botswana Television, DSTV and other alternatives to the state-controlled Zimbabwe Broadcasting Corporation. It began in Matabeleland South in June 2008 and spread soon after to other provinces, carried out by attaches of the Central Intelligence Organisation, Zimbabwe Republic Police, Zimbabwe National Army and youth militia.

== See also ==
- Operation Murambatsvina
- Operation Mavhoterapapi
- Censorship
