= Sokwanele =

Sokwanele is a popular protest underground movement based in Zimbabwe that is involved in "anonymous acts of civil disobedience." They are pro-democracy, and they embrace supporters of all pro-democratic political parties, civic organisations and institutions. Sokwanele is committed to challenging and confronting – through non-violent activism – the way in which the ruling party, Zanu-PF, governs Zimbabwe. Sokwanele's message has reached millions of citizens in Zimbabwe through their protest graffiti. Sokwanele is not affiliated to the opposition Movement for Democratic Change (MDC) at all; in fact, the group's website very clear.

Sokwanele means 'enough is enough' in Ndebele; the Shona equivalent of the name is 'Zvakwana'.

Sokwanele communicates with its supporters primarily via a newsletter that people can subscribe to online. They also have a website, and they run a regularly updated blog entitled This is Zimbabwe. The government has imposed very tight restrictions on the media in Zimbabwe, and very few newspapers or radio stations that are critical of the government are permitted to operate. Sokwanele's communications provide a critical and impartial assessment of the government's actions, regularly reporting on corruption, human rights violations and bad governance.

Sokwanele closely monitored, in the 22 weeks leading up to the parliamentary elections on 31 March 2005, the government's compliance with the Southern African Development Community (SADC) protocol 'Principles and Guidelines Governing Democratic Elections'. The protocol was agreed by SADC leaders in Mauritius on 17 August 2004 and Zimbabwe was one of the signatories. Sokwanele circulated their weekly assessments through a special newsletter entitled 'Mauritius Watch'. Their final report based on the mounting evidence of non-compliance concluded that the elections were deeply flawed and did not satisfy the SADC principles and guidelines, and therefore could not possibly be considered 'free and fair'. They reached this conclusion before the elections took place.

On polling day itself, Sokwanele blogged regular updates from activists on the ground who alerted them to unscrupulous government activities which included refusing access to polling agents from the main opposition party, imprisoning MDC agents, incommunicado, after the vote; and controlling all forms of communication to and from the polling stations. They also reported on the difficulty that some voters had in trying to vote, and reports from voters of the presence of dead relatives on the voter's roll. On the basis of this evidence, after the voting was over, Sokwanele went on to produce a report that detailed the hour by hour events on polling day into how they allege the government comprehensively rigged the elections.

More recently, Sokwanele has written several articles critical of the government's 'Operation Murambatsvina (Operation Drive Out Trash).' Using Flickr, Sokwanele has also compiled a set of photographs depicting the impact of Operation Murambatsvina on ordinary Zimbabwean civilians.
