= Tute Bianche =

Italian militant social movement (1994–2001)

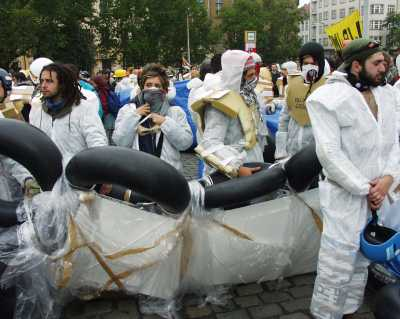
Members of the "Tute Bianche" in 2006.

Tute Bianche (lit. 'White Overalls') was a militant Italian social movement active from 1994 to 2001. Activists were notable for covering their bodies with white padding so as to resist the blows of police, pushing through police lines, and marching together in large blocks for mutual protection during political demonstrations.

== Name ==
The name stems from an early demonstration (initiated by a loose group of Italian anti-globalization activists called the Ya Basta Association), involving the group defense of a squatted social center (Italian: centro sociale autogestito, CSO or CSOA, meaning "occupied social centre"), in which demonstrators wore white overalls to evoke the ghosts that would haunt the ghost town police proposed to make of the social center. The padding tactic, adopted later, is also referred to as a padded bloc tactic. It was first used in September 2000 by other activists during the anti-globalization protests in Prague. About the movement's name and colour, the Milan collective of the Ya Basta Association explained: "If the struggle aims at achieving visibility, the colour of the fight is white, and the white garment covers the whole body."

== Activity ==
Central to the Tute Bianche movement was the Italian Ya Basta Association, a network of groups throughout Italy that were inspired by the Zapatista Army of National Liberation (EZLN) uprising in Chiapas in 1994. Ya Basta primarily originated in the autonomist social centres of Milan, particularly Centro Sociale Leoncavallo. These social centres grew out of the Italian autonomist movement of the 1970 and 1980s. The Tute Bianche philosophy was based on a specific reading of Italian political/social history, including the idea that the traditional protest tactic of marching and "bearing witness" to power had outlived its usefulness, and a more confrontational militant form of non-violent protest was required to not only re-invigorate the anti-globalization movement but also to redefine how street resistance is understood. The Tute Bianche movement reached its apex in July 2001 during the protests at the 27th G8 summit, with a turn-out of an estimated 10,000 protesters in a single "padded block", after a collective decision to go without the white overalls. Shortly after the anti-G8 Genoa protests, the Ya Basta Association disbanded, with certain segments reforming into the Disobbedienti (Disobedients). This philosophy includes the occupation and creation of squatted self-managed social centres, anti-sexist activism, support for immigrant rights and refugees seeking political asylum, as well as the process of walking together in large formations during demonstrations held in the streets, by force if necessary in case of clashes with police. The Tute Bianche have had international variations of one sort or another. For instance, Mono Blanco was the preferred identifier in Spain. The first North American variant of the Tute Bianche, the NYC Ya Basta Collective wore yellow overalls rather than white. A British group calling itself the WOMBLES (White Overalls Movement Building Libertarian Effective Struggles) adopted the Tute Bianche's tactics.

== See also ==
- Anti-globalization movement
- Self-managed social centres in Italy
