= Zvakwana =

Zvakwana is an underground movement in Zimbabwe, that came to light in 2004. Its name means "enough is enough" in the Shona language, and in Ndebele it translates to Sokwanele. (Sokwanele is also a part of the movement but appears to be more occupied with information dissemination).

Zvakwana appears to be responsible for clandestinely distributing resistance messages, graffiti, CDs of music, and condoms featuring their logo, a Z on a yellow background. They also run a website which the Zimbabwean government is trying to block from internet service providers.

Opposition party, Movement for Democratic Change, says they have no connection to Zvakwana, but share its values and support its efforts.
