= Jail solidarity =

Jail solidarity is unity of purpose of those incarcerated or imprisoned. In some mass arrest situations, the activists decide to use solidarity tactics to secure the same plea bargain for everyone. Sometimes activists also make a mutual decision to reject offered plea bargains and take their cases to trial in order to overburden the court system, or in order to otherwise mutually support one another as co-defendants; an example of this would be the Camden 28. It is generally agreed that jail solidarity works best when a plan is arranged ahead of time. One of the governing principles of the anti-nuclear movement in the United States was jail solidarity. Some activists have viewed jail solidarity as being very important for their states of mind while imprisoned.

Jail solidarity can also refer to non-prisoners holding rallies outside prisons or otherwise helping to provide moral support to prisoners, especially imprisoned activists or colleagues. It has been hypothesized that prison administrations throughout the United States might be overwhelmed by prisoner organizing across racial lines. Per Herngren, recounting his prison experience, writes:

Patrick O'Neill had broken a conditional sentence that he had had from a previous action. His bail was set at ten thousand dollars. As soon as the judge reduced the bail for me, representatives of the court came to my cell. They wanted me to sign a paper that promised that I would appear at the trial. I refused because they would not release Patrick. Some people thought it was strange that I voluntarily remained in jail. But prison solidarity increases the moral pressure on the authorities. After two months they removed Patrick's bail requirement and we could leave the jail together.

A number of prisoner advocacy organizations, including PrisonerSolidarity.org, which serves as a news portal, are part of the prisoner solidarity movement.

Jail solidarity actions can also include the implementation of accountability mechanisms that seek to track, document, and expose human violations in carceral institutions in order to relay them to authorities for and demand improvements within jail and prison walls. An example of one such initiative is the creation of the Jail Accountability and Information Line (JAIL), a hotline launched by Carleton University’s Criminalization and Punishment Education Project (CPEP) in December 2018 with the purpose of holding accountable the Ottawa-Carleton Detention Centre (OCDC) and Ontario Ministry of the Solicitor General staff for the mistreatment of those imprisoned within OCDC walls, as well inform jailed callers of their rights and available community reintegration resources.

Another form of jail solidarity action lies in the bridging of gaps between the imprisoned and their families, tackling the issues which prevent the incarcerated from maintaining ties with their loved ones. In 1970, the Black Panther Party initiated the Free Busing to Prisons Program in Southern California, renting busses, cars, and vans as a means of providing free weekly transportation to county jails, state penitentiaries, and other institutions. The Black Panther Party also implemented the Free Commissary for Prisoners Program that sought to provide inmates with toiletries, shoes, cosmetics and clothing free of charge through donations collected from the public and small businesses.
