= Operation Mavhoterapapi =

Zimbabwean government campaign

Operation Mavhoterapapi (English: Operation Where You Put Your X or Who Did You Vote For), was a large-scale Zimbabwean government campaign to punish those who supposedly voted for the Movement for Democratic Change (MDC) in the 2008 presidential election and intimidate them into supporting Robert Mugabe's ruling party, the Zimbabwe African National Union – Patriotic Front (ZANU-PF), in the subsequent runoff election.

== Background ==
Following the end of the Rhodesian Civil War and the negotiated transition to Zimbabwean independence, Robert Mugabe was elected prime minister in the 1980 Southern Rhodesian general election. Mugabe quickly consolidated power, granting himself the ability to serve as president with no term limits. Mugabe ushered in a wave of political violence, directing the military to attack Matabeleland civilians who primarily supported ZAPU, his political rivals, in a four-year campaign of murder, torture, and rape called the Gukurahundi. An estimated 20,000 civilians were killed. Until 2008, Mugabe won each subsequent Zimbabwean election in polls that were marred by government threats and violence.

== 2008 election ==
In 2008, for the first time since Zimbabwean independence, Mugabe did not receive the most votes in an election. Morgan Tsvangirai of the Movement for Democratic Change (MDC) emerged from the first round of voting in first place, triggering a runoff election between Tsvangirai and Mugabe.

=== Operation ===
Following his defeat in the first round of voting, Mugabe launched Operation Mavhoterapapi, a campaign of violence with the aim of intimidating civilians into voting for him in the runoff election. Dozens were killed and thousands were injured; some people were physically removed from their homes and forced to attend government loyalty sessions. About 200,000 people were displaced, and hundreds were tortured. Government forces allegedly inflicted torture by beating with chains, scalding with burning plastic, or tying up and burning civilians.

Five days before the second round of voting, Tsvangirai withdrew from the election. He cited the violence as his reason for withdrawal; with no opponent remaining, Mugabe easily won reelection. Violence continued after the election, as non-voters, identified by a lack of election ink on their fingers, were beaten.

== See also ==
- Operation Dzikisai Madhishi
