= Ya Basta Association =

Italian activist network founded in 1994

The Ya Basta Association is a network of Italian anti-capitalist and pro-immigrants rights organizations and groups, fueled by the Italian social center movement, formed in 1994, and known for the "authorship" of the Tute Bianche, and later disobbedienti phenomena.

Formed as a result of the "eros effect" of the Zapatista Army of National Liberation uprising in Chiapas in 1994, the Ya Basta Association is sometimes confused with its corresponding tactical project, the Tute Bianche. However these two projects are distinct in that while the Ya Basta Association is an overarching project involving many facets, including the utilization of the "white overall" tactic, the Tute Bianche was a broader tactic involving, at the time of Genoa 2001, many participants unconnected with the Italian Association.

== See also ==
- ¡Ya basta!
