= ¡Ya basta! =

Spanish motto

¡Ya basta! is a phrase in Spanish roughly approximate to "Enough is enough!" or "Enough already!" in US English. It has been adopted by several Latin American insurgent groups as an expression of affront towards issues that sparked the original dissent. Its adoption by the EZLN in Mexico as the movement's motto is exemplary of its popularity and ability to rally diverse ideologies under a common goal.

== Linguistics and etymology ==
Grammatically, there is little difference between ¡Basta ya! and ¡Ya basta!, and both are correct. The phrase, or its Italian equivalent, may be the source of the English nautical word "Avast", which means "Stop, cease or desist from whatever is being done".

== Examples of usage ==
According to Thomas Oleson, there is a different website from the Ya Basta! Italian solidarity group. Ya Basta, which Justin Paulson launched in March 1994, was one of the first websites to feature EZLN content.

"Ya Basta Association" was the name of a major anti-capitalist activist network of groups in Italy which played a central role in the Anti-G8 protest in 2001. They are known for their adoption of sophisticated direct action tactics and for making suits of armor out of street garbage and recycled materials. Ya Basta Association is sometimes associated with the "White Overalls" who appear in many protests heavily padded.

Another movement with a similar name is Spanish ¡Basta Ya!, an organization opposing the former Basque separatist organization ETA, which carried out attacks in the Basque Country to demand its independence from Spain and France.

Rapper M-1 of the group Dead Prez endorsed the use of the phrase and the accompanying hand sign in the film Dave Chappelle's Block Party. The phrase is the name of a French record label, and has been used as the title of works by various musicians, including Sonic Boom Six, GrimSkunk, Elida Reyna, and Ultra-red.
