= Controversies involving ICE and private businesses =

Multiple private businesses have facilitated or allegedly facilitated deportation efforts of United States Immigration and Customs Enforcement (ICE) and federal immigration officials, especially during the second presidency of Donald Trump, which has resulted in lawsuits, protests, and scrutiny from advocacy groups. Private prison companies have been accused of keeping detainees in poor living conditions. Many Big Tech companies have aired ICE ads, and AI-based companies have created surveillance software to help track protester anti-ICE networks and potential locations of immigrants.

== Background ==
Donald Trump was inaugurated for his second term as President of the United States on January 20, 2025, with one of his key campaign promises being to crack down on immigration. That evening, Trump signed several executive orders related to immigration, including declaring a national emergency at the Mexico–United States border, blocking asylum seekers from entering the U.S., expanding the detention of apprehended migrants pending removal proceedings, ending birthright citizenship for new children born to parents who are not U.S. permanent residents, suspending almost all refugee admissions to the U.S., and officially designating certain international cartels and criminal organizations as terrorists. Trump signed the Laken Riley Act on January 29, 2025, which mandates the detention of immigrants who are arrested, charged with, or convicted of certain crimes.

Border encounters between migrants and U.S. Customs and Border Protection (CBP) continued to decline since Trump took office in 2025; refugee admissions have also plummeted. The administration has also expanded its immigration detention and deportation operations. The overall strategy of the Trump administration, and the often maximalist tactics employed, primarily by the U.S. Department of Homeland Security, have received widespread criticism, and protests have erupted across the country in response.

In 2025, Congress passed and President Donald Trump signed the One Big Beautiful Bill Act which appropriated $170 billion to immigration enforcement through 2029. In 2026, Congress passed and President Trump signed the Secure America Act which appropriated, through 2029, an additional $69.5 billion dollars.

== List ==
Company	Overview	In-depth summary
CBS News	Pulled documentary about immigrant detention facility CECOT from the air; accused of doing so due to pressure from the Trump administration	"Inside CECOT" is a segment that was originally intended to be broadcast on the December 21, 2025, episode of 60 Minutes, a television news magazine from CBS News. Presented by correspondent Sharyn Alfonsi, the segment discusses the experiences of detainees at the Terrorism Confinement Center (CECOT), a maximum security prison in El Salvador used to confine Venezuelan migrants who had been deported from the US by the Trump administration in early 2025. The segment, which contains interviews with former detainees and photographic evidence detailing systematic torture at the facility, independently corroborates earlier conclusions made by Human Rights Watch. Reports by former detainees and journalists have described "El Salvador's CECOT" as a "living nightmare" and "hellscape" due to the extremely harsh conditions and high-tech surveillance present in the facility. Three hours prior to broadcast, CBS News announced that the segment had been pulled and would be broadcast at a later date; Alfonsi accused CBS News's new editor-in-chief Bari Weiss of spiking the story for political reasons. Weiss claimed that the story "was not ready" for broadcast; sources within CBS News told outlets including The New York Times that two days before the anticipated broadcast, Weiss had asked the producers to arrange an interview with Trump administration operative Stephen Miller, who designed the deportation policy, or an administration operative of similar rank. Alfonsi stated in an email memorandum to colleagues that the production team did request comments and interviews from White House officials, the State Department, and the Department of Homeland Security (which were all refused), and that the segment was reviewed five times and approved by the CBS legal department and Standards and Practices division. On December 22, 2025, a cut of the episode that still contained the "Inside CECOT" story was accidentally made available online by Canadian broadcaster Global, causing the segment to be widely disseminated. The segment was shared en masse by activists, causing it to quickly spread across the internet; most iterations of it were removed after CBS began issuing takedown orders via the Digital Millennium Copyright Act, though it remains on archival sites and several irregular distribution platforms. Weiss met with major backlash from numerous journalists, progressive groups, and public officials, who deemed the cancellation unjustified, and to have been carried out at the behest of the Trump administration. The segment eventually aired in an updated form on the January 18, 2026, episode of 60 Minutes; while the body of the report was unchanged, it was updated to include a new intro and outro by Alfonsi with statements from White House and DHS officials, as well as acknowledgements of the United States' subsequent intervention in Venezuela and capture of president Nicolás Maduro in January 2026.
Cellebrite	$11 million contract with ICE providing them with spyware that enables hacking into phones and retrieving all data including encrypted messaging apps.	In September 2025, the Department of Homeland Security renewed an $11 million contract with Cellebrite for software which can unlock phones and take complete images of all data on the phone including apps, location, history, photos, notes, call records, text messages, WhatsApp messages, and encrypted messaging app data including Signal. The app has primarily been used by Immigration and Customs Enforcement agents, but has also been used by Customs and Border Protection, Secret Service, and Transportation Security Administration agents.
Citizens Financial Group	Funding of GEO Group and CoreCivic immigration detention centers	Citizens Bank has faced criticism and protests for funding private, for-profit detention centers used by Immigration and Customs Enforcement (ICE). As of June 2025, nearly 90% of the people held by ICE are in facilities run by private, for-profit companies. The largest companies are Geo Group and CoreCivic, which have borrowed $550 million and $500 million, respectively, from Citizens Bank according to filings with the SEC. In January 2026, activists in Connecticut, Massachusetts, New York, Pennsylvania, Rhode Island, and New York picketed two dozen Citizen Bank branches, appealing for customers to stop banking with Citizens Bank. In early February 2026, protests were held at an Alexandria, Virginia bank branch. Dozens of groups also planned similar events at local Citizens Bank branches in 11 states and Washington, DC to be held on March 7, 2026. On July 16, 2026, shortly after the 2026 Delaney Hall hunger strike and protests, a spokesperson for Jersey City mayor James Solomon announced the city was pulling funds from Citizens Bank over its financial support for GEO Group and CoreCivic. The spokesperson said "Citizens Bank made a choice to finance the caging of human beings for profit. Jersey City is making a choice too: we will not be complicit." On July 17, Citizens bank announced it will stop helping GEO Group and CoreCivic get financing, not because of policy issues, but because the firms no longer need their help.
Clearview AI	$9.2 million contract for facial recognition technology using database with over 50 billion faces	In September 2025, Clearview signed a $10 million dollar contract in 2025, making it their largest American federal contract to date, the second being one signed in 2021 for $2.3 million for United States Immigration and Customs Enforcement (ICE) agents to use. The Department of Homeland Security claimed they will only use the app to identify child predators and to investigate assaults against law enforcement officers, and in 2026, at least eight people have been wrongfully arrested so far due to false positives from the app. They have also provided services to Customs and Border Protection (CBP).
CoreCivic	Private prison company that kept detained foreign nationals in their prisons under contract with ICE; an employee helped characterize a makeup artist as a gang member; was targeted by a class action lawsuit for poor prison conditions	Seven immigrants sued ICE and DHS in November 2025, alleging inhumane conditions at CoreCivic's California City Detention Facility in the remote Mojave Desert. Represented by the Prison Law Office and the ACLU, detainees reported freezing cells infested with insects, lack of medical care, shower stalls full of sewage, and limited access to lawyers. The lawsuit came on the heels of a detainee hunger strike following the center's re-opening without proper permits. A spokesman for CoreCivic's 2,500-bed facility said "the safety, health and well-being of the individuals entrusted to our care is our top priority. " The facility was a former state prison that had been closed in March 2024. The T. Don Hutto Residential Center (formerly known as T. Don Hutto Family Residential Facility, and the T. Don Hutto Family Detention Facility) is a guarded, fenced-in, multi-purpose center currently used to detain foreign nationals awaiting the outcome of their immigration status. The center is located at 1001 Welch Street in the city of Taylor, Texas, within Williamson County. Formerly a medium-security state prison, it is operated by CoreCivic under contract with the U.S. Immigration and Customs Enforcement agency (known as ICE) through an ICE Intergovernmental Service Agreement (IGSA) with Williamson County, Texas. In 2006, Hutto became an immigrant-detention facility detaining immigrant families. The facility was turned into a women's detention center in 2009. In 2025, a CoreCivic employee, Charles Cross Jr., played an instrumental role in characterizing a gay Venezuelan makeup artist as a member of the Tren de Aragua gang, which the Trump administration used as justification to deport the Venezuelan man to El Salvador's Terrorism Confinement Center. Cross was fired from the Milwaukee Police Department in 2016 for driving a car into a family's home while drunk. CoreCivic hired him four months later.
Flock Safety	Surveillance cameras were used by immigration enforcement agents	Main article: Flock Safety In May 2025, it was reported by 404 Media that Flock data had been queried for use in immigration enforcement. According to the company, a pilot program of investigation with Customs and Border Protection and Homeland Security Investigations was initiated to help combat human trafficking and fentanyl distribution. Flock halted the program in August because of "confusion and concerns" about the purpose of the investigations. In August 2025, 19 Flock Safety cameras in Evanston, Illinois, were deactivated and slated for termination after a conclusion that Flock violated state privacy laws regarding the sharing of Illinois data with federal immigration agents. By early September, most of cameras were removed, but were reportedly reinstalled again in locations near to the original ones, despite an absence of authorization from the city.
GEO Group	Private prison company that kept detained foreign nationals under contract with ICE; criticized for poor prison conditions	In 2025, Rümeysa Öztürk, a Tufts University PhD student, was held at the South Louisiana ICE Processing Center (SLIPC), a GEO detention center in Basile, Louisiana. In court filings, she alleged that it took 20–60 minutes for a nurse to arrive when she was having asthma attacks. She also noted there were not enough language interpreters. In general, she stated, the prison conditions are "depriving us of basic human needs". In September 2025, human rights organizations including the American Civil Liberties Union of Louisiana filed complaints on behalf of four trans individuals detained at SLIPC under the Federal Tort Claims Act and submitted a civil rights complaint to U.S. Department of Homeland Security oversight bodies alleging sexual harassment, medical neglect, coerced labor, retaliation and other abuses from GEO staff dating from 2023. GEO denied the allegations. Main article: Delaney Hall oversight incident On May 9, 2025, a confrontation and subsequent skirmish between law enforcement and four Democratic politicians occurred at Delaney Hall, an immigration detention center in Newark, New Jersey, United States. Ras Baraka, the mayor of Newark, was arrested and charged with trespassing, but the charges were later dropped. LaMonica McIver, one of the three U.S. representatives from New Jersey involved, was later charged with three counts of assaulting or interfering with a federal officer. McIver rejected the charges as an attempt at political intimidation. Main article: Delaney Hall hunger strike and protests Riot police outside Delaney Hall shortly before making mass arrests, May 31, 2026 On May 22, 2026, in Newark, New Jersey, immigrants detained in Delaney Hall, a private prison run by GEO Group used for holding immigrants detained by Immigration and Customs Enforcement (ICE), held a month-long hunger and labor strike protesting conditions inside the facility. Detainees have been given expired food with worms or mold, sleep on the floor in overcrowded rooms, have been denied medical care for serious conditions, and have reportedly been abused by guards. Protests supporting the strikers escalated outside the facility with over 90 arrests. Conditions inside the facility worsened, with reports of batons, pepper spray, and tear gas being used against strikers and multiple ambulances arriving at the facility throughout the strike. The strikes ended due to actions taken by guards to intimidate, segregate, and discipline strikers, such as by putting strike leaders in solitary confinement, threatening to force-feed strikers, and transporting strikers to unknown facilities around the country. Some protesters blocked ICE vehicles from entering or exiting the facility. ICE agents attacked protesters and journalists with batons, pepper spray, and tasers. Local officials including Governor Mikie Sherrill were denied access to the facility, and Senator Andy Kim was pepper sprayed by ICE while trying to de-escalate. Governor Sherrill ordered the New Jersey State Police (NJSP) to take over operations outside the facility for ICE, and she also established "protest zones" for protesters to move inside, while Newark mayor Ras Baraka established an overnight curfew surrounding Delaney Hall. Riot police were then repeatedly deployed and used batons, pepper spray, tear gas, flash grenades, rubber bullets, horseback police, SWAT teams, armored vehicles, and undercover police to disperse, kettle, arrest, and criminally charge protesters who refused to leave, with many journalists being injured or arrested. The Department of Homeland Security (DHS) has characterized protesters as agitators and rioters, saying "There is NO hunger strike at Delaney Hall. There are NO subprime conditions or abuse at the facility." Governor Sherrill accused some protesters of being from "national extremist groups" without naming specific groups, and Mayor Baraka has criticized both protesters and police, saying the police's actions were "in some cases, unconstitutional." Municipal, state, and federal actions have sparked significant backlash from advocacy groups and the political left. On Sunday June 21, protesters held a Father's Day vigil, and tied neckties to the fence outside the facility to honor fathers who remained detained. Some protesters holding up signs saying "Free the dads." During the vigil, one female protester was struck by a red Dodge Challenger from behind at around 1:52pm as it drove into the facility. According to The Jersey Vindicator, "Onlookers gasped and screamed as the car struck James near the waist, sending the American flag flying and dragging her several yards across the pavement." According to protesters, protests then escalated, with some demonstrators throwing plastic bottles and yelling, prompting federal agents to deploy pepper balls and pepper spray. DHS disputed this account, accusing activists of rioting prior to when the protester was hit by the vehicle. The protester was taken to University Hospital in Newark with non-life-threatening injuries. An investigation by the Newark Police Division (NPD) ensued. The protester announced intent to sue GEO Group and ICE. A DHS spokesperson stated that the vehicle "was not being driven by an ICE employee," and the Newark Public Safety director confirmed that the person driving the car was an employee at GEO Group named Thomas Brown, who is being charged with assault.
Global Crossing Airlines	Ran deportation flights for ICE, leading to resignations, cyberattacks, and concerns for passenger safety	GlobalX began operating deportation flights in 2024, and has handled more than half of deportation flights in 2024 and 2025. It operates many transfer flights of migrants within the United States, and immigration lawyers say these transfer flights have made it difficult to track their clients. In January 2025, a flight operated by GlobalX transporting shackled deported migrants from the United States to Brazil experienced repeated technical problems, including struggles to take off, broken air conditioning, and an unscheduled landing due to technical issues. During the flight, multiple people fainted from heat exhaustion. The conditions on the flight led to diplomatic tensions between the United States and Brazil, with Brazilian government ministers describing the handling of the deportees on the flight as "unacceptable" and "degrading". GlobalX handled several controversial flights in March 2025. On March 15, three GlobalX flights, aircraft tail numbers N278GX, N837VA, and N630VA, were used to transport Venezuelan nationals being held at El Valle Detention Center in Raymondville, Texas. The deportation flights traveled from Harlingen, Texas, to Honduras, where the plane sat on the tarmac for three hours before taking off again for El Salvador. There, the prisoners were transferred to Salvadoran custody and imprisonment. On March 20, GlobalX operated a flight to bring hundreds of Venezuelans to El Salvador, despite a federal judge blocking the flight. An investigative article by ProPublica, published April 1, 2025, reported concerns for passenger safety by flight attendants on GlobalX detainee flights chartered by Immigration Customs and Enforcement (ICE). The attendants were concerned about how they would be able to evacuate aircraft in the event of an emergency given that the passengers were handcuffed and shackled. On April 16, GlobalX's executive chairman, Chris Jamroz, resigned from the board of directors of the Royal Ontario Museum after his links to the deportation flights were reported on by Canadian independent journalist Rachel Gilmore. On May 5, 404 Media reported that the airline's computer systems had been hacked and its website defaced by the hacker group Anonymous. The individuals claiming to be the hackers provided 404 Media with flight records and passenger manifests from January 19 through May 1, 2025, and 404 Media reported that the data matched other publicly-available records. The hackers claimed that they accessed an Amazon Web Services account belonging to the airline, with 404 Media reporting that "The hacker told 404 Media they managed to find a token belonging to a GlobalX developer. They then used that to find access and secret keys for GlobalX's AWS instances which contained the data." GlobalX later filed a report with the SEC confirming the attack, though it did not confirm or deny the claim that data was leaked.
Hilton Worldwide	Hilton Worldwide shut down a hotel that refused service to ICE agents; protesters in NYC occupied a Hilton hotel lobby and 50-70 were arrested	In January 2026, Hilton withdrew franchise status from a Minneapolis franchisee that sought to prevent United States Immigration and Customs Enforcement (ICE) from staying in their hotel, sparking controversy and allegations of complicity. Financial advice expert Ramit Sethi organized a boycott of Hilton properties and asked his fans to cancel their reservations. Minnesota residents also protested several times late at night where a large number of ICE agents were reportedly staying, playing drums and making noise to disrupt sleeping agents inside. Similarly, civil rights attorneys organized a campaign to have Hilton Honors members cancel their accounts in protest of Hilton, accusing the company of being complicit in ICE's actions. NYPD Strategic Response Group blocks protesters outside while police escort arrestees from TriBeCa hotel to jail truck On January 27, 2026, three days after the killing of Alex Pretti, dozens of protesters in New York City occupied the lobby of a Tribeca Hilton hotel. Protesters alleged federal immigration agents had previously lodged there. More than 100 protesters entered the hotel on Sixth Avenue near Canal Street at about 6pm wearing black T-shirts with anti-ICE slogans. Protesters from a separate anti-ICE rally gathered outside to show support and police surveillance drones circled overhead. At 6:35pm, officers entered the lobby and warned protesters to leave or face arrest. Many protesters left, and reporters were forced to leave the lobby. About 50 to 70 protesters remained and at 7:30pm, the Strategic Response Group (SRG) began making arrests, lifting protesters off the floor, zip tying their hands, and bringing them to a jail bus. Protests remained outside during and after the arrests. They chanted "Which Side Are You On?" Others held signs and banners saying "Abolish ICE" and "ICE out of New York," or banners with pictures of people who were killed by federal immigration agents. One organizer for the protest said "they're [not just] taking people off the streets [...] but killing them blatantly in broad daylight with no due process." A former Minneapolis resident in the crowd said "this feels different. This feels on the precipice of it being a lot more scary." Mayor Zohran Mamdani praised the protesters for peacefully exercising their rights and the police for their presence through a spokesman.
Home Depot	Accused by protesters of not doing enough to prevent ICE arrests of illegal immigrant employees at their stores	Anti-ICE protest stops outside Home Depot, New York City, January 2026 Home Depot has had a decades-long track record as a gathering place for workers who are undocumented immigrants, many who work as roofers, painters, or construction workers. In May 2025, top White House official Stephen Miller directed ICE to target Home Depot day laborers to find undocumented immigrants to deport. The Washington Post reported that "ICE agents appeared to follow Miller's tip and conducted an immigration sweep Friday at the Home Depot in the predominantly Latino neighborhood of Westlake in Los Angeles." One man going to a Home Depot in Westlake noticed the men who regularly gather outside looking for work were missing. Earlier that day, a moving van containing a group of federal agents wearing border patrol vests pulled up to a Home Depot, at which point the back door opened and the agents "ran into the parking lot" and detained 16 people. One undocumented day laborer told CNN, "Right now, I'm behind on my rent because I'm scared of getting detained at the corner of Home Depot or having an encounter with ICE." On Reddit, some Home Depot workers shared stories about how raids had caused fewer contractors to visit stores, whereas others said nothing had changed. In a social media post, Home Depot downplayed the incidents, claiming that employees were told to report incidents and avoid interactions with immigration agents, and referring to a mandate to follow "all federal and local rules and regulations." NPR characterized Home Depot as "keeping quiet" in the midst of immigration raids at their stores across the country. ICE raids have not significantly impacted Home Depot sales. After the ICE raids at Home Depot, Home Depot has been the target of anti-ICE protests at stores in Mercer County, New Jersey, Los Angeles, Ladera Heights, Greenfield, Indiana, and New York City. In Mercer County, one protester said "We want Home Depot to do something, to pass a policy, to say something." 50 protesters with ICE Out of New Jersey bought $2.97 ice scrapers in New Jersey and immediately returned it to stall the store's operations, a type of protest used at other Home Depot stores across the country. Protesters also urged shoppers to boycott Home Depot. Police arrived and told protesters to leave the property. In Ladera Heights, during an ice scraper protest focused on Home Depot's "complicity" in "violating civil rights," a store was shut down for the day in its entirety. One activist said "I think they have a responsibility and certainly a moral obligation to defend day laborers."
Key Lime Air	Provided air charter services to transport detainees to ICE detention facilities	Advocates monitoring United States Immigration and Customs Enforcement (ICE) deportation flights in 2025, including Human Rights Watch, identified Key Lime Air as one of the charter operators flying deportees to ICE detention centers. Shackled deportees were seen boarding aircraft registered to a company affiliated with Key Lime at Willow Run Airport and King County International Airport, and disembarking at El Paso; Alexandria, Louisiana; Harlingen, Texas; and Lake City, Florida, site of the nearest airport to the Alligator Alcatraz detention facility. In December 2025, citing opposition to the ICE flights, the Denver City Council voted to deny Key Lime a lease for ground storage space at Denver International Airport, where Key Lime operates Denver Air Connection flights. The City Council lacks the authority to directly stop Key Lime from using the airport, and the airline can still use the common apron area at the airport for free; according to council members, the cancellation of the lease is aimed at jeopardizing $90 million in Federal Aviation Administration airport grants, which they believe will pressure the airline to vacate the airport. In January 2026, local advocates pressed the Wayne County Airport Authority board to stop Key Lime from operating ICE flights from Willow Run, but the board said it does not control agreements between airlines and federal agencies as long as they meet legal and safety requirements.
L3Harris	Provided Stingray phone trackers	Records of purchases of these devices were published. The upgrade Crossbows this product was also purchased by federal agencies. Despite public records showing that millions of dollars worth of product were purchased, the federal agencies have lacked transparency when requested to provide information about where and how these devices are used.
HBO Max	Aired ICE recruitment ads	
Hulu	Aired ICE recruitment ads	
Microsoft	Provided Azure cloud services to ICE in 2019; NYC protesters shut down a Microsoft campus	On September 14, 2019, Microsoft's flagship store was shut down by protestors as part of a direct action organized by Close the Camps NYC. The action was in response to Microsoft's $19.4 million contract with U.S. Immigration and Customs Enforcement (ICE). Microsoft's relationship with the immigration enforcement agency was revealed by executive Tom Keane, through a company blog post that described ICE's use of the company's high-security cloud storage product Azure Government. He went on to say the company is "proud to support" the work of ICE. As of January 2026, ICE had more than tripled the amount of data stored in Microsoft's Azure platform.
NEC	Created an AI facial recognition app for ICE agents to identify individuals and their potential immigration status.	Mobile Fortify is a mobile app used by United States Immigration and Customs Enforcement (ICE) on their government-issued phones. The app allows agents to take a photo in order to gather biometrics, including contactless fingerprints and faceprints, for the purpose of identifying an individual and their potential immigration status. The app was created by NEC. Unlike other facial recognition software, Fortify uses federally linked databases. By contrast, Clearview AI uses public social media databases for biometric scanning. Federal databases include DHS's automated biometric identification system (IDENT), containing more than 270 million biometric records, and Customs and Border Protection's Traveler Verification Service. The State Department's visa and passport photo database, the FBI's National Crime Information Center, National Law Enforcement Telecommunications Systems, and CBP's TECS and Seized Assets and Case Tracing System (SEACATS). Mobile Fortify, and ICE's use of similar biometric identification technologies (such as Mobile Identify, an app similar to Mobile Fortify to be used by local or regional law enforcement to assist in immigration enforcement) has faced scrutiny from a variety of digital rights organizations, politicians, and news outlets. The criticism is already considered to potentially be a reason why the similar Mobile Identify app was pulled from the Google Play Store. Facial recognition technologies are known to produce false-positives and generally unreliable results, especially on those with darker skin tones. ICE has already previously mistakenly arrested a U.S. citizen under the belief he was illegally in the country, and later stated that he "could be deported based on biometric confirmation of his identity" prior to his release. U.S. representative Bennie Thompson, ranking member of the House Homeland Security Committee has previously commented that "ICE officials have told us that an apparent biometric match by Mobile Fortify is a ‘definitive’ determination of a person's status and that an ICE officer may ignore evidence of American citizenship—including a birth certificate—if the app says the person is an alien," and that "Mobile Fortify is a dangerous tool in the hands of ICE, and it puts American citizens at risk of detention and even deportation," On January 19, 2026, 404 Media reported on a case where a woman, identified in court documents as "MJMA", was scanned by Mobile Fortify twice in the same interaction, and two entirely different names were provided by the app. According to the Innovation Law Lab, whose attorneys are representing MJMA, both of the names were incorrect. ICE has stated that they will not allow people to decline to be scanned by Mobile Fortify, and that photos taken, even those of U.S. citizens, will be stored for 15 years, something that has been criticized primarily because ICE has not performed a Privacy Impact Assessment (PIA) for Mobile Fortify, the right to decline other forms of biometric verification to the U.S. government is often available under other circumstances, and the 15 year window is viewed as unnecessarily large.
Palantir	Created an AI-based app for ICE, partially based on government records, that predicts where illegal immigrants may be residing	According to required financial disclosures, Stephen Miller, who as United States homeland security advisor has been actively involved in the second Trump administration's deportation efforts, owns between $100,000 and $250,000 of Palantir stock; some Trump critics have raised concerns about a potential conflict of interest. Similar financial disclosure requirements of U.S. government employees show that at least 10 other members of the Trump administration own Palantir stock. Advocacy groups such as the Alliance for Secure AI have also criticized Palantir's use of AI during the second Trump administration. In February 2025, The New York Times reported that Trump and Palantir were compiling a master list of personal information on every American that could give Trump "untold surveillance power" by illegally combining information from various government departments. In December 2025, it was reported that Palantir had begun to develop a portal for the Department of Education allowing universities to report foreign donations. The company is acting as a subcontractor of Monkton, a computer and network security company, which won a $9.8 million contract to design, develop, and deploy a "Section 117 Information Sharing Environment Capable of Providing Greater Transparency". ELITE (Enhanced Leads Identification and Targeting for Enforcement) is a software tool Palantir developed for the US Immigration and Customs Enforcement (ICE) agency. The program provides a digital map populated with information about potential deportation targets, pulling data from the United States Department of Health and Human Services (which includes Medicaid), among other sources, to estimate the locations of the agency's targets.
Paragon Solutions	$2 million contract selling spyware, such as phone hacking software, to ICE, especially to infiltrate anti-ICE protesting networks	Paragon sells to the United States government. The New York Times reported that the Biden administration allowed the Drug Enforcement Administration to use Graphite. Paragon reportedly hired WestExec Advisors in 2019, as well as Holland & Knight in 2023, to advise it on remaining in the US government's good graces. In March of 2023, President Joe Biden issued Executive Order 14093, banning "operational use by the United States Government of commercial spyware that poses risks to national security or has been misused by foreign actors to enable human rights abuses around the world." In 2024, a $2 million contract with US Immigration and Customs Enforcement (ICE) was reportedly paused and placed under compliance review, "to review and verify compliance with Executive Order 14093." According to Wired, experts said that "the level of seriousness with which the US government approaches the compliance review of the Paragon contract will influence international trust in the executive order." Following the January 2025 inauguration of President Donald Trump, the second Trump administration reversed or circumvented the Biden-era ban, and began acquiring phone-hacking spyware (notably Paragon Solutions' Graphite.). In 2025, Trump lifted the pause, allowing ICE to use Paragon's spyware tools. In September 2025, Trump labeled "Antifa" a "domestic terrorist organization," and issued an executive order to all federal agencies to investigate it. ICE acting director, Todd Lyons, said in an interview that ICE will investigate anti-ICE protester networks, "to track the money. We are going to track these ringleaders... and... professional agitators." In October 2025, reporter Rachel Maddow warned that ICE's new surveillance resources — including their spyware, which she said can be covertly inserted into anyone's phone from a drone hovering over a protest — can be used to target and spy on anyone without a warrant, including any political opposition. Former government officials, Democratic politicians, and civil rights advocates, have complained that ICE is now being permitted and empowered to engage in sweeping surveillance and tracking of Americans engaging in constitutionally permissible political action. In April 2026, acting director of ICE Todd Lyons confirmed in a letter to the House Committee on Oversight and Government Reform that the agency was using Graphite.
Snapchat	Aired ICE recruitment ads	
Spotify	Aired ICE recruitment ads; later stated they would no longer air ads for ICE	In October 2025, Spotify was criticized for running recruitment advertisements for ICE after receiving $74,000 from the Department of Homeland Security. In January 2026, Spotify confirmed ICE ads are no longer running on their platform after the government advertising campaign ended. Later that month, the advocacy group Indivisible sent a public letter to Spotify's new CEOs calling on the company to pledge to stop running ICE ads going forward.
YouTube	Aired ICE recruitment ads	
Airlines Reporting Corporation		
MVM, Inc.		
WidePoint Corporation		
Accenture		
CSI Aviation		
Behavioral Interventions (B.I. INCORPORATED)		
CACI		

== See also ==
- United States Department of Homeland Security § Surveillance
