= Jeffrey Epstein (60 Minutes segment) =

A segment on Jeffrey Epstein's bank transactions was originally part of a planned episode of 60 Minutes, a television news magazine from CBS News. Presented by correspondent Sharyn Alfonsi, the segment discusses the relationship between Epstein and Deutsche Bank AG, JPMorgan Chase, and Bank of America.

The segment included an interview with Senate Finance Committee Ranking Member Ron Wyden and Senate Finance Committee Ranking Member given in March 2026. An August 2026 report published by the Senate Finance Committee wrote that the interview had been "suppressed".

Alfonsi left 60 Minutes in May 2026, issuing a written statement outlining an "intense editorial dispute" over a separate 60 Minutes segment on El Salvador’s CECOT prison.

CBS News subsequently denied the allegations, with a spokesperson describing the claim as "categorically false."

== Report ==
On August 4, 2026, Democrats on the Senate Finance Committee released a 67-page report titled "‘Looking the Other Way: How Wall Street Banks enabled Jeffrey Epstein's sex trafficking".

The report alleges over a dozen bankers were aware of suspicious transactions made by Epstein dating back to 2002, and that bankers did not disclose this activity to the Treasury Department until after Epstein's arrest for sex trafficking.

== See also ==
- Inside CECOT
