= Torture of immigrants during the second Trump administration =

Immigrants tortured in ICE detention facilities

Human rights experts argue Immigration and Customs Enforcement (ICE) officers' treatment of immigrants in custody during the second Trump administration meets the legal definition of torture according to the UN Convention Against Torture. Immigrants have described detention facilities as "torture chambers", "hell on earth", and as an "endless nightmare". Over 70,000 people were in ICE custody in January 2026 compared to an average of 30,000 in the middle of the Biden administration. There have been at least 58 deaths in ICE detention between January 2025 and October 2026.

One method of torture used against detainees is restraining their feet to the ground for hours outside in a small cage called "the box", exposing them to mosquitoes, insects, and dangerous humidity levels without water. Another method is putting them in "the WRAP", a straitjacket-like full-body restraint that can restrict breathing used to punish detainees for expressing fear about being deported or asking for their attorneys. Guards create an atmosphere of "terror and humiliation", often berating detainees with racial slurs or insults and banging on their cages. Detainees are subjected to prolonged solitary confinement, are given scarce food portions sometimes containing maggots, and are sometimes forced to sleep exposed to extreme weather conditions, insects, and fecal matter.

== Background ==
The second Trump administration has expanded immigration detention in the United States as part of the administration's mass deportation policy. On January 23, 2025, ICE began to carry out raids on sanctuary cities, with hundreds of immigrants detained. The Trump administration reversed the policy of the previous administration and gave ICE permission to raid schools, hospitals and places of worship. Fears of ICE raids have negatively impacted the agriculture, construction, tourism, and hospitality industries. ICE agents conducting raids frequently travel in unmarked vehicles, wear plainclothes and facial coverings, and refuse to identify themselves or present warrants. The administration ordered the re-opening of the Guantanamo Bay detention camp to hold potentially tens of thousands of illegal aliens, but has faced logistical and legal difficulties using it as an immigrant camp. The majority of detentions have been for non-violent matters. Courts have ruled more than 4,400 times that the Trump administration is detaining people illegally. Several US citizens have been detained. In October 2025, around 3,000 people were detained by ICE in the Chicago metropolitan area during Operation Midway Blitz. Government officials refused or were unable to confirm their whereabouts. In July 2026, 49,571 people were arrested by United States Immigration and Customs Enforcement, the highest monthly arrest total during Trump's second presidential term by that point.

== Legal definition of torture ==
Amnesty International and Physicians for Human Rights have argued that ICE agents' treatment of immigrants in custody meet the legal definition of torture.

Amnesty states that,

According to Article 1(1) of the UN Convention Against Torture, an act constitutes torture if four elements are present: (1) intention, (2) infliction of severe physical or mental pain or suffering, (3) a purpose such as coercion, intimidation, obtaining information or a confession, or discrimination, and (4) a degree of official involvement.

Torture is distinct from cruel, inhuman, or degrading treatment, which lacks one of these four elements and is not defined under international law. Amnesty emphasizes how the UN Convention Against Torture obligates states to take measures to prevent torture in any territory under their jurisdictions, meaning under international law the United States is obligated to stop torturing immigrants. Amnesty primarily analyzed two detention facilities in Florida: Krome North Service Processing Center, and the now-closed Alligator Alcatraz.

== Methods of torture ==
=== Restraints ===
Restraints have been used on detainees in a way that is "automatic, prolonged, and indiscriminate". Amnesty argues restraints are used in situations where they are not necessary and are therefore used as tools to inflict physical and psychological suffering through humiliation and control.

The main kind of restraint used is shackles, which in one case was used to connect a group of immigrants' feet to bus seats for about 28 hours while their hands were shackled to their waists and they were denied food and water. Whenever prisoners leave their cages, they are shackled.

At Alligator Alcatraz, detainees were restrained to the ground for extended periods of time inside a small 2-by-2-foot cage called "the box". "The box" was outside, leaving detainees exposed to the temperature, humidity, and tropical climate of South Florida. "The box" was used as a punishment for detainees, and those placed inside were not given water and exposed for hours to insects and mosquitoes.

Another kind of restraint used is a full-body restraint called "the WRAP" (also referred to by agents as "the burrito" or "the bag"). "The WRAP" was developed by Safe Restraints, Inc. and is used on deportation flights and also as a punishment on detainees for asking to speak with their attorneys or expressing fear about being deported. One deportee left his flight with his legs swollen to the point he walked with a limp, describing the device as a straitjacket. "The WRAP" has been used to suspend people at steep angles that can restrict breathing for hours at a time against the product's guidelines, and doctors warn it creates risk of "nerve compression injuries, reduced circulation, respiratory distress, and trauma".

=== Prolonged solitary confinement ===
At Krome North Service Processing Center, prolonged solitary confinement—defined as solitary confinement for longer than 15 days—is used to punish detainees rather than as a last resort. ICE officers say the maximum penalty of solitary confinement is 30 days, but they can give longer penalties while the individual is in solitary confinement. According to Physicians Without Borders, the average duration of solitary confinement in 2020–2024 was about 30 days and some detainees spent over two years in solitary confinement.

Prolonged solitary confinement is prohibited in the Mandela Rules in international law. According to Physicians for Human Rights, solitary confinement can cause "PTSD, self-harm, and suicide risks", whereas prolonged solitary confinement can lead to "lasting brain damage, hallucinations, confusion, disrupted sleep, and reduced cognitive function" that can result in "enduring psychological and physical disabilities". People with pre-existing medical and mental health conditions are at especially high risk of developing disabilities in solitary confinement, but many have been put into prolonged solitary confinement regardless. In one pre-2025 group examined by Physicians for Human Rights, solitary confinement created new mental health conditions and symptoms among 67% of detainees it was used on.

=== Medical neglect and denial of care ===
Officials consistently deny medical treatment to detainees, including to a man who was bitten by a spider, developed an infection, and later needed emergency surgery because he was denied treatment. Three guards made fun of a detainee recovering in the hospital from kidney stones, laughing at him when his wife, who did not know where he was, appeared on TV. In a California City detention facility, one man with a chronic stomach ulcer was not provided with medication or proper diet to treat his condition, so he went on hunger strike hoping it would lead to receiving proper care; a week later, he began vomiting blood and fainted, triggering a code blue medical emergency, and he has since developed new medical conditions in custody.

California City, run by private prison company CoreCivic, is "extraordinarily deprived of adequate medical care" according to a nonprofit attorney, and according to California's attorney general Rob Bonta, it does not have adequate doctors proportional to its detainee population. Senators Alex Padilla and Adam Schiff toured the facility and said the biggest concerns were about lack of medical attention, which it can take "weeks or months" for detainees to receive including for urgent matters. One man was denied heart medications and did not receive aspirin for five days after being transferred, so he was rushed to the emergency room twice after experiencing extreme chest pain and paralysis. One man with indicators of prostate cancer was scheduled to receive a diagnostic prostate biopsy, but after he was transferred, staff did not diagnose and treat his potential cancer, increasing its risk of metastasizing and becoming fatal.

=== Emotional abuse ===
At Alligator Alcatraz, guards made racist and discriminatory comments to detainees (including the use of racial slurs), banged on the cages of detainees, yelled at detainees, tried to provoke detainees, and created an atmosphere of "terror and humiliation".

=== Force feeding ===
The Guardian has reported 10 separate cases in Trump's second term in which ICE subjected or attempted to subject detained hunger strikers to involuntary medical procedures, including force-feeding. Forcing medical procedures on detained hunger strikers is viewed as torture by many human rights groups and medical organizations.

=== Inhumane detention conditions ===
Florida governor Ron DeSantis said, "You'll have a lot of people that will deport on their own because they don't want to end up in an 'Alligator Alcatraz'", which Amnesty interpreted to mean that facilities are intentionally kept in inhuman detention conditions (possibly satisfying the intentionality element of torture). In February 2025, former Secretary of Homeland Security Kristi Noem told immigrants that "overwhelmingly, what encourages people to go back home voluntarily is the consequences," which The New Yorker interpreted to mean the same thing.

According to Amnesty, writing of the now closed Alligator Alcatraz,

Individuals detained at "Alligator Alcatraz" are confined in large metal cages under large plastic tents, each holding up to 32 people and surrounded by chain-link fencing and barbed wire. [...] They were only given around 20 minutes of outdoor access a day but often went days without being allowed outside. The lights remain on permanently, and frequent power outages disrupt ventilation and air conditioning, creating alternating periods of extreme heat and cold. Flooding is common, and the men reported exposure to insects and mosquitos without any protective measures.

These cages, despite holding only 32 people each, had three toilets which often overflowed, causing "fecal matter to seep into the area where people are sleeping", and requiring detainees to unclog the toilets with their bare hands. There were cameras above these toilets, which were out in the open and offered no privacy. Shower access was sometimes limited to under once per week. Detainees were woken up in the middle of the night to shower, and when shower access was provided, the water was often very cold or very hot.

Detainees were given only 15 minutes to eat each meal, and meal portions are extremely small, often causing hunger. The food was sometimes full of maggots, and one detainee reported opening the water jug of the cage he was in only to find a large insect. Another detainee reported seeing a large snake in the camp, and further claimed that a friend was bitten by a spider that laid eggs inside of him.

Although each cage was equipped with a telephone that detainees could make collect calls to family and legal representation from, access to these phones was limited; individual detainees were not allowed to use the telephone for more than 15 minutes.

Some detainees have claimed that these poor conditions, in addition to others such as medical care denial, were used to encourage detainees to "self-deport" from detention facilities to their countries of origin before they had the opportunity to make it through the required legal processes and be permitted to leave the facility and return to the U.S. Amnesty claims "These conditions reflect a pattern of deliberate neglect designed to dehumanize and punish those detained at 'Alligator Alcatraz' with the aim of making their detention unbearable" so that detainees self-deport.
