= WidePoint Corporation =

American technology company

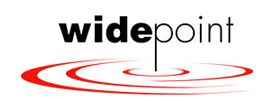
- Company type: Public
- Traded as: AMEX: WYY
- Industry: Technology, Communications, Mobility Management, Identity Management
- Founded: 1997; 29 years ago
- Headquarters: 11250 Waples Mill Road, South Tower, Suite 210 Fairfax, Virginia, USA
- Key people: CEO: Jin Kang, CSMO: Jason Holloway
- Revenue: $83.7 million USD (2018)
- Net income: $1.8 million USD (2018)
- Number of employees: 204

WidePoint Corporation is an American company based in Fairfax, Virginia that provides technology-based products and services to the government sector and commercial markets in the United States. The company holds a patent for a digital parsing tool that allows users to access accounts through a secure repository gateway, established using asymmetric authentication employed as public key infrastructure (PKI). WidePoint provides smart card identity verification, wireless expense management, penetration testing and other IT devices and services. WidePoint's subsidiary ORC is an authorized certification authority (CA) for the Department of Defense and other government agencies.

WidePoint was incorporated in Delaware on May 30, 1997 and has grown through mergers between IT consulting firms. The company includes three business groups offering wireless mobility management, cybersecurity solutions and consulting services.

The Company is headquartered in Fairfax, Virginia and has additional offices in Northern Virginia as well as Columbus, Ohio, Los Angeles, California, and Dublin, Ireland.

== Acquisition history ==
In November 2004, WidePoint acquired ORC, followed by iSYS in January 2008. The company also operates WidePoint IL, Inc. and Protexx Acquisition Corp, which was acquired in July 2008.

== Subsidiaries ==
=== iSYS ===
iSYS, LLC, provides IT services for federal and private organizations. It was founded in 1999 and purchased by WidePoint in January 2008. iSYS provides services in expense management, forensic informatics, and cybersecurity.

=== ORC ===
ORC provides IT integration and secure authentication services to the U.S. Government. It is an authorized certificate authority for the United States Department of Defense, GSA, and many other certificate-based authorities.

=== Protexx ===
Protexx provides remote authentication over wired and wireless networks.

=== Advance Response Concepts Corporation ===
ARCC provides identity verification and emergency coordination between emergency services and infrastructure agencies as well as evidence tracking software for the Department of Justice.

== Government contracts ==
Most of WidePoint's government client base is located in the Mid-Atlantic region. WidePoint holds contracts with the Transportation Security Administration, the Department of Homeland Security, the Department of Defense, Washington Headquarters Services, the U.S. Customs and Border Protection, and the Centers for Disease Control.

== Competition ==
WidePoint has large, mid-size and small competitors in each segment of its services. Its main competition in mobility management includes Avalon Technologies, Profitline and Tangoe. In cybersecurity and consulting, WidePoint's key competitors are Lockheed Martin Corporation and Northrop Grumman Corporation.
