= Inside CECOT =

2025 TV segment on Salvadoran prison torture

A screenshot of the segment

"Inside CECOT" is a segment that was originally intended to be broadcast on the December 21, 2025, episode of 60 Minutes, a television news magazine from CBS News. Presented by correspondent Sharyn Alfonsi, the segment discusses the experiences of detainees at the Terrorism Confinement Center (CECOT), a maximum security prison in El Salvador used to confine Venezuelan migrants who had been deported from the US by the Trump administration in early 2025. The segment, which contains interviews with former detainees and photographic evidence detailing systematic torture at the facility, independently corroborates earlier conclusions made by Human Rights Watch. Reports by former detainees and journalists have described "El Salvador's CECOT" as a "living nightmare" and "hellscape" due to the extremely harsh conditions and high-tech surveillance present in the facility.

Three hours prior to broadcast, CBS News announced that the segment had been pulled and would be broadcast at a later date; Alfonsi accused CBS News's new editor-in-chief Bari Weiss of spiking the story for political reasons. Weiss claimed that the story "was not ready" for broadcast; sources within CBS News told outlets including The New York Times that two days before the anticipated broadcast, Weiss had asked the producers to arrange an interview with Trump administration operative Stephen Miller, who designed the deportation policy, or an administration operative of similar rank. Alfonsi stated in an email memorandum to colleagues that the production team did request comments and interviews from White House officials, the State Department, and the Department of Homeland Security (which were all refused), and that the segment was reviewed five times and approved by the CBS legal department and Standards and Practices division.

On December 22, 2025, a cut of the episode that still contained the "Inside CECOT" story was accidentally made available online by Canadian broadcaster Global, causing the segment to be widely disseminated. The segment was shared en masse by activists, causing it to quickly spread across the internet; most iterations of it were removed after CBS began issuing takedown orders via the Digital Millennium Copyright Act, though it remains on archival sites and several irregular distribution platforms. Weiss met with major backlash from numerous journalists, progressive groups, and public officials, who deemed the cancellation unjustified, and to have been carried out at the behest of the Trump administration.

The segment eventually aired in an updated form on the January 18, 2026, episode of 60 Minutes; while the body of the report was unchanged, it was updated to include a new introduction and conclusion by Alfonsi with statements from White House and DHS officials, as well as acknowledgements of the United States' subsequent intervention in Venezuela and capture of president Nicolás Maduro in January 2026.

== Background ==
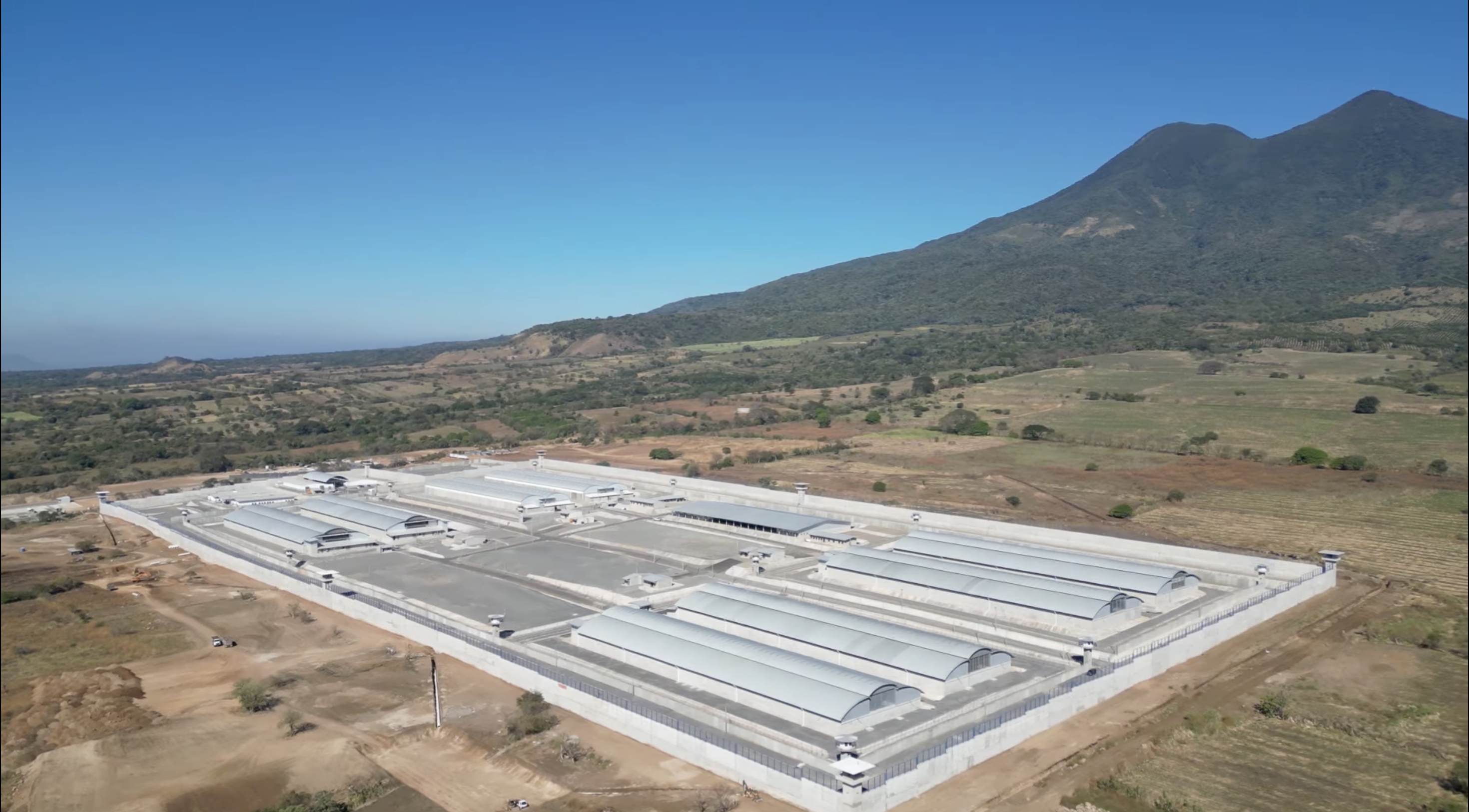
An aerial view of the Terrorism Confinement Center

The Terrorism Confinement Center (CECOT) is a maximum security prison in El Salvador. Its original purpose was to house individuals accused or convicted of gang membership amid a large-scale crackdown on gangs by the administration of Nayib Bukele that began in 2022. Under the second Trump administration, the prison has held some individuals deported from the United States under a $6 million deal with the Salvadoran government.

252 Venezuelan migrants were sent to the prison in March 2025 despite a federal court temporarily blocking the order, determining that the administration did not have grounds to deport them under the Alien Enemies Act of 1798. The identities of the migrants were not disclosed by the Trump administration prior to their deportation; no proof of criminal wrongdoing was provided by US authorities, nor was evidence that the detainees were members of Tren de Aragua, the Venezuelan gang whose alleged "invasion" was used to justify the invocation of wartime powers by the Trump administration.

A joint report published in November 2025 by Human Rights Watch and Cristosal showed evidence of "systematic torture and abuse" by prison officials. They concluded that the men "were subjected to what amounts to arbitrary detention and enforced disappearance under international human rights law". Their findings showed evidence of additional human rights abuses:

[T]he people held in CECOT were subjected to inhumane prison conditions, including prolonged incommunicado detention, inadequate food, denial of basic hygiene and sanitation, limited access to health care and medicine, and lack of recreational or educational activities, in violation of several provisions of the United Nations Standard Minimum Rules for the Treatment of Prisoners ... detainees were subjected to constant beatings and other forms of ill-treatment, including some cases of sexual violence.

Inmates were held without contact to the outside world until July 18, when they were released to Venezuela as part of a prisoner exchange between the Salvadoran and Venezuelan governments. Inmate testimony and the details of their detention led the organizations to contend that the Trump administration was "complicit in torture, enforced disappearance, and other grave violations".

=== Paramount Skydance and CBS ===
Meanwhile, in the lead-up to the acquisition of CBS parent company Paramount Global by Skydance Media, it was suggested that Paramount and CBS News had been increasingly currying favor with the second Trump administration in order to ensure regulatory approval, including settling a lawsuit accusing CBS News of editing a 60 Minutes interview with then-presidential candidate Kamala Harris to sway public interest. In July, CBS declined to renew The Late Show with Stephen Colbert—widely regarded as critical of Trump's administration—shortly after host Stephen Colbert criticized the settlement on-air (with the network claiming this was for budgetary reasons), and "explicitly promised the Federal Communications Commission" (FCC) that they would work to diversify the viewpoints they broadcast moving forward.

In October 2025, after the acquisition had taken place, Paramount Skydance acquired Bari Weiss's The Free Press, enlisting Weiss to be editor-in-chief of CBS News. The decision was criticized by some within the network, given that Weiss's background was primarily in opinion and commentary, having no experience working in broadcast journalism. Upon her recruitment at CBS, she was "given a mandate to reshape the network's editorial coverage toward a more centrist viewpoint"; Weiss does not answer to CBS News president and executive editor Tom Cibrowski, but rather reports directly to David Ellison, chairman and CEO of Paramount Skydance.

On December 12, 2025, at the Walter Cronkite Award presentation, former CBS Evening News anchor and long-time 60 Minutes correspondent Scott Pelley said that the program had yet to experience "corporate interference of any kind" since the Paramount Skydance takeover, explaining that "it's early yet, but what I can tell you is we are doing the same kinds of stories with the same kind of rigor".

== Broadcast postponement ==
On the afternoon of December 21, 2025, prior to the airing of the episode, CBS News announced the CECOT segment had been pulled from the episode, and would air at a later date, without disclosing a reason. Multiple sources and commentators noted that this action was almost unprecedented, with stories almost never being pulled after such a vigorous screening process as typically occurs at 60 Minutes. The story was replaced by two segments, one concerning a family of classical musicians in England, the other an extended piece on the work of Mount Everest's Sherpas.

Weiss's decisions followed commentary by Trump implying that he ultimately held control over the outcome of a battle between Paramount Skydance and Netflix to acquire Warner Bros. Discovery. In a Truth Social post, Trump was critical of the Ellison family (owners of Paramount Skydance) over his perception that 60 Minutes had unjustly portrayed him in a negative light. In the post, Trump stated,

For those people that think I am close with the new owners of CBS, please understand that 60 Minutes has treated me far worse since the so-called 'takeover', than they have ever treated me before. If they are friends, I'd hate to see my enemies!

In an email sent to colleagues, Alfonsi accused Weiss of intervening for political reasons, referencing the fact that the Trump administration had declined due-diligence requests for comment by 60 Minutes staff. She accused the Trump administration of dodging those requests in an effort to avoid criticism for its deportation and imprisonment of hundreds of individuals without trial, among them many who had no discernably relevant criminal history, or who displayed no "clear evidence of past wrongdoing". She argued that CBS was "trading 50 years of 'Gold Standard' reputation for a single week of political quiet". Alfonsi asserted that the story was "factually correct" and had been "screened five times and cleared by both CBS attorneys and Standards and Practices." She added:

Pulling it now—after every rigorous internal check has been met is not an editorial decision, it is a political one. ... Government silence is a statement, not a VETO. Their refusal to be interviewed is a tactical maneuver designed to kill the story. ... If the administration's refusal to participate becomes a valid reason to spike a story, we have effectively handed them a 'kill switch' for any reporting they find inconvenient.

=== Aftermath and internal deliberation ===
In a meeting the following morning, Weiss said that the report was pulled because it "was not ready", and that it did not "advance the ball" beyond what had been reported by other outlets. She elaborated,

The Times and other outlets have previously done similar work. The public knows that Venezuelans have been subjected to horrific treatment at this prison. To run a story on this subject two months later, we need to do more. And this is 60 Minutes. We need to be able to get the principals on the record and on camera. Our viewers come first. Not the listing schedule or anything else.

At the meeting, 60 Minutes correspondent Scott Pelley again brought up the fact that Weiss had not turned up to any of the five internal screenings of the segment during the final stages of editing. Pundits have noted that her intervention came only after the piece had been finalized and promoted on social media. CBS News publicly announced the segment was postponed only three hours before the anticipated broadcast.

Speaking to sources within CBS News, the New York Times pieced together a more detailed timeline of the story's progress. The first of five internal screenings that Weiss did not attend took place on December 12. Three days before the anticipated December 21 broadcast, Weiss watched the segment and sent suggestions that producers then incorporated into the segment's script. Two days before the anticipated broadcast, Weiss asked producers to interview White House operative Stephen Miller, the architect of Trump's migrant deportation program, or an operative of similar rank. Miller later stated that he did not remember receiving any requests for comment from CBS for the story.

Alfonsi had requested an interview with Secretary of Homeland Security Kristi Noem roughly a month before the feature was to be broadcast, but received no response; following additional requests for comment made to their office, DHS referred all questions to the Salvadoran government. Axios has reported that the State Department provided comment as well. In a response sent on the 18th, the Trump administration questioned why 60 Minutes had not focused their efforts on the experiences of Angel Parents, "whose innocent American children [had] tragically been murdered by vicious illegal aliens that President Trump are [sic.] removing from the country." This response was passed over in favor of a quote from Karoline Leavitt during a March news briefing, which would later be questioned by Weiss in her rationale for pulling the segment.

In an email sent to staff on December 22, Weiss challenged the insinuations of several reported figures and quotations. Weiss questioned if there wasn't "much more to be asked" of the administration on account of the severity of the charges presented; this was in response to the segment's use of a recording of White House Press Secretary Karoline Leavitt's in which she stated that "[t]hese are heinous monsters, rapists, murderers, kidnappers, sexual assaulters, predators who have no right to be in this country, and they must be held accountable". Weiss had reportedly questioned the use of the word "migrants" to describe the Venezuelan deportees, concentrating on the fact that they were present in the country illegally. Weiss further argued that more needed to be done "to get [the] principals [of the administration] on record". She felt that the data presented painted an "incongruent picture", underscoring the fact that while nearly half of detainees had no criminal records, more than half did, and questioning to what extent the reported fact that "only 8 of the 252 detainees [had] been sentenced ... for violent offenses" concealed the potential fact that others had been charged. She felt that reporting failed to grant due consideration to the administration's real position, stating,

The admin has argued in court that detainees are due "judicial review"—and we should explain this, with a voice arguing that Trump is exceeding his authority under the relevant statute, and another arguing that he's operating within the bounds of his authority.

Thereafter, Weiss purportedly organized a "big managers' crisis meeting" at the network's New York office to respond to the public criticism generated by the segment's cancellation. On December 24, Weiss, alongside senior leadership at CBS, sent a memorandum to staff defending her decision to pull the story and rejecting accusations that it was politically motivated. The memorandum was signed by Weiss, CBS News president Tom Cibrowski, and editors Charles Forelle and Adam Rubenstein. They stated,

Right now, the majority of Americans say they do not trust the press ... To win back their trust, we have to work hard...sometimes [that] means holding a piece about an important subject to make sure it is comprehensive and fair ... Such editorial decisions can cause a firestorm ... the standards for fairness we are holding ourselves to ... will surely feel controversial to those used to doing things one way. But to fulfill our mission, it's necessary ... No amount of outrage—whether from activist organizations or the White House—will derail us. We are not out to score points with one side of the political spectrum or to win followers on social media. We are out to inform the American public and to get the story right[.]

==== Leak by Canadian broadcaster ====
On December 22, 2025, it was discovered that Canadian broadcaster Global had placed the original cut of the December 21 episode—which still contained the CECOT segment—on its video on demand service, instead of the version that actually aired. Amid efforts by Paramount Skydance to issue DMCA takedown requests to stifle its dissemination, progressive personalities quickly began spreading the episode online, resulting in video of the segment being widely shared on social media, archival platforms such as the Internet Archive and Distributed Denial of Secrets, and via torrents.

According to a statement sent by CBS News to The Globe and Mail, the Canadian network had been sent the original cut the preceding Friday; after being informed on Saturday that the episode would change, Global simulcasted the revised episode on its broadcast stations on Sunday night, but then "mistakenly published" the original version online the following day. Global quickly removed the episode from its online platform. On December 24, 2025, Global parent company Corus Entertainment confirmed that an episode that "was not intended to be published" was "briefly made available on the Global TV App on Monday and promptly removed when brought to our attention. We do not produce and make no editorial decisions whatsoever regarding this show".

== Eventual airing and episode synopses ==
=== Airing and version differences ===
On January 18, 2026, CBS announced that the "Inside CECOT" segment would air during that night's episode of 60 Minutes. It was noted that CBS had aired the episode against an NFL divisional playoff game on NBC that was anticipated to have a significant audience, leading to suggestions that this was done intentionally to reduce its profile. The body of the segment was unchanged in the new version, but Alfonsi's introduction and closing were updated to include references to the United States' January 2026 intervention in Venezuela and capture of Venezuelan president Nicolás Maduro and first lady Cilia Flores, and to include off-camera statements provided by White House and Department of Homeland Security officials.

=== Official airing synopsis ===
The official broadcast of the segment was set between interviews with top ICE and Minneapolis law enforcement officials concerning the killing of Renee Good and subsequent protests in Minneapolis amid Operation Metro Surge, and a piece detailing the saltwater crocodile habitats surrounding Darwin, Australia. Alfonsi notes early in the segment the refusal of relevant officials in the Trump administration to be interviewed. The segment is introduced at the beginning of the episode with footage of Venezuelan men detained by ICE and deported from the United States arriving by plane in El Salvador. They are shown shackled and paraded off the plane by Salvadoran security forces, as Alfonsi explains that the men were led to believe that they were being deported to Venezuela, but were ultimately delivered to the Terrorism Confinement Center, where "they endured 4 months of hell".

Alfonsi details the fallout of the capture of Nicolas Maduro in the 2026 United States intervention in Venezuela, which the Trump administration called "a blow to narcoterrorists" who had "flooded US streets with drugs". She explains the impact Maduro's repression had on the substantial volume of Venezuelan migrants and refugees arriving in the United States from the country, and the fact that many such individuals were arrested and deported in the early months of the immigration crackdown of the second Trump administration. Alfonsi recounts the president's branding of such migrants as "terrorists" and invocation of the Alien Enemies Act to facilitate their deportation.

The segment then repeats footage played in the episode's introduction, where Venezuelan migrant detainees are shown exiting a plane in El Salvador, shackled and paraded in front of cameras, whereafter they were sent by bus to CECOT. It cuts to an interview with one detainee, who recounts that the first thing told to him and other inmates by the prison director was that they would "never see the light of day again", and that he would "make sure they would never leave". Alfonsi recounts the interviewee's travel from Venezuela to Mexico, where he waited to have his asylum case heard in the United States. He said US Customs and Border Protection agents told him in 2024 that he was a "danger to society", despite an evidently spotless civil and criminal record. He was thereafter detained for 6 months as his case was processed, then sent alongside 251 other Venezuelan migrants to CECOT.

Inside the facility, prisoners were bound by their hands and feet. Upon arrival, they were forced to their knees and their heads shaven. The interviewee recounts "blood everywhere, screams, people crying, people who couldn't take it and were urinating and vomiting on themselves." He said guards would beat prisoners bare fisted and with batons, and that he had been beaten "to the point of agony".

Alfonsi narrates the history of Nayib Bukele's gang crackdown from the policy's beginnings in 2022, including the leader's ritualized and ostentatious management of CECOT and its harsh living conditions. Detainees are expected to sleep in bunks stacked four high without pillows or blankets, and lights are kept on 24 hours a day. They do not have access to clean water. One former detainee told Alfonsi that those who fail to kneel for 24 hours are sent to "the island", a small cell without light or ventilation, where they are beaten every half hour. Other inmates alleged sexual abuse, consistent with a Human Rights Watch report released in November.

Alfonsi highlights the inconsistency of a 2023 report by the State Department, which "cited torture and life-threatening prison conditions" and President Trump's seeming admiration for the facility and for the broader policies of the Salvadoran government. She interviewed the director of the Human Rights Center Investigations Lab at the University of California, Berkeley, as well as Juan Pappier, the deputy director of Human Rights Watch; Alfonsi noted that 60 Minutes independently corroborated the conclusion of Human Rights Watch that CECOT was carrying out "systematic torture" on detainees, and that nearly half the men in CECOT do not have a criminal history. Only eight men had reportedly been "sentenced for violent or potentially violent crimes" according to Immigrations and Customs Enforcement (ICE) data.

== Reactions and commentary ==
Weiss's decision attracted widespread condemnation, including by American legislators and journalists. It has been defended by conservative commentators both within and outside the Trump administration.

Both journalists and pundits have questioned whether, or asserted that Weiss's actions represent an effort by CBS to quiet negative commentary on the administration to guarantee a favorable outcome in Paramount Skydance's efforts to acquire Warner Bros. Discovery. This resulted in accusations by some figures that such actions represented an abandonment of CBS News' commitment to journalistic integrity.

=== CBS staff ===
Many employees at CBS were supportive of Alfonsi in the immediate aftermath of the segment's cancellation. At a meeting with 60 Minutes staff the day after the segment was set to air, Scott Pelley told Alfonsi that he and other staff members were "incredibly proud" of her. He went on to state that "[y]ou are doing exactly what you're supposed to do—what this broadcast is about. And I think you're going to find all of us standing and cheering around you". Appearing on CNN, former 60 Minutes producer Chris Whipple offered the opinion that "[i]f Bari Weiss thought she was burying the story, she's done exactly the opposite. It's become a cause célèbre".

The Independent reported that Weiss "could soon be facing a 'revolt'", as a result of her choice to pull the story. Answering a request for comment by the platform, one reporter stated that Weiss had "likely crossed the Rubicon", another staffer was quoted as saying "holy fucking dumpster fire".

=== Trump administration ===
Stephen Miller called for CBS to fire all of the producers who "engaged in this revolt" against Weiss for pulling the segment, which he described as "another pathetic 60 Minutes hatchet job". Regarding the deportees imprisoned at CECOT, he stated, "They know that these are monsters, who got exactly what they deserved". He criticized 60 Minutes staff, stating that its producers were "living in comfort and security in their west end condos trying to make us feel sympathetic for these monsters". Little additional commentary has been reported as having come from the Trump administration in the aftermath of the story's release.

=== Public officials ===
Senator Brian Schatz wrote that "what is happening to CBS is a terrible embarrassment and if executives think they can build shareholder value by avoiding journalism that might offend the Mad King they are about to learn a tough lesson". Former Republican representative Adam Kinzinger made a series of posts on social media in which he referred to Paramount as "state-owned media" alongside proof that he had cancelled his subscription to the platform. Former Secretary of Labor Robert Reich wrote "I'm old enough to remember when CBS News would never have surrendered to a demagogic president".

Senator Ed Markey wrote that the postponement was a "sad day for 60 Minutes and journalism," and that "this is what government censorship looks like". Representative Ro Khanna wrote that "[a] free press isn't free if stories get shelved just because the powerful won't talk", adding that pulling the segment eroded trust, and that Americans were "losing trust that government and media serve us, not the elite".

Anna M. Gomez, an FCC member appointed by Joe Biden, stated that reports about the postponed segment were "deeply alarming and strike at the heart of press freedom".

=== Non-governmental organizations and observers ===
Human Rights Watch executive director Philippe Bolopion said he was troubled by Alfonsi's allegations about Weiss's decision, "especially in light of pressures on press freedom in the US." He asserted that "[t]he evidence is clear regardless of what airs ... the Trump administration disappeared these Venezuelan men to a mega prison ... where they were systematically tortured". A representative of Human Rights Watch was interviewed by Alfonsi in the postponed segment.

Writing for National Review, conservative commentator Noah Rothman defended Weiss's choice to postpone the piece. Though not denying nor defending what he described as "[t]he disturbing portrait CBS News painted of near-torturous conditions endured by CECOT inmates", he felt that Alfonsi had not acknowledged the administration's arguments for its actions in good faith, and that she presented "leading assertions" and "banal" framing that relied upon context from sources who would necessarily be hostile towards Trump administration officials. He surmised that "it [was] hard for an honest broker to gainsay Weiss's objections to the finished product CBS News was set to air", concluding that Weiss was only following standard procedure to maintain the network's credibility. He ultimately saw the fact that she was "the object of so many left-wing hatreds", occupying a role intended for someone "who wears her progressive preconceptions on her sleeve", as being the cause of the controversy.

Writing for The Atlantic, political commentator Jonathan Chait said Weiss afforded undue deference and weight to the perspectives of conservatives while denying the same legitimacy to arguments from left-leaning actors, implying that it represented a pattern of behavior witnessed previously in her editorial tenure at The Free Press. He questioned Weiss's assertion that the administration recognized the right of inmates to "judicial review", pointing to a federal court ruling that showed that "the government itself [had] not contested that these detainees 'received inadequate process prior to their removal'". He went on to argue that "conservatives would never accept a left-wing government using regulatory favoritism to pressure conservative media into softening their coverage of a Democratic administration".

Writing for Jacobin magazine, socialist political commentator Ben Burgis endorsed Alfonsi's view that if government representatives had to provide comment in order for 60 Minutes to air a story, the platform would "go from an investigative powerhouse to a stenographer for the state." He contended that the decision was made by "an editor-in-chief seemingly hired to curry favor with the Trump administration," arguing that such a process "[looked] unsettlingly like state censorship with extra steps". Burgis pointed to the fact that the detainees interviewed for the story "were taking a real and obvious risk in appearing on camera to document the abuses," particularly in light of the Trump administration's coinciding military forays into Venezuelan territory and acclaimed interest in "forcibly impos[ing] regime change" on the country.

In The New Republic, Parker Molloy compared the current state of 60 Minutes unfavorably to its state two decades prior, when it broke the story of prisoner abuse at Abu Ghraib at the hands of the US military.

Former CNN and ABC News correspondent and UMD journalism professor Mark Feldstein said that it was "virtually unprecedented" for a vetted story to be cancelled by an executive so close to air-time. He added that "CBS's proud legacy of journalistic integrity, going back to Edward R. Murrow and Walter Cronkite, is sadly tarnished in ways that may never be repaired".

Journalist Spencer Ackerman, who had worked as a consultant on a piece for 60 Minutes that was also pulled before airing, criticized the decision and Weiss's perceived lack of experience, describing her as "the oligarch functionary installed at CBS by new owner David Ellison". He stated, "Weiss simply has no idea what it took to report this story, and even less about the value of what her reporter delivered. Ellison would not have installed someone who did."

Political scientists Steven Levitsky and Lucan A. Way described the United States under the second presidency of Donald Trump as "soft competitive authoritarianism". In an article for the Journal of Democracy, they argued that the Trump administration used its political power to weaponize the FCC and influence media coverage in its favor, citing CBS's withdrawal of "Inside CECOT" as an example. According to the authors, media companies changed their programming and editorial practices under pressure to avoid government retaliation and to gain opportunities and concessions from the administration, including government contracts and regulatory rulings to their advantage. In the article, correspondent Scott Pelley remarked, "There was a thumb on the scale for the president's version of events."

== See also ==
- The Hooded Man - Photograph taken of an inmate at the Abu Ghraib prison during the Iraq War, similarly reported on by 60 Minutes at the time
- La Question - 1958 book precisely describing the methods of torture used by French paratroopers during the Algerian War
- J.G.G. v. Trump, Lawsuit challenging US deportations under the Alien Enemies Act
- Deportation in the second Trump administration
- Immigration detention in the United States
- Donald Trump's conflict with the news media
- Controversies involving ICE and private businesses

== Works cited ==
- Alfonsi, Sharon; Weiss, Bari (ch. ed.); Staff, 60 Minutes (eds.) (January 19, 2026). Inside Cecot. "Minneapolis, Inside CECOT, Salties | 60 Minutes Full Episodes". 60 Minutes. CBS News (CBS). Television production from 60 Minutes's channel on YouTube.
