= ICE recruitment during the second Trump administration =

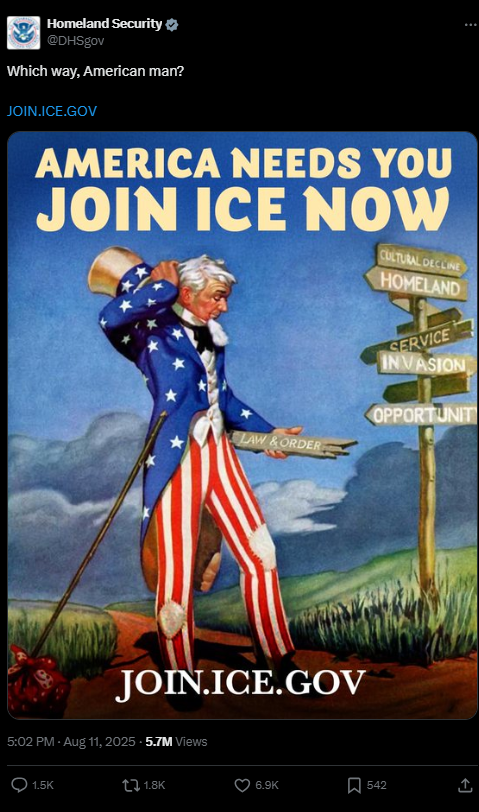
ICE recruitment tweet by DHS account on August 11, 2025

During the second presidency of Donald Trump, the United States Immigration and Customs Enforcement (ICE) significantly increased recruiting efforts. They are attempting to hire 10,000 new employees in 2026, up from 20,000 employees in December 2025, and have allocated $100 million in one year to what they have referred to as a "wartime recruitment" campaign.

The Department of Homeland Security (DHS) and the White House have posted recruitment ads to TikTok, X, and Instagram, and they purchased ad space to promote ICE on Hulu, HBO Max, Snapchat, Spotify, and YouTube. Their recruitment efforts have used memes and online influencers to promote ICE deportations, and they have used a geotargeted advertising targeting people who attended UFC fights, listened to patriotic podcasts, or had shown an interest in guns and tactical gear. Some ads used white nationalist slogans.

== Background ==
ICE is a federal law enforcement agency under the Department of Homeland Security, that was formed to uphold the mission of "[p]rotecting America through criminal investigations and enforcing immigration laws to preserve national security and public safety." The organization was created after the September 11, 2001 attacks as part of a major government reorganization, along with the DHS, US Customs and Border Protection, and the US Citizenship and Immigration Services.

One of Donald Trump's second term campaign promises was to crack down on illegal immigration, and as president, his administration has pursued a deportation policy generally described as "maximalist", and as a "mass deportation" campaign, involving the detention, confinement, and expulsion of hundreds of thousands of suspected illegal immigrants and their family members. Trump also signed several executive orders related to immigration such as declaring a national emergency at the US-Mexico border, ending the process of "catch and release" for illegal immigrants and suspending all refugee admissions to the US. On January 23, 2025, ICE began to carry out raids on sanctuary cities, and the Trump administration reversed the policy of the Biden administration to give ICE permission to raid schools, hospitals and places of worship. By January 2026, politicians, journalists, and scholars have increasingly called ICE a paramilitary force.

== Recruitment ==
DHS announced in the summer of 2025 intent to recruit and hire more than 10,000 deportation officers, using a "wartime recruitment" tactic according to internal memos. ICE officials allocated about $100 million over one year to recruit new agents.

Sarah Saldaña, the former director of ICE during the Obama administration, said that ICE used to fill open positions primarily through local police departments and sheriff's offices, but now they are hiring untrained recruits eager for combat. She said the mentality of trying to recruit as many agents as possible "tends to inculcate in people a certain aggressiveness that may not be necessary in 85 percent of what you do."

== Training ==
Newly hired ICE law enforcement personnel receive their training at the Federal Law Enforcement Training Centers (FLETC) in Glynco, Georgia. Prior to 2025, ERO Officer trainees had to complete the basic 13-week ERO academy. In 2025, Enforcement and Removal Operations (ERO) training was cut in half to run eight weeks, with training six days a week, Spanish-language courses were eliminated and academy training reduced to 47 days allegedly owing to Trump being the 47th president. In January 2026, The Intercept reported on a hiring binge with "shorter training, looser requirements, and flashy bonuses", leading to evidence of incompetence on display, as in humiliating "videos of agents falling down and dropping their guns" going viral on social media.

Slate journalist Laura Jedeed applied to ICE in order to learn about their application process. Jedeed reported that her interview took six minutes, stating that they only asked basic questions like her name, date of birth, whether she had military or law enforcement experience, and her reasons for leaving the armed forces. She wrote that the recruiter told her "the goal is to put as many guns and badges out in the field as possible." Jedeed remarked that she then received a "tentative offer" instructing her to fill out follow-up forms, which she ignored. Jedeed then took a drug test shortly after using cannabis, even though it is classified as a Schedule I drug under the Controlled Substances Act and therefore illegal federally. According to the journalist, ICE subsequently formally offered her a job, which she turned down.

In February 2026 a former ICE teacher, specializing in legal counsel in 2021 and based in the Georgia training center spoke to congressional Democrats and alleged that new agents were being trained to run over constitutional rights. DHS has denied his allegations that one two-hour program was cut to 10 minutes with a shoe horned lesson about the Fourth Amendment. Other courses about legal search and seizures, the use of force and limits of an officers authority had all been condensed reportedly to hire more officers.

In early May 2026, it was reported that the accelerated training had been abandoned and the Department of Homeland Security had plans to certify and dispatch veteran officers to the field to give additional instruction to those trained in the accelerated model.

== White nationalism allegations ==
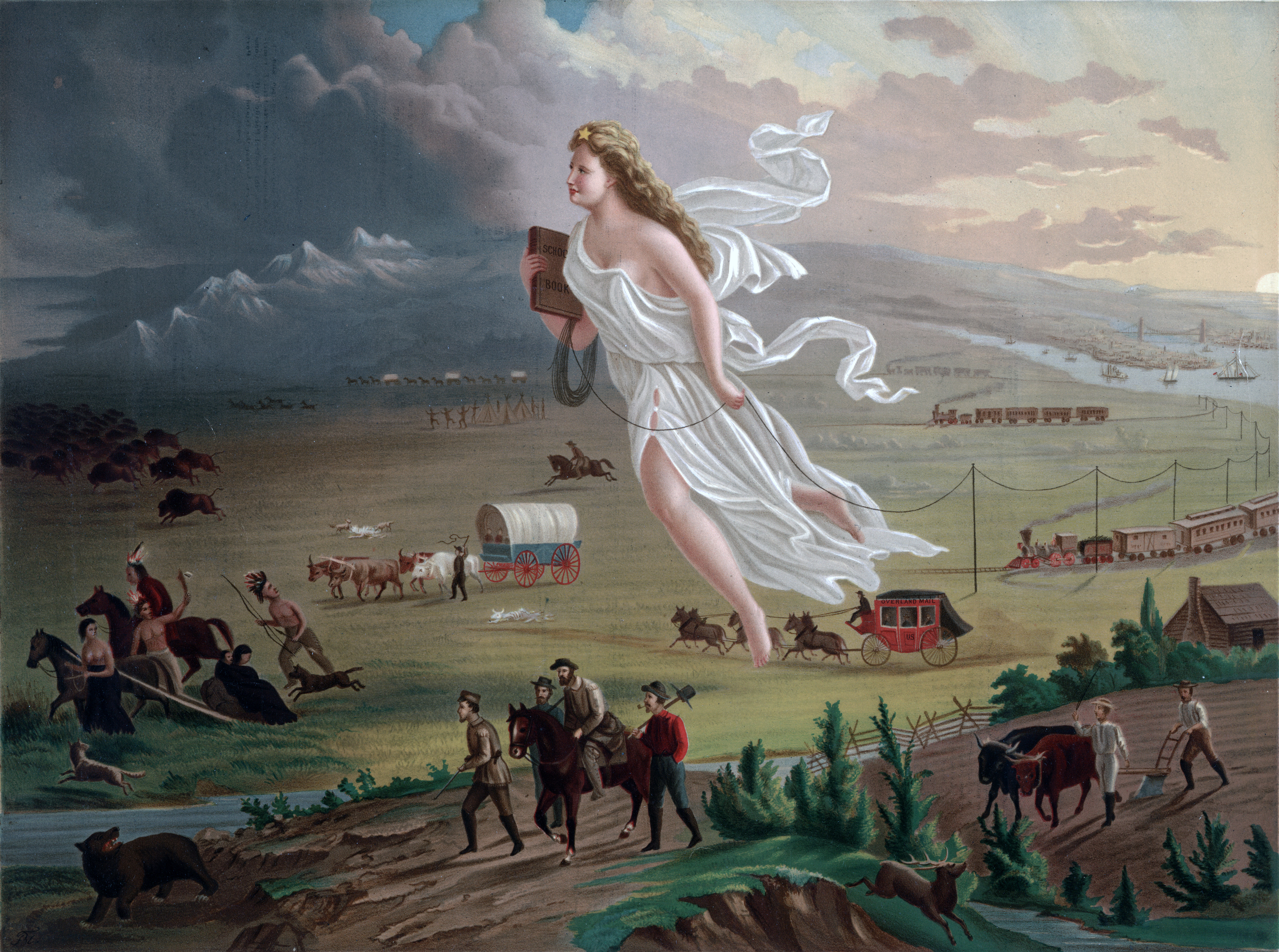
Manifest Destiny painting used in ICE recruitment ad with the slogan "A Heritage to Be Proud Of, a Homeland Worth Defending"

ICE's aggressive and meme-heavy publicity campaign was run by political appointees in their 20s, and received criticism from political commentators and scholars for being unprofessional and intentionally cruel. The campaign noticeably re-used WWII-era US propaganda posters, several of which had text that suggested the goal of deportations was to protect American culture, and several of which were accused of promoting white nationalism by scholars and historians or were previously promoted by far-right accounts. The Southern Poverty Law Center found the DHS using "white nationalist and anti-immigrant images and slogans in recruitment materials" for ICE and that some "images and language appear to come directly from antisemitic and neo-Nazi publications and a white Christian nationalist website."

One ad shared by the White House featured the phrase "We'll Have Our Home Again", which was also the name of a song produced and popularized by white nationalist group the Pine Tree Riots. The ad was also captioned "We'll Have Our Home Again", and had "join.ice.gov" written at the bottom of the image.

Two other ads were publicized, one for ICE recruitment captioned "Which way, American man?", and the other captioned "Which way, Greenland man?", which referred to the Greenland Crisis. A connection was drawn by NBC news to Which Way Western Man?, a book published by American neo-Nazi activist William Gayley Simpson and used by white nationalist groups that praises Adolf Hitler. The title of the book is a popular internet meme among the neo-Nazi movement. When asked about the slogan by Politico, White House spokesperson Abigail Jackson accused the Politico journalist of being a "deranged leftist who claims everything they dislike must be Nazi propaganda."

Another used the slogan "One Homeland. One People. One Heritage." One Rutgers University professor drew a parallel with the Nazi slogan "One people, one realm, one leader."

== Additional controversies ==
Some ICE recruitment videos used musicians' songs without their consent. ICE has also used AI-generated images for recruitment. In one ad targeting police officers, they attacked sanctuary cities: "You took an oath to protect and serve, to keep your family—your city—safe. But in sanctuary cities, you're ordered to stand down while dangerous illegals walk free."

Approximately 15,000 federal law enforcement workers have been reassigned to work on immigration enforcement, as have state police and other state-level officials—25,320 government officials total.

In October 2025, Homeland Security posted a recruitment ad featuring graphics from the Halo video game franchise with the text "Destroy the Flood. Join.ICE.gov," referencing the Flood, a monstrous parasitic alien species and major villain of the series. Microsoft, who owns Halo, declined to comment on the posts. Marcus Lehto, co-creator of Halo, described the post as "absolutely abhorrent." Jaime Griesemer, a chief designer in the series, denounced the ad, saying "the Flood are evil space zombie parasites and are not an allegory to any group of people." PC Gamer noted that the implicit comparison between immigrants and non-human life evokes parts of the dehumanization campaigns of the Holocaust and Rwandan genocide.

In October 2025, Spotify was criticized for running recruitment advertisements for ICE after receiving $74,000 from the Department of Homeland Security.

In January 2026, Spotify confirmed ICE ads are no longer running on their platform after the government advertising campaign ended. Later that month, the advocacy group Indivisible sent a public letter to Spotify's new CEOs calling on the company to pledge to stop running ICE ads going forward.

== See also ==
- Use of copyrighted works by the second Trump administration
- Deportation in the second Trump administration#Media campaign
- United States Immigration and Customs Enforcement#Publicity campaign
