= MVM, Inc. =

American private security contractor

- Type: Private company
- Founded: 1979
- Headquarters: Ashburn, Virginia, United States
- Key people: Kevin Marquez, CEO
- Services: Security contractors, staffing, training
- Website: mvminc.com

MVM, incorporated as M V M, Inc., is an American company headquartered in Ashburn, Virginia, United States. It is a private security contractor that provides security contractors, staffing, training, translation, and related services to U.S. government clients including being a contractor for detaining children who are subject to immigration proceedings.

== History ==
=== Foundation ===
Dario O. Marquez, Jr., a former United States Secret Service agent and two other former agents co-founded MVM in 1979. From 1984 through 2015 Marquez was the company's president and CEO. In 2015, Marquez sold his interest in MVM to his son, Kevin Marquez, formerly the company's chief operating officer.

In the 1980s, MVM was awarded a contract by the U.S. Department of State to supply Cleared American Guards (CAG) to U.S. embassies throughout the world. Following the 1991 Haitian coup d'état and subsequent reinstatement of Haitian President Jean-Bertrand Aristide in 1994, MVM became the first private American firm to protect a foreign head of state in his own homeland.

Following the September 11th attacks, MVM received contracts from the United States Army and the U.S. Justice Department. MVM continues work on these contracts as well as contracts with agencies incorporated into the Department of Homeland Security.

In 2018, MVM won a contract from the FBI to conduct classified research for its High-Value Detainee Interrogation Group.

== Contracts ==
MVM currently holds multiple multimillion-dollar contracts with multiple U.S. government agencies, including the Justice Department, Immigration and Customs Enforcement (ICE), State Department, United States Marshals Service, the Washington, D.C. Public Schools system, and the Federal Bureau of Investigation.

Among these is a $162 million contract with ICE to transport unaccompanied minor migrants. In July 2018, it was reported that MVM used a Phoenix, Arizona office building to provide unaccompanied minors shelter during the previous three weeks despite not being zoned for human occupancy or having a state license to serve as a child care facility. According to ICE, it was for those "awaiting same-day transport with a more comfortable and private atmosphere than they might otherwise have at a public transportation hub".

In July 2020, it was reported that MVM was taking unaccompanied migrant children to three Hampton Inn & Suites hotels in Arizona and at the Texas-Mexico border (McAllen, El Paso and Phoenix), where they were typically detained and then expelled from the United States. In April 2020, at least 29 children were detained at the hotels, some with multiple stays. In May, 80 children were detained. In June 2020, 120 were detained.
