= Alligator Alcatraz =

Former immigration detention facility in Florida, US

South Florida Detention Facility (Alligator Alcatraz)
- Detainees in Housing Units inside the South Florida Detention Facility on January 21, 2026

- Location in the United States Location in Florida
- Location: Dade-Collier Training and Transition Airport, Big Cypress National Preserve, Ochopee, Florida, U.S.; 25°51′42″N 080°53′49″W
- Status: Lawsuits pending
- Security class: Immigration detention center
- Capacity: 2,000 (max capacity)
- Opened: July 3, 2025
- Closed: June 16, 2026
- Managed by: Florida Division of Emergency Management in partnership with the U.S. Department of Homeland Security

The South Florida Detention Facility, nicknamed Alligator Alcatraz, was an immigration detention facility located on historical Native American lands at Dade-Collier Training and Transition Airport inside Big Cypress National Preserve in Ochopee, Florida, United States. The Florida Division of Emergency Management detained non-citizens under Immigration and Customs Enforcement authority from July 2025 to June 2026 at an estimated cost of at least US$1.4 billion in unnegotiated contracts. Multiple media outlets have reported that several no-bid private businesses also made campaign donations to Ron DeSantis' PACs and Attorney General James Uthmeier.

The facility received significant media attention during August 2025 due to its moniker, unique remote environment, political marketing effort, and references to concentration camps. The Governor of Florida, Ron DeSantis invoked a standing immigration "state of emergency" to seize a county-owned airfield and fast-track construction without the usual environmental reviews or the traditional collaboration with local officials, including Native American tribal leaders. On July 1, 2025, President Donald Trump and DHS secretary Kristi Noem attended a press conference on site, before the arrival of non-citizens on July 3. The Florida Legislature voted against the use of emergency funds for immigration issues on February 17, 2026. In June 2026, all detainees had been transferred to other facilities and the private businesses requested to vacate the camp, before evaluation of the environmental impact.

Criticism and lawsuits continue for the desecration of ancestral lands, inhumane conditions faced by detainees, its environmental impact, contractor campaign financing, lack of due process or order of removal, erosion of human rights, medical neglect, costly missteps, funding, and removing people to a third country without the third country's approval. Human rights organizations and legal experts say the camp did not meet the minimum standards of human treatment required for persons detained under international law due to the declared absence of sanitary facilities, medical care and access to legal advice with potential violations of the International Covenant on Civil and Political Rights (ICCPR) and the United Nations Convention Against Torture (UNCAT). An OIG report released in September 11, 2026 by the Inspector General of the Department of Homeland Security Office revealed widespread violations of detention standards, severe overcrowding, and unprecedented punitive practices, including small outdoor metal enclosures, across immigration detention sites in South Florida, including the Everglades camp. This OIG and other reports indicate that agents routinely placed people in outdoor cages the size of a telephone booth.

== Location ==
Located in the Everglades, the Big Cypress area was historically occupied by various cultures of Native Americans; the descendants include the federally recognized Miccosukee Tribe of Indians of Florida and the Seminole Tribe of Florida. The construction of a new Miami Jetport began on site in 1968 as Everglades Jetport. In 1969, Marjory Stoneman Douglas, author of The Everglades: River of Grass, founded Friends of the Everglades. Construction was halted in 1970 due to efforts of Native Americans including Buffalo Tiger, hunters, environmental concerns related to the Big Cypress Swamp and the cancellation of the 2707 Boeing program. By that point, one 10,500-foot (3,200 m) runway was built, the facility occupying 39 square miles (100 km^{2}).

Following continued efforts to federally protect the area, Big Cypress National Preserve became one of the first national preserves in the United States National Park System on October 11, 1974. According to Miami-Dade County Mayor Daniella Levine Cava, since 2019, the federal and state governments had previously invested well over $10 billion in Everglades restoration and protection. The Big Cypress National Preserve provides the Miccosukee, Seminole and Traditional people with permanent rights to occupy and use the land in traditional ways. In addition, they have first rights to develop income-producing businesses related to the resources and use of the preserve, such as guided tours.

Big Cypress National Preserve was designated a DarkSky International park in 2016; the nation's first preserve to achieve "dark sky" status.

== History ==
=== Background ===
During his second tenure, President Donald Trump and his administration pursued what Trump called for "huge camps" where migrants would be held prior to deportation.

=== Opening ===
On June 19, 2025, the "Alligator Alcatraz" was announced, which sources later officially named the "South Florida Detention Facility". According to the U.S. Immigration and Customs Enforcement website, the official name is the "Florida Soft Sided Facility South". Signs outside the camp indicated "Alligator Alcatraz" as the name. The Florida Division of Emergency Management and the governor's office bypassed procurement and competitive bidding rules to rapidly install the site. Private companies, many who donated to Republican candidates, obtained no-bid contracts to set up the camp. Florida International University employees were instructed to covertly deliver university-owned equipment on June 27.

IRG Global Emergency Management, who had given $10,000 to Florida's Republican Party on June 24, 2025, was awarded a $1.1 million contract for operational support services, followed by two more contracts at the Ochopee site. IRG is an offshoot of Access Restoration Services US, Inc., a major campaign donor to DeSantis and totaling nearly $400,000 in donations to Republican coffers. The Critical Response Strategies (CRS) company initially received a $78 million no-bid contract from Florida emergency funds for staffing and some communications with lawyers. Carlos Duart, president of CDR Companies, formaly CDR Maguire, and Tina Vidal-Duart had donated $1.9 million to the Republican Party of Florida and two political action committees supporting DeSantis when the company was contracted, without bidding, for site construction. CDR Enterprises also made a $250,000 donation to Friends of James Uthmeier on Sept. 17, 2025, on top of a previous $25,000 contribution. CDR Health, run by Tina Vidal-Duart, was also awarded $17.5 million for its role in the facility, according to the Florida Accountability and Contract Tracking System (FACTS).

During the opening press conference on July 1, 2025, Trump and Noem joined DeSantis, ICE Director Todd Lyons, FDEM Director Kevin Gutherie and other Florida officials. After migrants arrived on July 3, the press was forbidden to enter the site. Trump said the compound "might be as good as the real Alcatraz," adding it's "a little controversial, but I couldn't care less." Desantis repeated in July 2025 that all detainees had a final removal order, which Eunice Cho of the ACLU stated is "clearly inaccurate".

=== Moniker ===
The moniker alludes to both the local American alligator population and the former maximum-security Alcatraz Federal Penitentiary. In American slang, alligator bait or gator bait is a racial slur for African Americans, implying they are worthless and expendable. Whatever the intentions, the moniker echoes a long tradition of using alligators in ways that have reinforced racist imagery and dehumanizing stereotypes according to Historian Mark V. Barrow, Jr. of Virginia Tech. In 1919 the Florida Department of Agriculture and Florida State Live Stock Association explicitly discouraged any references to "alligators lying in wait for pickaninnies", describing them as harmful for the image of the state and against the commercial interests of its citizens. In 2020, the University of Florida decided to end the "Gator Bait" chant during athletic events due to "horrific racist imagery" associated with the phrase. The high-security Alcatraz Federal Penitentiary housed convicted criminals and was by far the most expensive prison in the United States, and many still perceived it as America's most extreme jail.

=== "The box" cage ===
Small metal cage, nicknamed "the box"

Within weeks of its opening, a Nicaraguan migrant seeking U.S. asylum reported to WLRN that guards put him into what they called "the box", a four-by-four-foot square enclosure outside in the sun and heat, for several hours, with no water and his hands and feet painfully shackled. Rebecca Sharpless, director of the Immigration Clinic at the University of Miami, confirmed a similar account from a young man shackled in an outside cage the size of a vending machine. Such practices are associated with the death of Marcia Powell at the Arizona State Prison Complex – Perryville. In March 2026, Senators Jon Ossoff and Dick Durbin, Senate Minority Whip and ranking member of the Senate Judiciary Committee, initiated an investigation of the use of shackles and 'the box'. Amnesty International denounced the camp's cruel, inhuman and degrading treatment, including the use of the 'box' in December 2025. In September 2026, the Inspector General of the Department of Homeland Security Office confirmed the practice of guards placing people in 4 × 4 foot outdoor metal cages at the camp and at other sites in South Florida.

=== Runway ===
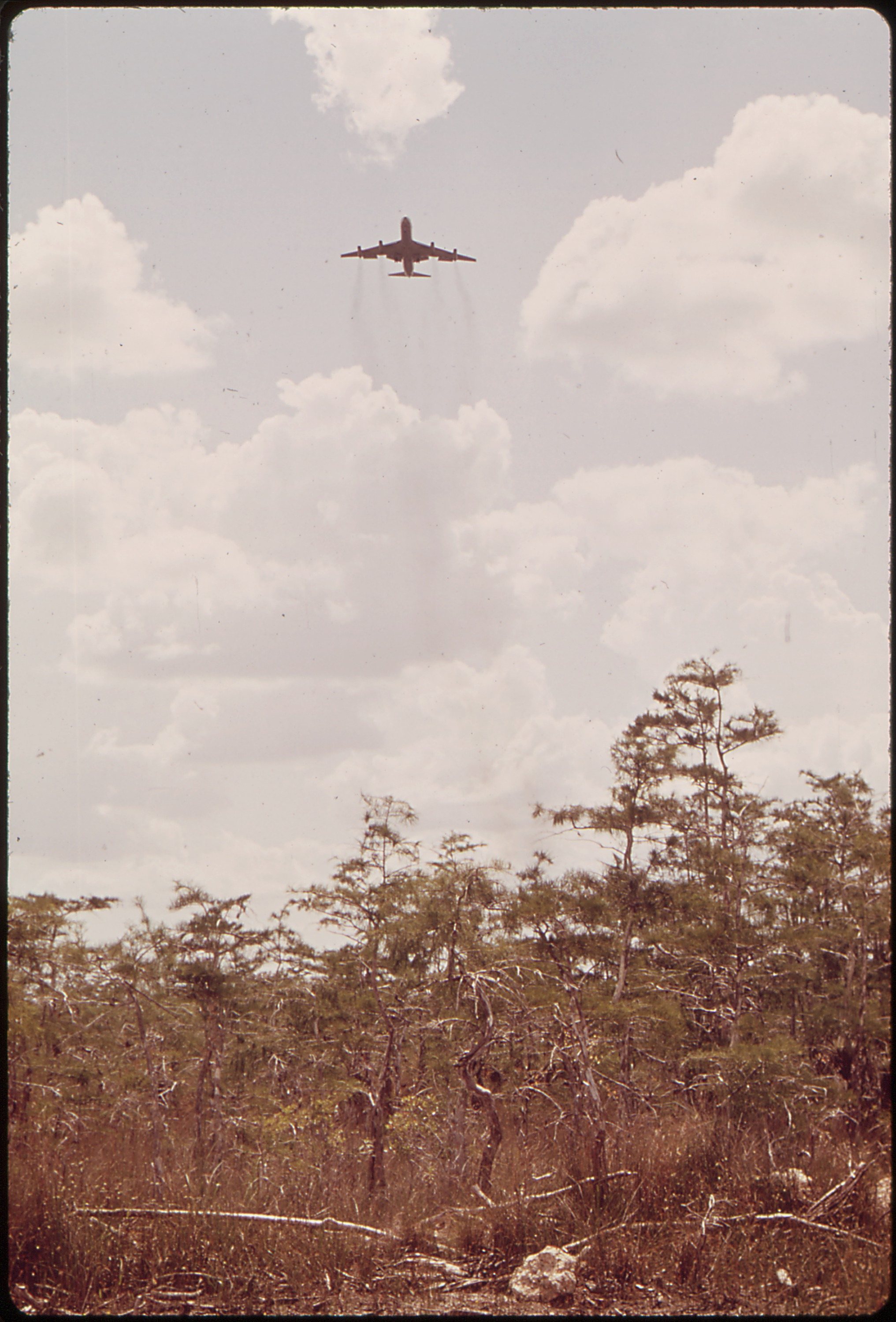
Takeoff of an airplane at the Everglades Jetport, July 1972

DeSantis said the airstrip would serve as a "one-stop" shop using the on-site runway for deportation. Data from the Miami Herald and Tampa Bay Times show it was used as a holding pen and transfer hub for immigrants still fighting their cases in immigration courts. State officials said deportation flights began immediately after opening with a "surge" of immigration arrests, an ICE spokesperson answering, "Fire up the deportation planes." Flights included shuffle flights (in between US facilities), removal flights to a foreign country, and removal related flights (fuel stops and connections), with 50 such flights in 2025 and 108 flights between January and May 2026. Shuffle flights increased in June 2026. Court documents note deportations from the center included noncitizens of Mexico transported to the Mexican border, although Mexico refused their legal entry.

=== Closure ===
On June 16, 2026, DHS officials indicated that all detainees had been transferred to undisclosed locations. Florida Emergency Management Director Kevin Guthrie instructed private businesses to remove tents, fences, trailers and other structures from the site, thus initiating a "full demobilization" of the facility and leaving 20 acres of asphalt added without permit to the original 35 acres. Following this declaration, Miami-Dade Mayor Daniella Levine Cava said her administration would explore transferring county-owned land at the site to the National Park Service or other Everglades restoration partners. In July 2026, a federal judge requested proof from DeSantis that the camp was closed in the context of a lawsuit brought by the American Civil Liberties Union's National Prison Project.

Friends of the Everglades, Inc. v. Mullin (previously v. Noem)
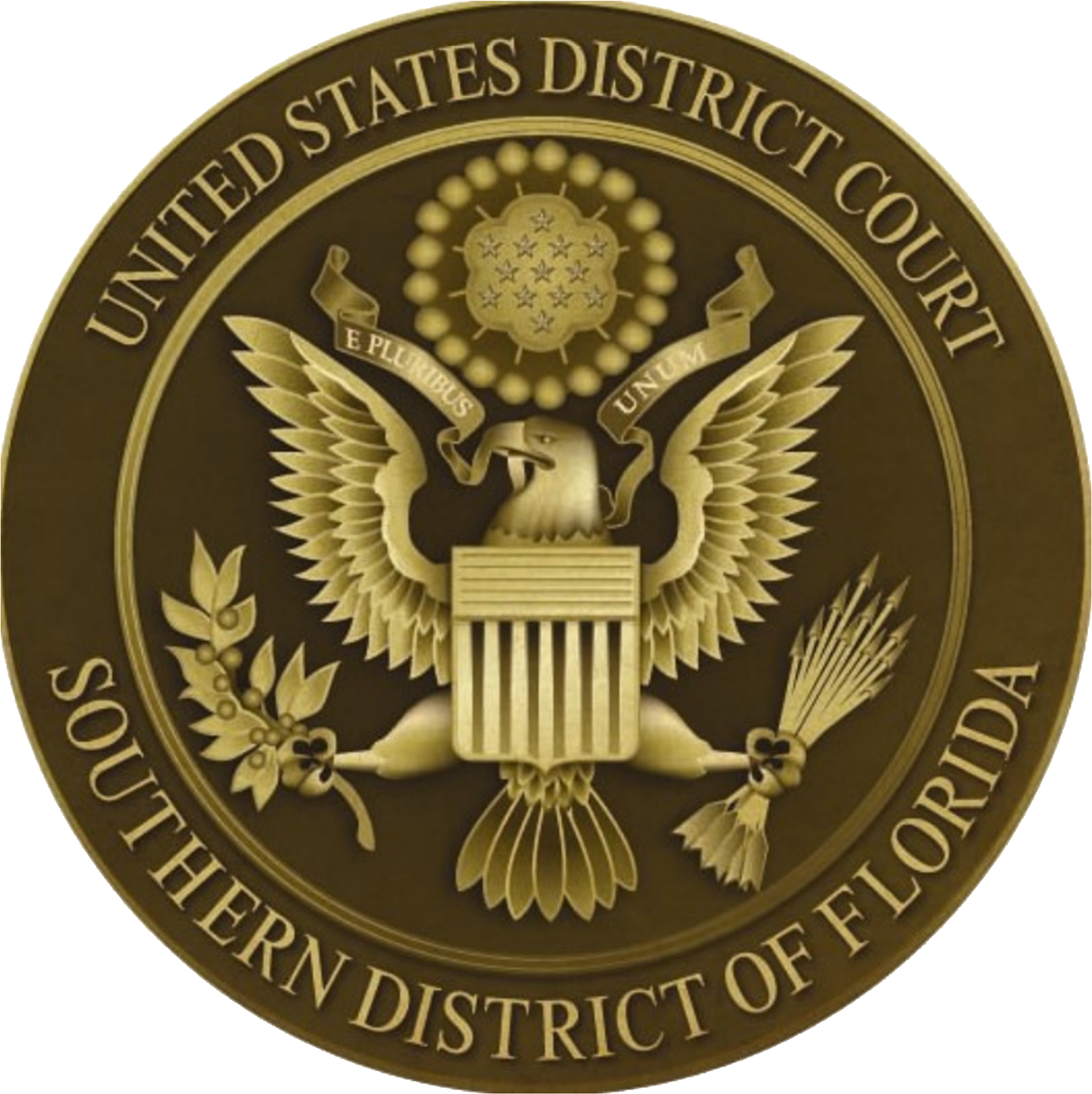
- Court: Southern District of Florida
- Full case name: Friends of the Everglades and Center for Biological Diversity v. MARKWAYNE MULLIN,1 in his official capacity as Secretary of the UNITED STATES DEPARTMENT OF HOMELAND SECURITY; TODD LYONS, in his official capacity as Acting Director of the UNITED STATES IMMIGRATION AND CUSTOMS ENFORCEMENT; ROBERT J. FENTON, in his official capacity as Senior Official Performing the Duties of Administrator for the FEDERAL EMERGENCY MANAGEMENT AGENCY; DOUG BURGUM, in his official capacity as Secretary of the Interior; BRIAN NESVIK, in his official capacity as Director of the U.S. Fish and Wildlife Service; KEVIN GUTHRIE, in his official capacity as Executive Director of the Florida Division of Emergency Management; and MIAMI-DADE COUNTY, a political subdivision of the State of Florida. Initial defendents: Kristi Noem; Todd Lyons; Kevin Guthrie, Executive Director of the Florida Division of Emergency Management; and Miami-Dade County
- Started: July 27, 2025; 15 months ago
- Docket nos.: 1:25-cv-22896 (S.D. Fla.); 25-12873 (11th Cir.)

Case history
- Prior actions: the Miccosukee Tribe of Indians of Florida accepted as plaintiffs on July 30, 2025.; temporary restraining order granted on August 7, 2025 for 14 days by Kathleen M. Williams; preliminary injunction granted on August 21, 2025 by Williams; Williams' preliminary injunction stayed on September 4, 2025 by Barbara Lagoa, joined by Elizabeth L. Branch, on Court of Appeals for the Eleventh Circuit. Adalberto Jordan dissented.; preliminary injunction vacated on April 21, 2026 by William H. Pryor Jr., joined by Andrew L. Brasher, on Eleventh Circuit. Nancy Abudu dissented.; amendment of August 12, 2026 claims that state and federal officials kept key federal funding information from judges to avoid the National Environmental Policy Act.
- Appealed to: United States Court of Appeals for the Eleventh Circuit

Court membership
- Judge sitting: Kathleen M. Williams

Keywords
- National Environmental Policy Act; Administrative Procedure Act; Endangered Species Act; Water Resources Development Act; National Park Service Organic Act; Cypress National Preserve Addition Act

According to the Amendment filed by Friends of the Everglades on August 12, 2026, the interventions on site continue after shuttering to cause direct and indirect harm to the wetlands, wildlife, and air and water quality through lighting, noise, vehicle traffic, pollution, fencing, paving, demobilization activities, and other wildlife habitat disturbances, which degrade the natural, scenic, hydrologic, floral, and faunal, and recreational values of the area (see: Friends of the Everglades, Inc. v. Mullin).

== Detainees ==
C.M. v. Noem
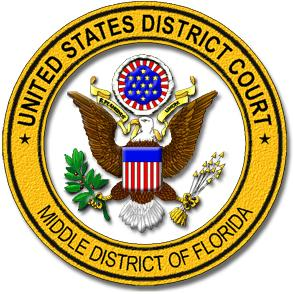
- Court: Middle District of Florida
- Full case name: C.M., Michael Borrego Fernandez, J.M.C., E.R. on behalf of themselves and all others similarly situated v. Kristi Noem, Secretary of the United States Department of Homeland Security, in her official capacity; U.S. Department of Homeland Security; Todd Lyons, Acting Director and Senior Official Performing the Duties of the Director of U.S. ICE, in his official capacity; Garrett Ripa, Field Office Director for ICE's Enforcement and Removal Operation's ("ERO") Miami, Florida Field Office, in his official capacity; Ronald DeSantis, Governor of the State of Florida, in his official capacity; Sherea Green, Director of the Corrections and Rehabilitation Department of Miami-Dade County, Florida, in her official capacity; Kevin Guthrie, Executive Director of the Florida Division of Emergency Management, in his official capacity; Florida Division of Emergency Management; Sirce Owen, Acting Director of EOIR, in her official capacity; Executive Office for Immigration Review.
- Started: July 16, 2025; 16 months ago
- Docket nos.: 2:25-cv-00747

Case history
- Prior actions: Class provisionally certified and preliminary injunction issued on March 27, 2026

Outcome
- Dismissed as moot on August 14, 2026

Court membership
- Judge sitting: Sheri Polster Chappell

Keywords
- First Amendment; Fifth Amendment

According to ICE data as of April 2026, the center held nearly 1,400 detainees, all men, and two-thirds of those detained were classified as noncriminal. The first group of detainees arrived on July 3, 2025. Director Kerner testified that "detainees were there solely on immigration violations, none on state criminal charges." A review of official records revealed that people detained at the facility included Deferred Action for Childhood Arrivals recipients and persons on student visas, including Hari Koneru from India whose lawyer Anna Weiser declared he does not have an order of removal.

Detained people have included husbands of US citizens, including those seeking asylum or attending United States Citizenship and Immigration Services greencard interviews. Also detained were fathers of US citizen children, including those with a greencard or a current or expired Temporary Protected Status. Justo Betancourt, the Cuban single father of US citizen, Arianne, spokesperson of The Workers Circle, which organised the weekly vigils outside the gates was released after six months of detention when his attorneys proved he was wrongfully detained. He was congratulated for his release by Trump.

According to a list of the population obtained by the Tampa Bay Times and Miami Herald in mid-July, more than 95% of the detainees held at the site originated from Latin American countries. Approximately 20% of the population are Guatemalan citizens, ~20% Mexican citizens, and another ~10% Cuban citizens. The New York Times reported that non-citizens from Cuba have been detained at the camp and deported at record numbers, including those seeking the right of asylum. Green card holder Douglas Dixon, one of at least two Canadians detained at the camp, declared, "They're treating people like animals. Alligator Alcatraz is like (Nazi) Germany in 1939, updated with 2026 rules." South African of TV reality show and former lawyer, Peet Viljoen, who previously praised Trump and echoed claims about so-called "white genocide" in South Africa, was detained on a charge of aggravated grand retail theft and later transferred to the California City Detention Facility.

In October 2025, The Miami Herald, as well as detainees' family and lawyers, reported that the whereabouts of about two-thirds of over 1,800 detainees held at the facility in July could not be determined. The average stay of the 21,000 persons detained on site was 16 days.

== Court-ordered release or bond hearing ==
=== Court-ordered immediate release ===
On April 1, 2026, Judge Sheri Polster Chappell of the US District Court of the Fort Myers Division ordered the immediate release of Noel Traba Ramirez, who had filed for asylum from Cuba, esteeming that "ICE clearly exceeded its statutory authority when it designated him for expedited removal." Following his petition for Writ of Habeas Corpus, Judge Polster Chappell ordered, on April 9, 2026, the immediate release of Jose Alberto Molina, a native of Cuba who was paroled into the United States in 2004. U.S. District Judge Kyle Dudek also referred to Habeas Corpus when ordering Justo Betancourt's release from ICE custody within 48 hours on May 13, 2026. On May 15, 2026, Adrian Cambara Ortiz, originally from Cuba, was also immediately released by the United States District Court, Middle District of Florida, Fort Myers Division, after five months of detention.

Senior United States Judge John E. Steele ordered the immediate release on May 18, 2026 of the Cuban-born Jose Miguel Bello Valdez and of Gabriel Antonio Perez Romero, on June 3, 2026, citing their refusal of deportation to Mexico and the US Supreme Court case Zadvydas v. Davis. The Cuban-born Gabriel Antonio Perez Romero was initially detained in November 2025 by ICE during a regularly scheduled reporting appointment and taken to the San Ysidro, San Diego port of entry in January 2026, before court-ordered release. Of Cuban origin, Ricardo Rodriguez refused to cross the Mexican border in February and April 2026, before court-ordered release in June 2026.

When ordering the immediate release of Alejandro Osvaldo Ghysels Reales, a recipient of a U visa for victims of crimes (and their immediate family members) who have suffered substantial mental or physical abuse while in the U.S. and who are willing to assist law enforcement and government officials, U.S. District Judge Kyle C. Cohen noted, "The Government simply scooped up a man protected by an active grant of deferred action, locked him in a cell, and submitted a brief to this Court that pretends the protection does not exist".

=== Bond hearings ===
On July 23, 2025, the bond hearing of green card holder and U.S. permanent resident since 2000, Gonzalo Almanza, father of an 8-year old US citizen, was abruptly cancelled without notice, a pattern reportedly affecting other detainees. On May 11, 2026, U.S. District Judge Dudek found that plaintif Omar Felipe Suarez Reye is not entitled to immediate release but is entitled to a bond hearing for release. On May 13, 2026, Tomas Rubio Rincon, who arrived from Mexico over twenty years ago, was ordered to be immediately released or granted a bond hearing within ten days for release, in accordance with the Immigration and Nationality Act.

Vargas Sergi lawfully entered the US from Venezuela in 2015 and applied for asylum in 2016. Married and the father of two children, he has an authorization to work. ICE arrested him in April 2026 and an immigration judge denied his release during a bond hearing citing traffic tickets, a possible boat-registration issue and a "danger to the community". A court ordered his immediate release in June 2026 judging that he is neither a flight risk, nor a danger to the community.

== Reports of inhumane treatment ==
Detainees reported harsh conditions at the facility, citing limited access to water, insufficient food, and restrictions on the practice of their religion. Detainees have described unsanitary conditions, including wastewater overflows and insect infestations, as well as inadequate access to medical care. The area on which the facility is located is also subject to frequent bouts of extreme weather, including yearly hurricanes, heavy rainfall, and high heat.

On July 21, The Guardian described the facility, as well as Krome and a Miami jail, as being at the center of "a succession of alleged abuses at jails operated by Immigration and Customs Enforcement Agency (ICE) in the state since January, chronicled by the advocacy groups Human Rights Watch, Americans for Immigrant Justice, and Sanctuary of the South from interviews with detainees". A month later, the outlet described reports of inhumane treatment and brutality at the camp as being commonplace.

On July 22, people detained on site began a hunger strike to protest what they consider to be inhumane and dangerous living conditions. Some detainees reported maggots in the food and having to "dig the fecal matter out of the toilets with their bare hands" for lack of plumbing. The Florida Division of Emergency Management has denied the claims, but no independent inspections have been allowed.

On August 29, three detainees said an uprising occurred at the facility in phone calls to Miami's Spanish language news channel Noticias 23. The incident allegedly occurred after several detainees shouted "freedom" after one received news a relative had died. The detainees described guards as indiscriminately beating detainees with batons and firing tear gas. The Florida Division of Emergency Management denied reports that the events had occurred.

In December 2025, the report "Torture and Enforced Disappearances in the Sunshine State: Human Rights Violations at 'Alligator Alcatraz' and Krome in Florida" published by Amnesty International concluded that the camp's conditions, including routine and prolonged use of shackles and retention in a "box" described as a cage-like structure "constitutes torture".

In 2026, an investigation over reports of abuse at the Everglades tent facility was filed by U.S. Senators Jon Ossoff of Georgia and Dick Durbin of Illinois, focusing on allegations of torture. After an unannounced visit in April 2026, Congresswoman Debbie Wasserman Schultz stated, everything about this detention camp "screams inhumane and unnecessary." Controversy continues related to possible federal funding for this first state-run facility within the context of immigration to the United States and deaths during ICE detention.

The Miami Herald's review of one year of emergency calls to 911 by concerned family and friends detail a lack of medical attention within the camp and a lack of communication about medical emergencies.

In September 2026, a DHS Office of Inspector General report said the site used "small metal enclosures" covering 18 square feet that presented "significant risks" to detainee's health and safety as "calming areas."

== Construction and operational costs ==
The total cost for the facility before dismantlement was estimated in June 2026 by CBS News Miami to be $1.2 billion or over $3,500 a day per detainee. According to the United States Government Accountability Office, ICE neglected standard practice by not entering into a contract or intergovernmental service agreement or negotiate costs with the state of Florida for the camp, leading to high operating costs. Florida officials initially announced a cost of US$450 million a year to operate.

Documents requested by Second Judicial Circuit Judge Angela Dempsey in March 2026 showed Florida had spent more than $1.2 million per day to run the camp, with a daily burn rate of $3 million a day during its earliest weeks. In July 2026, CBS News Miami calculated the average daily cost for the camp at $3.4 million.

Fewer than 70 Florida National Guard were on duty to guard the remote detention site. The private company GardaWorld was hired for security. U.S. Representatives Greg Stanton, Yassamin Ansari and Adelita Grijalva remain concerned that GardaWorld "does not appear to have experience constructing and operating immigration detention centers".

In early August 2025, the Federal Emergency Management Agency confirmed reception of a grant application from state officials, later evaluated as a US$1.49 billion grant. In August 15, federal officials provided the Florida Division of Emergency Management (FDEM) with instructions related to the use of US$608 million funds. As of August 29, 2025, the State of Florida had incurred $218 million of sunk costs for the construction of the facility. Its legality has been questioned by a coalition of 67 members of Congress, led by Jeff Merkley and Debbie Wasserman Schultz.

In August 2025, U.S. district judge Kathleen Williams granted a preliminary injunction halting construction and prohibiting the government from transferring any additional detainees to the site, which was later stayed by the Court of Appeals for the 11th Circuit allowing continued operations.

On December 30, 2025, Trump vetoed the bipartisan Miccosukee Reserved Area Act citing the immigration detention facility. The act would have transferred 30 acres of land in the Everglades to control by the Miccosukee Tribe of Indians.

State records show that $34 million in public dollars had been spent on technology and IT support by April 2026, when the Florida Division of Emergency Management said that adding phones as required by a judge, would cost $180,000 up front plus $6,000 weekly. The DEM also reported having spent millions of dollars in legal fees statewide for immigration detention over three years and hundreds of thousands of dollars on private jet flights to and from the facility and food products.

In February 2026, Florida House Republicans, led by Griff Griffits of Panama City Beach, introduced a successful bill, supported by Democrats, that prohibits the use of Florida emergency funding for the camp, reserving the funds only for natural disasters. According to Transparency Florida, a government accountability website, FDEM filed a budget amendment May 6 notifying payments of $45.3 million out of the Emergency Preparedness and Response Fund for invoices of the 2025–2026 year, before the bill passed in the Legislature. In total, FDEM has spent $458.5 million in emergency funds on immigration enforcement in the past financial year.

On May 7, 2026, The New York Times reported that federal and state officials were debating whether to close the facility owing to its high operational costs. It reported that a promised reimbursement worth $608 million by the federal government for Florida to run the facility for a year had not been received by Florida officials.

According to interviews published in the May 15, 2026 edition of the The San Juan Daily Star, some private vendors hired by the state for the site's operations struggled to front costs, as some invoices have not been paid in over 200 days. In September 2026, the DeSantis administration had paid out nearly $630 million to contractors, with about $812 million in outstanding balances.

== Legal challenges ==
=== Native American tribal rights ===
Miccosukee Tribe Chairman Talbert Cypress testified in a recent lawsuit that this is not the first time the tribe has had to fight for its land and rights, affirming, "we will always stand up for our culture, our sovereignty, and for the Everglades." There are 15 remaining traditional Miccosukee and Seminole villages, recognised as Indigenous people of the Everglades region, in Big Cypress, as well as ceremonial and burial grounds and other gathering sites, Cypress testified before Congress in 2024."We live here. Our ancestors fought and died here. They are buried here," he said. "The Big Cypress is part of us, and we are a part of it." The Seminole Tribe of Florida was likewise in opposition citing sacred lands.

Republican Representative Carlos Gimenez of Florida sponsored a bill in July 2025 which would have transferred 30 acres of land in the Everglades to control by the Miccosukee Tribe of Indians in order to avert "catastrophic flooding" and referring to the Miccosukee Tribe as "stewards of the Everglades". The Act reflected years of "bipartisan work and was intended to clarify land status and support basic protections for tribal members who have lived in this area for generations," wrote Chairman Cypress. According to Kevin Washburn, a law professor at University of California Berkeley Law, "It is rare for an administration to veto a bill for reasons wholly unrelated to the merits of the bill." Washburn added that while denying land return to a tribe is a political act, Trump's move is "highly unusual." On December 30, 2025, Trump vetoed the bipartisan Miccosukee Reserved Area Act citing the immigration detention facility.

The facility casts bright lights across sacred tribal lands where the Miccosukee people have conducted their annual Green Corn Ceremony for many generations. The intense illumination disrupts the tribe's spiritual practices and the delicate nocturnal ecosystem that depends on natural light cycles.

=== Environmental challenge and injunction ===
In June 2025, Betty Osceola, a Miccosukee tribal judge and member of the Everglades Advisory Committee, organized Indigenous-led prayer gatherings and public demonstrations to highlight environmental and cultural concerns. Talbert Cypress, chairman of the Miccosukee Business Council, noted that no environmental impact research had been done and that some Native villages were within 900 feet (270 m) of the camp's entrance. On June 23, 2025, Miami-Dade County Mayor Daniella Levine Cava wrote to the Florida Division and stated, "With the federal and state government investing well over $10 billion since 2019 in Everglades restoration and protection, we would appreciate a detailed analysis and report on environmental impacts of this facility to the Everglades."

On June 27, 2025, a coalition led by Friends of the Everglades, the Center for Biological Diversity, and the Miccosukee Tribe of Indians, represented by Earthjustice and attorney Paul Schwiep, filed suit in a federal court seeking an injunction until a full environmental review and public-comment period are completed. Plaintiffs argue that the project threatens the habitat of endangered species, including that of the Florida panther and the Florida bonneted bat, and violates both the National Environmental Policy Act (NEPA) and tribal cultural-resource protections.

On August 7, 2025, U.S. District Judge Kathleen Williams temporarily halted construction at the facility for two weeks, while she considered if the detention center violates environmental laws. Witnesses testified that 20 acres (8 hectares) of new asphalt had been laid, while temporary tents, trailers, and other heavy equipment were at the airport. Located in tropical wetlands, its infrastructure and sewage may be sources of both water pollution and light pollution.

Judge Williams later granted a preliminary injunction on August 21 that prohibits the government from transferring any additional detainees to the site or performing any more construction work. She also ordered the Trump administration to remove temporary fencing, industrial lighting, generators, sewage and waste receptacles from the site within 60 days. Uthmeier stated that they plan to keep the ICE facility running, despite the court order.

The U.S. Court of Appeals for the 11th Circuit, in a 2–1 decision early September, first stayed the injunction pending appeal, stating that because the federal government had yet to reimburse Florida's costs, federal law (the NEPA, which requires an environmental impact study) did not apply. The State's request for federal reimbursement had been submitted on August 7, 2025, which it did not inform the courts of. The Appellate Court granted a second stay, citing the government shutdown. On August 14, Friends of the Everglades filed suit to access Florida's undisclosed records of government financing for the camp under the Government in the Sunshine Act. In April 2026, the US Court of Appeals for the Eleventh Circuit ruled that the federal government could skip environmental review as the facility, considering it to be not "federally controlled", making it the first circuit court to rule on amendments Congress added to the National Environmental Policy Act in 2023.

Center for Biological Diversity v. Guthrie
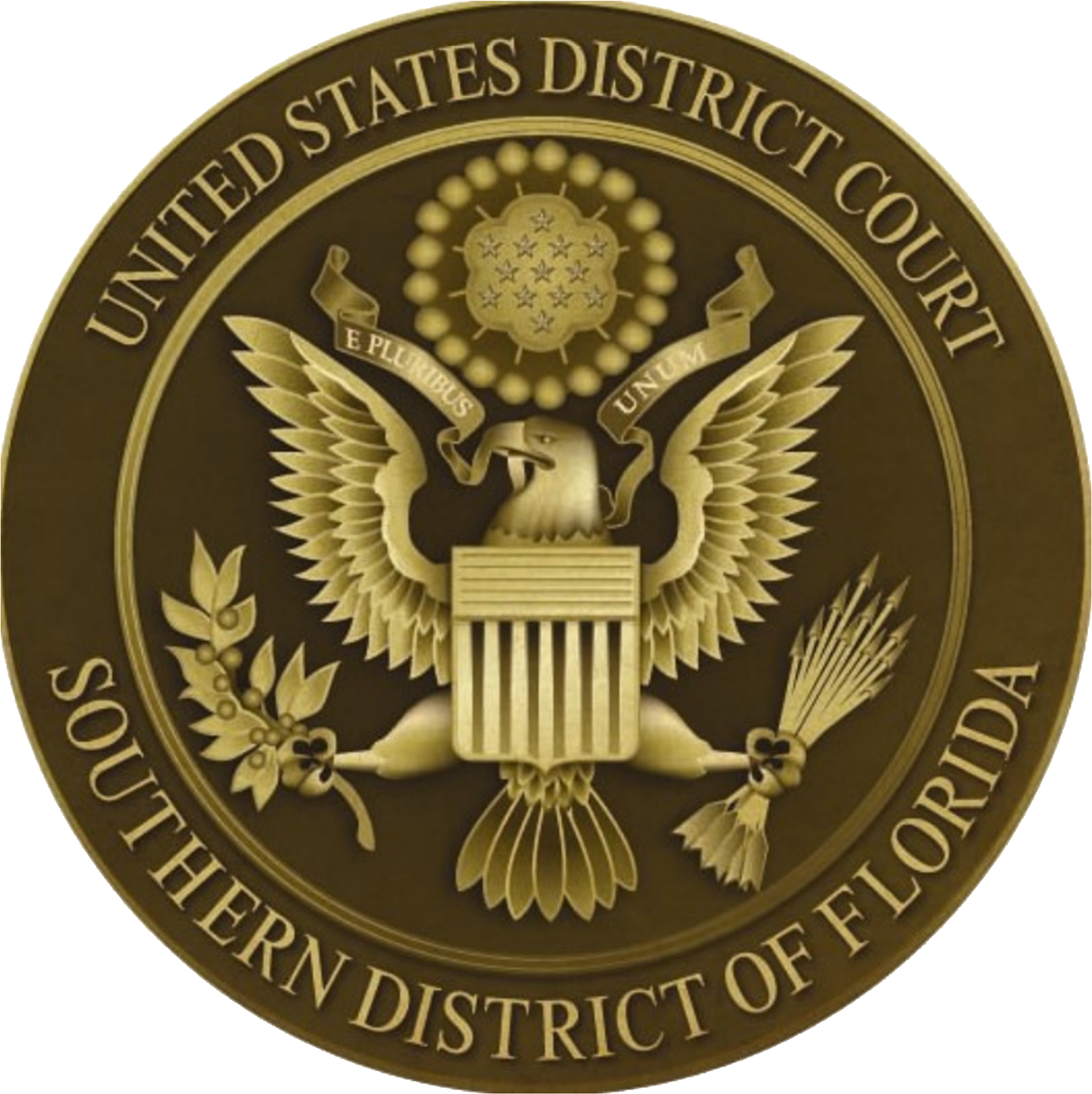
- Court: Southern District of Florida
- Started: May 27, 2026; 5 months ago
- Docket nos.: 1:26-cv-23710

Court membership
- Judge sitting: Federico A. Moreno

Keywords
- United States Clean Air Act

In March 2026, a state-commissioned environmental assessment report raised concerns about emissions of air pollutants exceeding regulatory thresholds of the Clean Air Act, including carbon monoxide and particulate matter from vehicle use and continuously running generators. On May 26, 2026, the Center for Biological Diversity filed a lawsuit for what it terms as "substantial, unpermitted pollution from diesel generators and other air-polluting equipment", that could lead to civil penalties for Florida of up to $124,426 per day of violation. The air pollutants harm human health and the environment, including benzene, formaldehyde, nitrogen oxides and particulate matter.

=== Civil liberties challenges ===
On July 16, 2025, the American Civil Liberties Union, the ACLU of Florida, and Americans for Immigrant Justice filed a class action suit claiming the Trump administration violates the First Amendment and Fifth Amendment rights of people being detained, as well as the First Amendment rights of legal service organizations and law firms with clients held at the facility. The civil rights groups' lawsuit alleges detainees are being held without charges and are not being given access to their attorneys. As part of this lawsuit that also contests the federal cancellation of bond hearings, U.S. District Judge Rodolfo Ruiz has requested all written agreements and contracts showing who has legal custody of the hundreds of detainees.

Immigration attorneys described the facility's alternate system as a place "where the normal rules don't apply." Gov. Ron DeSantis falsely stated on July 25 that "Everybody here is already on a final removal order," a lie repeated by his director of emergency management, Kevin Guthrie. Internal data show that the vast majority of detainees did not have final orders of removal from a judge before entering the facility (nearly 70% did not), but they may have been deported as the facility's population fell to below 400 late August.

In January 2026, a former detainee from the camp deported to Colombia and a second who had requested asylum was deported to Haiti both testified before a District judge that the camp agents did not respect their right to legal counsel guaranteed by the Sixth Amendment to the United States Constitution. In April, lawyer Katherine Blankenship accused state and federal officials of failing to comply with a federal judge's preliminary injunction allowing detainees to phone their lawyer. Blankenship also declared that camp guards severely beat and pepper-sprayed detainees.

== Public response ==
Critics compare the facility to Nazi concentration camps, referring to it as "Alligator Auschwitz" while others situate it within American concentration camps, including the internment of German Americans, the internment of Italian Americans, and the internment of Japanese Americans at Manzanar and elsewhere. Members of the Republican Party, including DeSantis, have defended the facility, arguing it will help the U.S. Immigration and Customs Enforcement (ICE) to cope with the deportation policy of the federal government. The camp has been labeled a "black hole" following the irregular disappearance of detainees. Alex Padilla, Dick Durbin and other Democratic U.S. Senators mentioned the camp in their open letter about the increase in deaths during ICE detention.

At a weekly vigil at the camp entrance on September 21, Amy Fischer, Director of Refugee and Migrant Rights at Amnesty International USA, called the facility "a human rights disaster." The organization launched a campaign to shut down the site on July 23 in response to unsanitary conditions, lack of medical care, and minimal access to lawyers, considering that it "sets a dangerous precedent for how states can partner with the federal government to expand the reach of its mass detention and deportation machine." "Amnesty International considers that detention conditions at both facilities amount to cruel, inhuman and degrading treatment. The use of prolonged solitary confinement at Krome and the use of the 'box' at "Alligator Alcatraz" amount to torture or other ill-treatment."

== Political responses ==
After the facility's announcement, the Republican Party of Florida marketed "Alligator Alcatraz" merchandise, including hats, shirts, and koozies, the state of Florida handed out merchandise to conservative influencers, and Attorney General James Uthmeier sold similar items to raise election cash. Critics found the fundraising pitch cruel and inaccurate as hundreds of people being held there are not facing any criminal charges and the facility could be described as a concentration camp. Florida state Representative Angela Nixon called it a "modern-day concentration camp", explaining, "Donald Trump's blueprint for America has now become barbed wire and broken families."

On July 2, Janelle Bynum, Maxwell Alejandro Frost and 22 other members of Congress wrote to Noem deploring that "detainees will be kept in tents with inadequate sanitation facilities and will face unbearable living conditions," including "exposure to deadly pathogens, constant threats from unpredictable flooding and extreme weather events, and daily temperatures averaging 90 degrees, with a heat index often over 100 degrees Fahrenheit."

In July, state Representative Anna Eskamani and state Senator Shevrin Jones joined lawmakers in suing DeSantis in order to gain access to the site. After their visit, they deplored the sanitary conditions, with Eskamani stating that the detention camp is "a political stunt with environmental damage and everyday lives being harmed. It needs to close immediately."

Following an on-site visit on July 12, Representative Debbie Wasserman Schultz described the detainees as "essentially packed into cages, wall-to-wall humans, 32 detainees per cage". During the same visit, Florida Rep. aría Elvira Salazar, who was able to enter a cage, said the center meets the "highest of standards". Congressional and state lawmakers on-site reportedly heard cries of libertad, meaning "freedom" in Spanish, from detainees. Lawmakers were not permitted to view the entire facility.

Representative Dan Goldman of New York, where ICE is a contentious topic, aided in the release of some 30 people on May 6, 2026, including at least one detained in the Everglades, stating, "our immigration system is being weaponized against those simply trying to follow the rules" and that he will "continue to use every tool in Congress to fight back and push for true accountability and reform."

Candidate Byron Donalds declared he would not investigate the camp's controversies if elected and would hire the contractors Critical Response Strategies, CDR Maguire and GardaWorld. For the 2026 mid-term elections, the GEO Group contributed $4.5 million to the Byron Donalds PAC. The GEO also partnered with CDR Health of CDR Companies, led by co-founder Carlos Duart – a former contractor at the now shuttered Alligator Alcatraz – to secure a promised $100 million contract from the state of Florida to manage the Baker Correctional Institution, nicknamed Deportation Depot, a state-run detention facility in North Florida.

=== Public opinion ===
Polling on July 4, 2025, by YouGov found that 48% of Americans polled opposed the detention center, with 33% supporting it and 18% unsure, while 53% of independents polled opposed the facility. In their poll on July 20, 28% of women and 42% of men approved the camp. A poll among Florida voters from July 25 to 27 found that 34% of Floridians held a favorable opinion and 59% saying they disapprove of using the state of Florida's taxpayer-funded Emergency Preparedness and Response Fund to cover costs.

== See also ==
- Immigration detention in the United States
- Environmental movement in the United States
