= Jennifer Davenport =

American attorney (born 1974/1975)

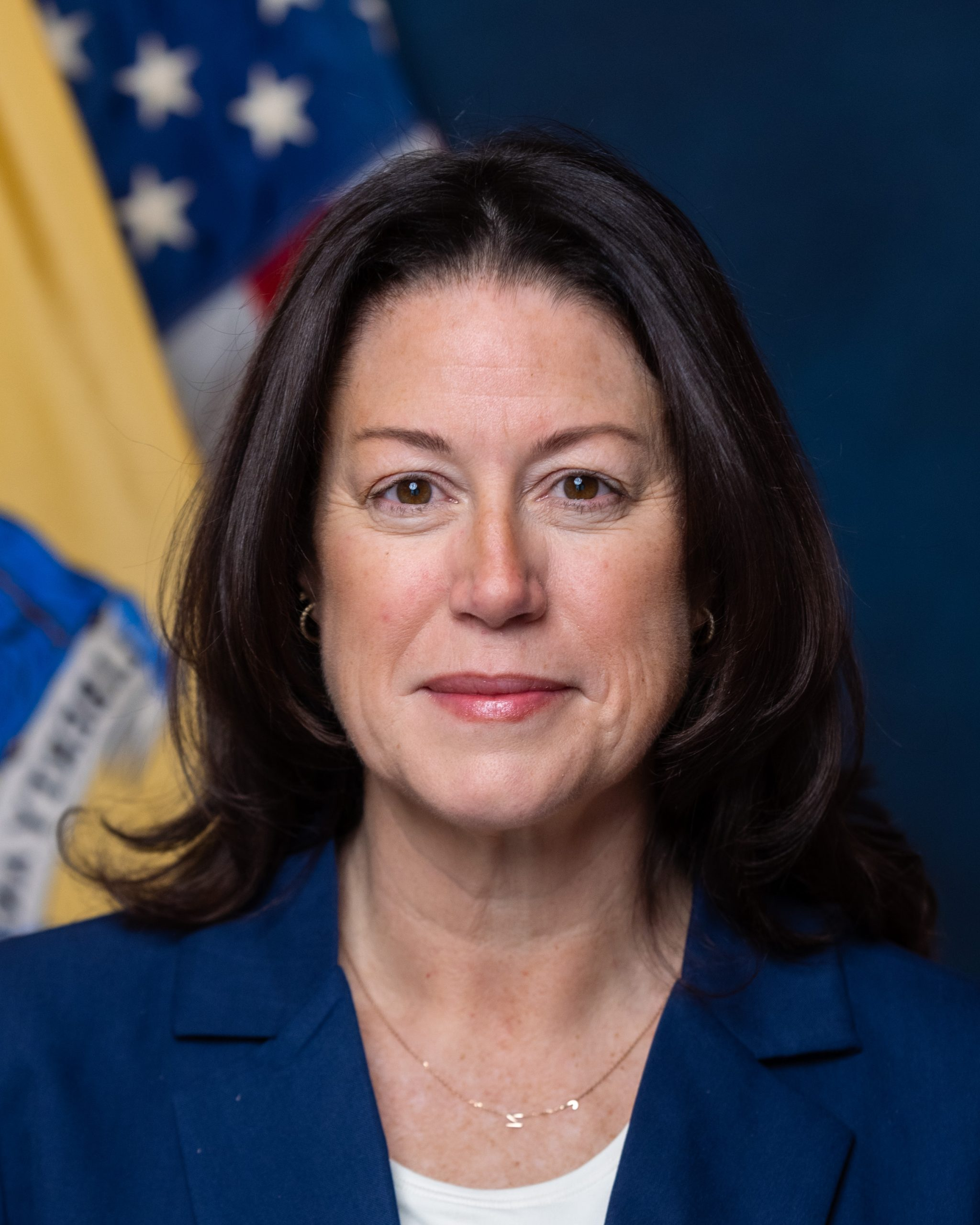
- Official portrait, 2026

63rd Attorney General of New Jersey
- Incumbent
- Assumed office January 20, 2026; Acting: January 20, 2026 – February 24, 2026
- Governor: Mikie Sherrill
- Preceded by: Matthew Platkin

Personal details
- Born: 1974 or 1975 (age 50–51)
- Party: Democratic
- Children: 2
- Education: DeSales University (BA); Seton Hall University (JD)

Jennifer Davenport (born 1974/1975) is an American attorney who has served as the Attorney General of New Jersey since 2026.

== Background ==
A native of Cape May County, New Jersey, Davenport attended DeSales University as an undergraduate and earned her Juris Doctor degree from the Seton Hall University School of Law. She was a law clerk for Judge John Winslow Bissell of the United States District Court for the District of New Jersey.

== Personal life ==
As of 2026, Davenport lives in Monmouth County, New Jersey. She has two daughters.

== Career ==
Davenport was an associate at Latham & Watkins and Squire Patton Boggs. She then worked as a prosecutor, including as an assistant United States attorney, as New Jersey division counsel in the Drug Enforcement Administration, and as First Assistant Attorney General of New Jersey. She then returned to private practice, becoming deputy general counsel for the Public Service Enterprise Group in 2022.

=== New Jersey Attorney General ===
On December 14, 2025, Governor-elect Mikie Sherrill nominated Davenport to be New Jersey Attorney General. She served in an acting capacity from Sherrill's inauguration on January 20, 2026, to February 24, 2026, when she was unanimously confirmed to the post by the New Jersey Senate.

==== Delaney Hall ====
Davenport has played a role in the state's arrests of protesters and journalists during the 2026 Delaney Hall protests. At a May 29, 2026 press conference, she said:

Left to right:
- Protesters and "protest zone" shortly before dispersal orders
- NJSP order protesters to disperse under threat of arrest
- NJSP throw tear gas at protesters, May 29

Let me make this clear: violence either against protesters, or by protesters, is unacceptable and it is not who we are. Increased escalation and increased ICE presence won't make anyone safer. As Governor Sherrill said, we need to do everything we can to lower the temperature and de-escalate the situation. Which is why, to protect the public and safeguard the right to protest, our state police will be taking public safety operations over from ICE outside Delaney Hall this afternoon. As part of their efforts, the state police is creating clearly-demarcated areas outside Delaney Hall to ensure that people can protest safely and peacefully."

Later that day, Governor Sherrill ordered New Jersey State Police (NJSP), in collaboration with the Newark Police Department (NPD) and ICE, to take over operations outside Delaney Hall for ICE and establish a "peaceful, protected protest zone" for protesters to go inside in an attempt to "cool things down." The protest zone created by police was a 600-yard (550 meter) enclosure outside the facility consisting of orange interlinked metal bicycle parking rack fences and concrete blocks. The protest zone was characterized by some protesters and journalists as a cage.

NJSP arrest a protester during the protests, May 31

After arrests were made later that night, Davenport accused protesters of throwing tear gas canisters at police prior to when dispersal orders were issued, which The Nation characterized as "a plainly ludicrous claim, since no protester would have been able to procure tear gas ahead of the action."

On May 30, a police officer allegedly stole a journalist's camera equipment at the protests. Davenport publicly announced criminal charges against the officer allegedly responsible for the alleged theft.

On May 31, additional arrests were made against 61 protesters and journalists, who were all charged with felonies. Three of them, including a journalist, were hospitalized, and Reporters Without Borders characterized the government's actions that night as "repression typical of an authoritarian regime." After the arrests, Davenport issued a statement thanking police for "de-escalating" the situation and saying those arrested had been "armed" with helmets, shields, and gas masks.

Legal offices
Preceded by Matthew Platkin	Attorney General of New Jersey; 2026–present	Incumbent
