= 2026 Delaney Hall hunger strike and protests =

Protests at immigrant detention facility in Newark, New Jersey

Delaney Hall hunger strike and protests
- Part of the 2026 U.S. immigration enforcement protests and authoritarianism during the Trump presidencies
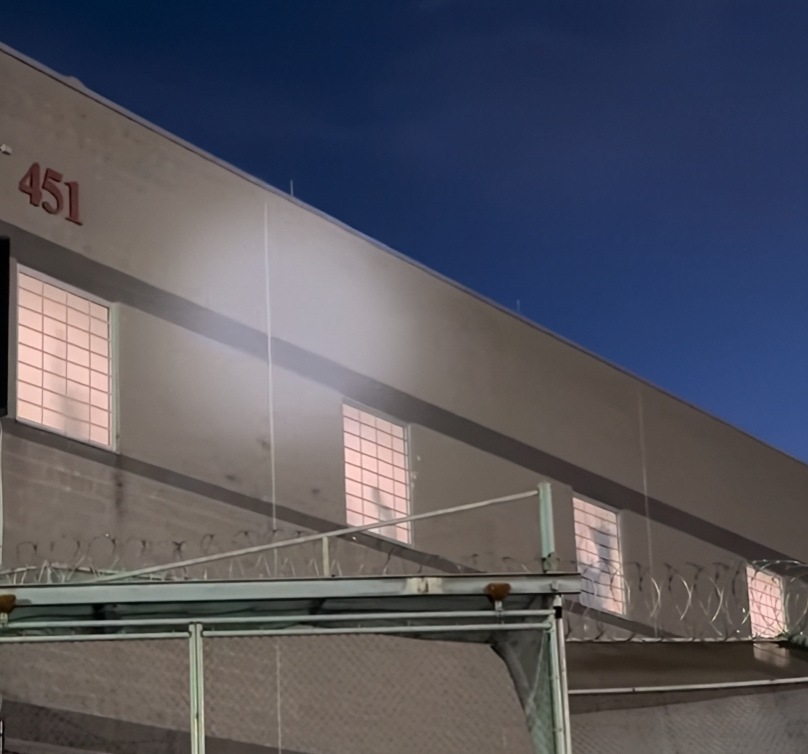
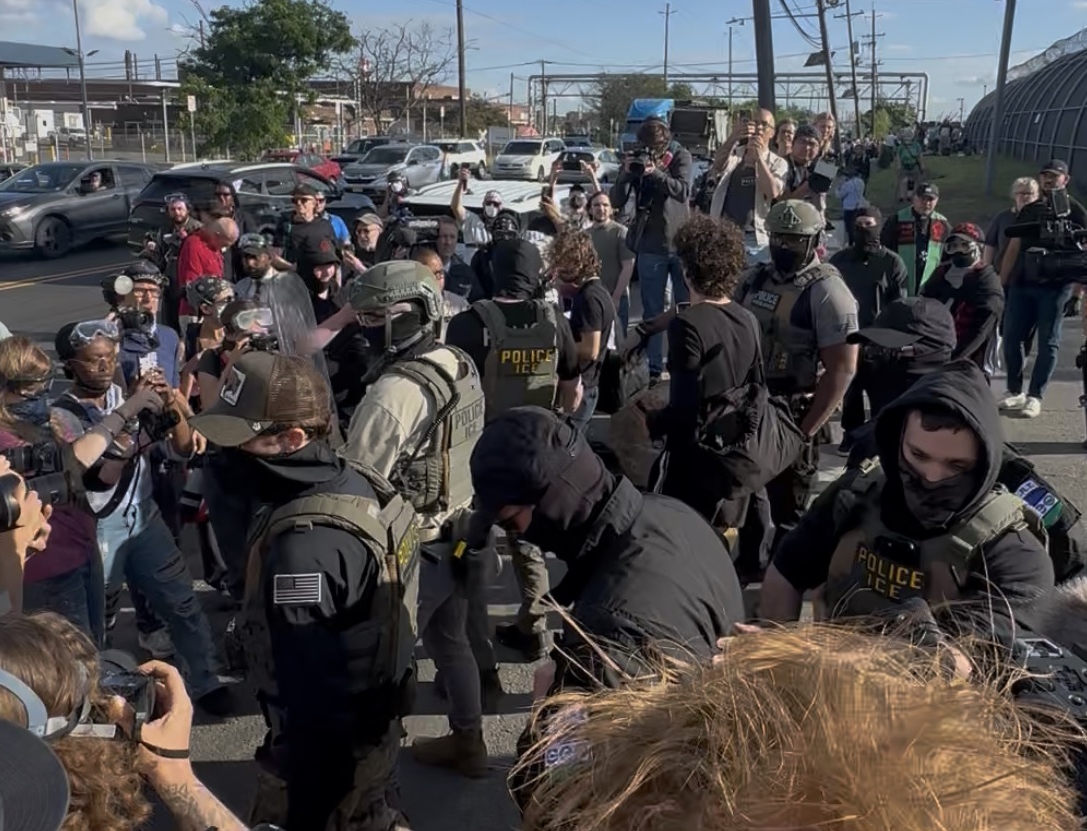
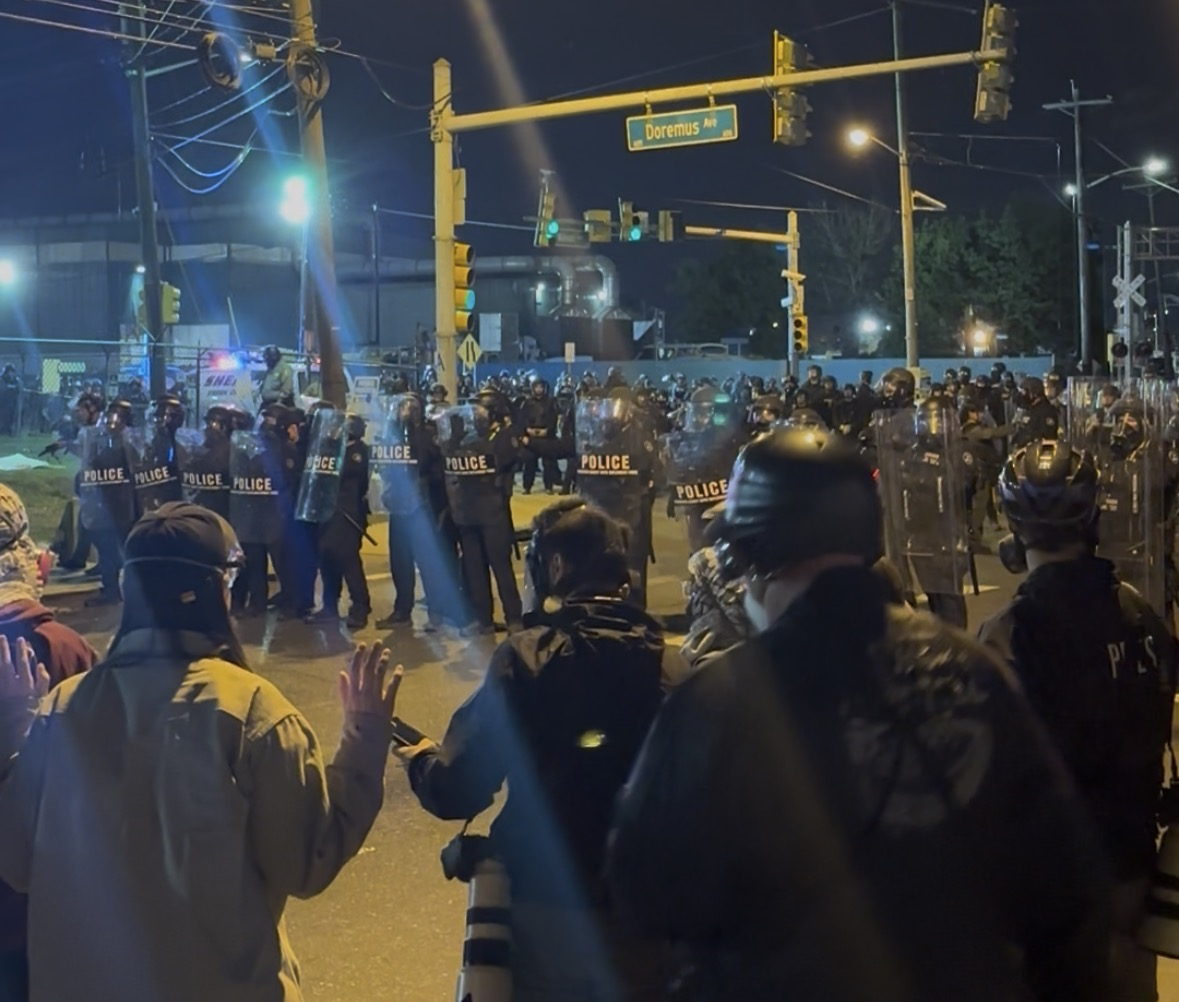
- Banner drop outside the facility, May 28; Detainees wave at protesters from windows, May 25; ICE agents outside the facility, May 28; NJSP riot police outside the facility shortly before kettling and arresting protesters and journalists, May 31, 2026
- Date: Strike: May 22, 2026 – June 22, 2026; Protests: May 22, 2026 – present
- Location: Newark, New Jersey, United States
- Goals: Immediate release of all detained people, especially the elderly, pregnant, young, and those with serious medical conditions; A meeting with New Jersey governor Mikie Sherrill; Improved facility conditions; Habeas corpus for immigration hearings, allowing people to pursue their immigration cases outside of detention; End of coercive pressure for detainees to "self-deport"
- Methods: Detainees: Hunger strike, labor strike Protesters: Sit-in, picketing, human chains, personal protective equipment, face masks, black bloc, obstructing ICE vehicles, makeshift shields, makeshift barricades, traffic cone method Law enforcement and GEO Group: Riot police and riot shields, tear gas, flash grenades, batons, pepper spray, pepper balls, rubber bullets, tasers, plastic handcuffs, horseback police, face masks, barricades, curfew zones, solitary confinement, kettling, armored vehicles, vehicle-ramming attacks, SWAT teams, FBI knock and talks, undercover police, targeted surveillance, police body cameras, aerial drones, facial recognition AI, targeting of press

Parties
United States federal government; DOJ; FBI; DHS; ICE; GEO Group; Counter protesters; MAGA movement; Proud Boys	New Jersey government; Newark government; NPD; Department of Law and Public Safety; NJSP; Essex County sheriff's office	Anti-ICE protesters; Strikers in Delaney Hall; American Left; Black blockers; Progressives; Elected officials; Advocacy groups; Cosecha; Eyes on ICE; North New Jersey DSA; NJ Alliance for Immigrant Justice

Lead figures
Republicans; Donald Trump; Tom Homan; Markwayne Mullin	Democrats; Mikie Sherrill; Jennifer Davenport; Ras Baraka	Inside; Martin Soto; Outside; Gabriela Soto; Andy Kim

Casualties and losses
None	None	Arrests: 90+ Charges: Disorderly conduct, felony resisting arrest and rioting

On May 22, 2026, in Newark, New Jersey, immigrants detained in Delaney Hall, a private prison run by GEO Group used for holding immigrants detained by Immigration and Customs Enforcement (ICE), held a month-long hunger and labor strike protesting conditions inside the facility. Detainees were allegedly given expired food with worms or mold, sleep on the floor in overcrowded rooms, have been denied medical care for serious conditions, and have reportedly been abused by guards. Protests and civil unrest outside the facility in support of the strikers quickly escalated, resulting in over 90 arrests. Conditions inside the facility worsened, with reports of batons, pepper spray, and tear gas being used against strikers and multiple ambulances arriving at the facility throughout the strike. The strikes ended due to actions taken by guards to intimidate, segregate, and discipline strikers, such as by putting strike leaders in solitary confinement, threatening to force-feed strikers, and transporting strikers to unknown facilities around the country.

Some black bloc protesters blocked ICE vehicles from entering or exiting the facility. ICE agents attacked protesters and journalists with batons, pepper spray, and tasers, in many cases singling out and detaining protesters or pushing protesters into oncoming traffic. Local officials including Governor Mikie Sherrill (D) were denied access to the facility, and Senator Andy Kim (D) was pepper sprayed by ICE while trying to de-escalate.

Governor Sherrill ordered the New Jersey State Police (NJSP) to take over operations outside the facility for ICE, and she also established "protest zones" for protesters to move inside, while Newark mayor Ras Baraka (D) established an overnight curfew surrounding Delaney Hall. Riot police were then repeatedly deployed and used batons, pepper spray, tear gas, flash grenades, rubber bullets, horseback police, SWAT teams, armored vehicles, and undercover police to disperse, kettle, arrest, and criminally charge protesters who refused to leave, with many journalists being injured and arrested.

The Department of Homeland Security (DHS) has characterized protesters as being outside agitators and rioters, saying "There is NO hunger strike at Delaney Hall. There are NO subprime conditions or abuse at the facility." Governor Sherrill accused some protesters of being from "national extremist groups" without naming specific groups, and Mayor Baraka has criticized both protesters and police, saying the police's actions were "in some cases, unconstitutional." Municipal, state, and federal actions have sparked significant backlash from the political left and advocacy groups. Reporters Without Borders characterized the government's actions as "repression typical of an authoritarian regime."

== Background ==
Delaney Hall is a facility used for immigrant detention in Newark, New Jersey, United States. The private prison is managed by the GEO Group under contract for U.S. Immigration and Customs Enforcement (ICE), which awarded GEO Group a US$1 billion contract for 15 years. Delaney Hall previously held immigrant detainees from 2011 to 2017. The facility re-opened in 2025 and has an authorized capacity of up to 1,196.

It is the largest facility of its type on the East Coast of the United States and the largest of the two in New Jersey, the other being the Elizabeth Detention Center. Both facilities are located near Newark Liberty International Airport and are used for the entire New York metropolitan area. It is located in an industrial area of Newark, neighbored by a natural-gas plant, a sewage-treatment facility, and an animal-fat–rendering plant amongst other facilities.

On May 9, 2025, a confrontation and subsequent skirmish between law enforcement and four Democratic politicians occurred at Delaney Hall, an immigration detention center in Newark, New Jersey, United States.

Ras Baraka, the mayor of Newark, was arrested and charged with trespassing, but the charges were later dropped. LaMonica McIver, one of the three U.S. representatives from New Jersey involved, was later charged with three counts of assaulting or interfering with a federal officer. McIver rejected the charges as an attempt at political intimidation.

On June 12, 2025, following days of Delaney Hall detainees complaining about unacceptable conditions and lack of food, a small uprising occurred and four people escaped the facility after breaking through a sheet-rock interior wall. Two of the men were recaptured after three days. The third was captured shortly after, and the fourth was recaptured on July 18. Following the unrest, around 50 women were transferred from Delaney Hall to El Paso, Texas, where they were held in a tent-like facility opened in 2023.

In December 2025, 41-year-old Jean Wilson Brutus died while in custody at Delaney Hall. According to ICE, "On Dec. 11, 2025, Brutus entered ICE custody. He had no signs of distress during intake nor a medical history of cardiovascular issues." Roughly one day after arriving at Delaney Hall, ICE said that Brutus suffered a "medical emergency". He was brought to University Hospital in Newark, where he was pronounced dead. The reason for death has been described inconclusive.

== Facility conditions ==
Selenia Destefani, the managing attorney and CEO of Nova Law Group which represents Delaney Hall detainees, said "The conditions are brutal [...] People just sleep on the floor — overcrowded rooms, cold showers, no food, extremely cold in the cells with no blankets," which is corroborated by inmates. Alex Minogue, another attorney at Nova Law Group, says detainees with medical conditions such as cancer and diabetes are not provided medical care. Nova Law Group employees and letters released by inmates also claimed that food is being served expired, moldy, or with worms in it, and that disease was persistently spreading within the facility. In one letter, hundreds of detainees expressed desperation to get out of Delaney Hall, "offering to leave the country by any means just to escape the conditions inside" according to the Rolling Stone. According to activists, 10 complaints have been made against one specific guard, who continues to work inside the facility, who allegedly sexually assaulted female detainees. On watch dog report said the recent closure of the facility's dining hall "forces prisoners to eat all three meals while perched on their beds or foot lockers in their cramped cells, which at 70 square feet are less than half the size of a parking space."

Detainees also play a role in maintaining the facility in exchange for roughly US$1 per day.

The United States Department of Homeland Security denied allegations of maltreatment or poor living conditions in the facility, saying "No lawbreakers in the history of human civilization have been better treated than illegal aliens [in Delaney Hall]." Department of Homeland Security (DHS) secretary Markwayne Mullin defended facility conditions, saying "This isn't Holiday Inn."

On May 28, 2026, New Jersey health inspectors were allowed to tour Delaney Halls's kitchen and food storage areas and reported, "Overall sanitation and physical condition of the production kitchen and warehousing areas were observed to be satisfactory and free from signs of rodent or vermin activity at the time of this inspection." They also said "it is impossible to form an accurate assessment and make a reliable evaluation" without full access to Delaney Hall and emphasized parts of the report found that food temperatures were not appropriate.

== Timeline ==
=== May 22: Day one of hunger strike ===
On Friday May 22, around 300 people inside Delaney Hall announced a joint labor and hunger strike. The hunger strike was led by Martin Soto, who since his arrival in the facility, has been placed in solitary confinement (referred to by ICE as "disciplinary segregation") as a result of being the leader of the strike, Martin was arrested months prior while buying diapers for his kids. NJ.com reported that as they spoke to Martin, he rolled up his sleeve and showed them purple and yellow bruises on his right arm, swelling on his wrists, and scrapes on his ankles, which he said was caused by rough handling by ICE agents and handcuffs that were too tight. Martin also said his chest hurt, likely as a result of a heavy chain that had been wrapped around his body by ICE agents.

Martin's wife, Gabriela Soto, started a small protest outside the facility. Gabriela said "I am four months pregnant, and my husband isn't there [...] He missed my daughter's fourth birthday. He missed our son's first birthday. He missed my son's first steps." According to NJ.com, "It all quickly snowballed from there." There have been ongoing protests outside the facility along with people waiting to see relatives who are detained. A tent had been set up for the prior year outside the facility to support the families of detainees by advocacy group Eyes on ICE. Gabriela claimed she saw ICE agents slam Martin against a window after the strike and protests started.

The goals of the protesters include the immediate release of all detained people, especially the elderly, pregnant, young, and those with serious medical conditions; a meeting with New Jersey governor Mikie Sherrill; improved facility conditions; Habeas corpus for immigration hearings, allowing people to pursue their immigration cases outside of detention; and an end to coercive pressure for detainees to "self-deport."

In the year leading up to the strike, Newark mayor Ras Baraka said the protests outside Delaney Hall had been peaceful until in the days following the strike, "a sharp and troubling shift occurred. ICE increased its presence and engaged protesters in ways that escalated tensions and led to unnecessary confrontation," which was corroborated by Slate. Journalists and protesters from across the country arrived at Delaney Hall in the following days, including people who took planes and trains from other states. But most protesters were from New Jersey or New York State, since Newark is close to the border of New York. Members of the Democratic Socialists of America, specifically its North New Jersey chapter, mobilized to support protests outside the facility shortly after the strike began.

=== May 25: Government official pepper sprayed ===
External May 25 footage
- Detainee released from facility reunites with family — Status Coup
- Senator Andy Kim pepper sprayed — News 12
- "Radical hospitality zone" tent — Status Coup

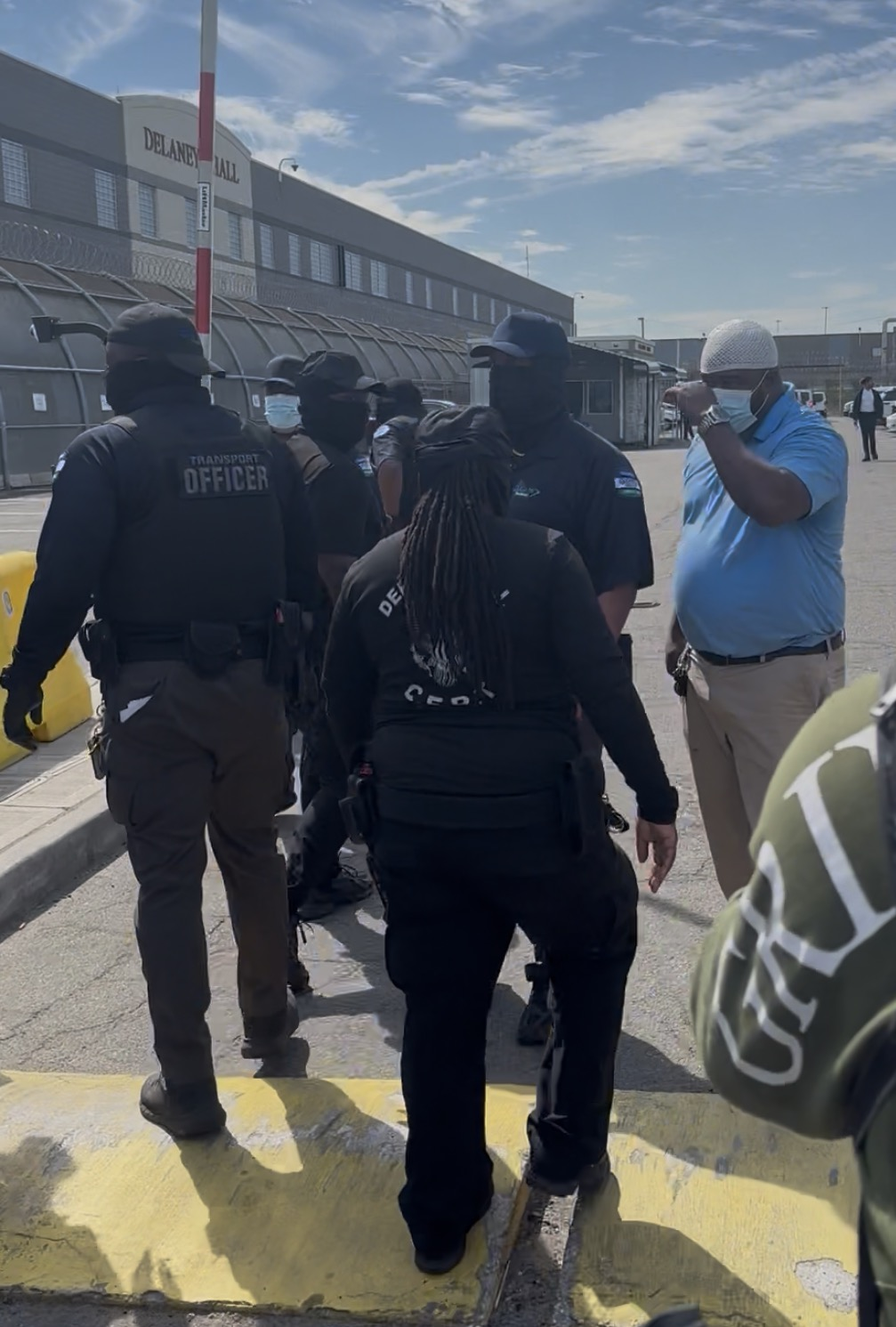
- Masked GEO Group employees outside Delaney Hall
- Demonstrators cheer and beat drums as detainees wave and flicker lights from inside the facility, May 25, 2026

On Monday May 25 (Memorial Day), New Jersey Senator Andy Kim, and Representatives Rob Menendez and Frank Pallone visited the facility. Kim and Menendez reported unsanitary bathroom facilities, poor medical care, and abuse by guards. Pallone, who also visited earlier in the year, described worsening conditions and stated that "People are languishing without knowing if they'll have enough to eat or if they'll be able to receive medical care if they get sick." A WNYC and Gothamist journalist said there were reports of poor access to medical care and retaliatory measures taken against strikers. Kim denounced the conditions inside the facility as "shameful," citing spoiled food and threats of retaliation against strikers. Kim said high schoolers were in the facility, and that taxpayers spend $100,000 per year on each person detained in the facility.

DHS has denied these claims, with DHS Assistant Secretary Lauren Bis saying, "This is nothing more than a political stunt by New Jersey sanctuary politicians for fundraising clicks [...] There is NO hunger strike at Delaney Hall. There are NO subprime conditions or abuse at the facility."

At one point, ICE agents started driving a vehicle towards a crowd of protesters blocking the vehicle. Kim stood with his hands raised in the air between protesters and the ICE agents in an attempt to de-escalate and stop ICE agents from hitting protesters with the vehicle. ICE agents then used pepper spray and pepper balls on the crowd, and Kim was caught in the crossfire. Medics helped Kim recover from pepper spray shortly after. Senate minority leader Chuck Schumer shared a photo of Kim after the incident alongside a photo of senator Alex Padilla forced to the ground and handcuffed last year, writing "When even U.S. Senators are targeted, every American should understand: no one is safe from ICE’s abuses." This post was criticized by Department of Homeland Security (DHS) secretary Markwayne Mullin.

On the same day, New Jersey governor Mikie Sherrill was denied access. Her office later announced that the New Jersey Department of Health "was denied full access and was allowed to inspect only a limited part of the facility" when attempting to conduct a health inspection.

Throughout the protests, detainees have been visible in windows from outside the facility. A Slate journalist noted a tone change in the crowd each day, with more serious protesters arriving during sunset often wearing personal protective equipment and black bloc coverings.

=== May 26: Clashes with ICE ===
External May 26 footage
- ICE agents tase protester and make targeted arrest — Status Coup
- Detainees flicker lights in facility windows — Status Coup
- Protesters block vehicles leaving the facility, ICE attacks — Status Coup

- ICE agents tase and detain a person on railroad tracks
- ICE agents target, push to the ground, and detain a street medic, May 26

On Tuesday May 26, there were clashes between protesters and ICE agents during the night. Protesters set up barricades at one entrance to the facility where GEO Group employees would come and go. At the other side of the facility used by ICE vehicles, protesters linked arms and stood in the way. In response, ICE agents would "rush" into the crowd and pepper spray protesters, beat them with batons, and brandish tasers. A reporter with The Nation reported receiving a "full dose of pepper spray" while filming ICE agents chasing and wrestling a protester to the ground. Shortly after, agents chased another protester across the street and down to the train tracks parallel to the facility, tasing him, pepper spraying him, and detaining him.

Ambulances entered and left the facility throughout the day. According to The Nation:

When protesters attempted to block the ICE cars, they always cleared space for medical emergency vehicles. This soon became something of a ritual, since emergency vehicles were in steady demand. It was not long until every time one arrived ICE cars were close behind them, zooming through the path that protesters made for the ambulances.

=== May 27: Protesters construct barrier, pushed into traffic ===
External May 27 footage
- Protesters build a barrier, ICE agents advance — Mercado Media
- ICE agents advance, push protesters into truck — Status Coup

ICE agents advance on protesters in a human chain, striking them with batons and pushing them back, May 27

On Wednesday May 27, Trump administration 'border czar' Tom Homan said if the hunger hunger strikes continue, he would "force-feed" detainees. He also said "Hunger strikes never work. We are not going to change what we do because someone goes on a hunger strike," and he called protesters outside the facility a "disgrace to this nation."

On the same day, protests escalated outside the facility; amNewYork described the scene:

The streets outside Delaney Hall became a battleground overnight as immigrant rights activists continued their efforts to block vehicles from entering and exiting Delaney Hall amid the ongoing hunger strike among detainees inside its walls. Federal agents wearing heavy body armor and wielding batons and pepper spray forced the group back, and the protesters responded by creating their own shields made of traffic drums, wooden pallets and even a mattress. ICE agents struck protesters with batons [and destroyed the barricade]; the demonstrators launched projectiles such as water bottles and stones in response. Federal agents then launched pepper bombs, hoping to choke the uprising and get the protesters to disperse. When that failed, the agents then began indiscriminately spraying people with pepper-spray. No one was immune to the attack; several journalists [...] were hit with the stinging chemical.

Later that night and into the early hours of Thursday, one group of protesters in the "small minority" blocked trucks passing by outside the facility. Another group of protesters argued their fight was not with the truckers, leading to a confrontation until eventually the streets cleared and truckers were able to access the road.

At one point, a protester threw a traffic cone at an ICE agent, and after another protester threw another object at an ICE agent later that night, it sent "the enraged agent chasing after those in front of him." The agent pushed a protester into a moving truck, causing his leg to jam under one of the truck's large wheels which slowly rolled over his leg. In another instance, a different ICE agent beat a man with a baton against another large truck, which amNewYork described as nearly causing him to be "crushed completely."

Throughout the night, several protesters were arrested, handcuffed, and dragged by ICE agents into Delaney Hall. A reporter with The Nation who had covered the Operation Metro Surge protests said "this was the most violent I had yet seen [ICE] be."

=== May 28: Hospitalizations in the facility ===
External May 28 footage
- ICE agents clash with protesters and make arrests — Status Coup
- ICE agents clash with protesters and make arrests — BG On The Scene

On Thursday May 28, a large white bus entered the facility, and rumors of mass transfers of detainees spread. Several detainees in the facility were spotted being removed from the facility by emergency medical services after ICE reportedly deployed substances against detainees. Two people were removed from the facility on stretchers as they were loaded into ambulances. One organizer said Delaney Hall is a "modern-day concentration camp." According to immigrant rights group Resistencia en Accion:

Reports at approximately 1:40 p.m. reveal that ICE agents attacked the hunger strikers inside with batons and tear gas. Family members outside received calls from inside, confirming that there were people screaming, and according to their loved ones inside, unconscious detainees and blood on surfaces.

The Intercept reported that staff had struck detainees with batons and pepper sprayed them, transferred internal protest leaders to other facilities, and ended family visitation in response to the strike. The DHS denied these allegations, saying they were merely responding to a physical altercation involving detainees and that "staff used the minimum amount of force to safely deescalate the situation."

In the afternoon, a large convoy of new, armed ICE agents arrived providing reinforcements outside the facility. Skirmishes occurred between protesters and ICE agents throughout the day with ICE agents using riot shields and pepper spray to push protesters back, and by the end of the night nine people had been arrested. One protester said ICE agents were "actually trash-talking us when they’re coming up and moving us out." As ambulances entered the facility, protesters made space for ambulances to enter; ICE cars followed close behind the EMS vehicles to make use of the opening created for the ambulances. At one point, around a dozen ICE agents popped out of a van and ran towards the commotion as ICE agents pushed forward with tasers and batons from the facility. Following the conflict, one ICE agent waved a taser around pulling the trigger with the safety on, causing a high-pitched whirring, while other agents twirled their pepper spray around. Some protesters chanted "Quit your job and kill yourself."

=== May 29: "Protest zone" and riot police ===
External May 29 footage
- A cellist activist plays music — Independent videographer
- Police announce dispersal orders — Status Coup
- Journalists ordered to leave car — WNBC
- ICE agents shoot pepper bullets — Status Coup
- Horseback police advance on protesters — Status Coup
- Police use flash bangs and tear gas against protesters — Status Coup

- Protesters and "protest zone" outside Delaney Hall at 8:25pm, shortly before 9pm dispersal orders
- New Jersey State Police (NJSP) order Delaney Hall protesters to disperse under threat of arrest

On Friday May 29, Governor Sherrill ordered New Jersey State Police (NJSP), in collaboration with the Newark Police Division (NPD) and ICE, to take over operations outside Delaney Hall for ICE and establish a "peaceful, protected protest zone" for protesters to go inside in an attempt to "cool things down." She claimed she did so out of fear that there would be a surge of ICE agents in New Jersey if she did not send police to respond. The protest zone created by police was a 600-yard (550 meter) enclosure outside the facility consisting of orange interlinked metal bicycle parking rack fences and concrete blocks.

Department of Homeland Security (DHS) secretary Markwayne Mullin lauded the announcement as a "win for law and order," saying "Thank you, governor." Some protesters staged a sit-in and refused to move into the protest zone, which many protesters characterized as a "cage" and a WNBC reporter characterized as a "pen." One protester said "When sunset happens, they’re going to push us into that cage and mace the fuck out of us."

A Rolling Stone reporter said when they arrived at 6:30pm, "Militant, masked anti-fascists stared down a line of ICE agents in full combat gear — body armor, helmets, guns — standing at the gates of the facility." Most protesters were unwilling to give their real names to reporters due to safety concerns. Police gave up on forcing protesters into the zone, and according to the Rolling Stone:

It was still daylight, and the mood was largely calm. Some elderly protesters chanted and sang on a megaphone, priests and clergy drifted around, activists pushed carts of water and snacks. No one paid much attention to Sherrill’s "protected speech zone," except to use the empty blacktop as a canvas for chalk art. But there were signs that everyone expected the night to get much more tense.

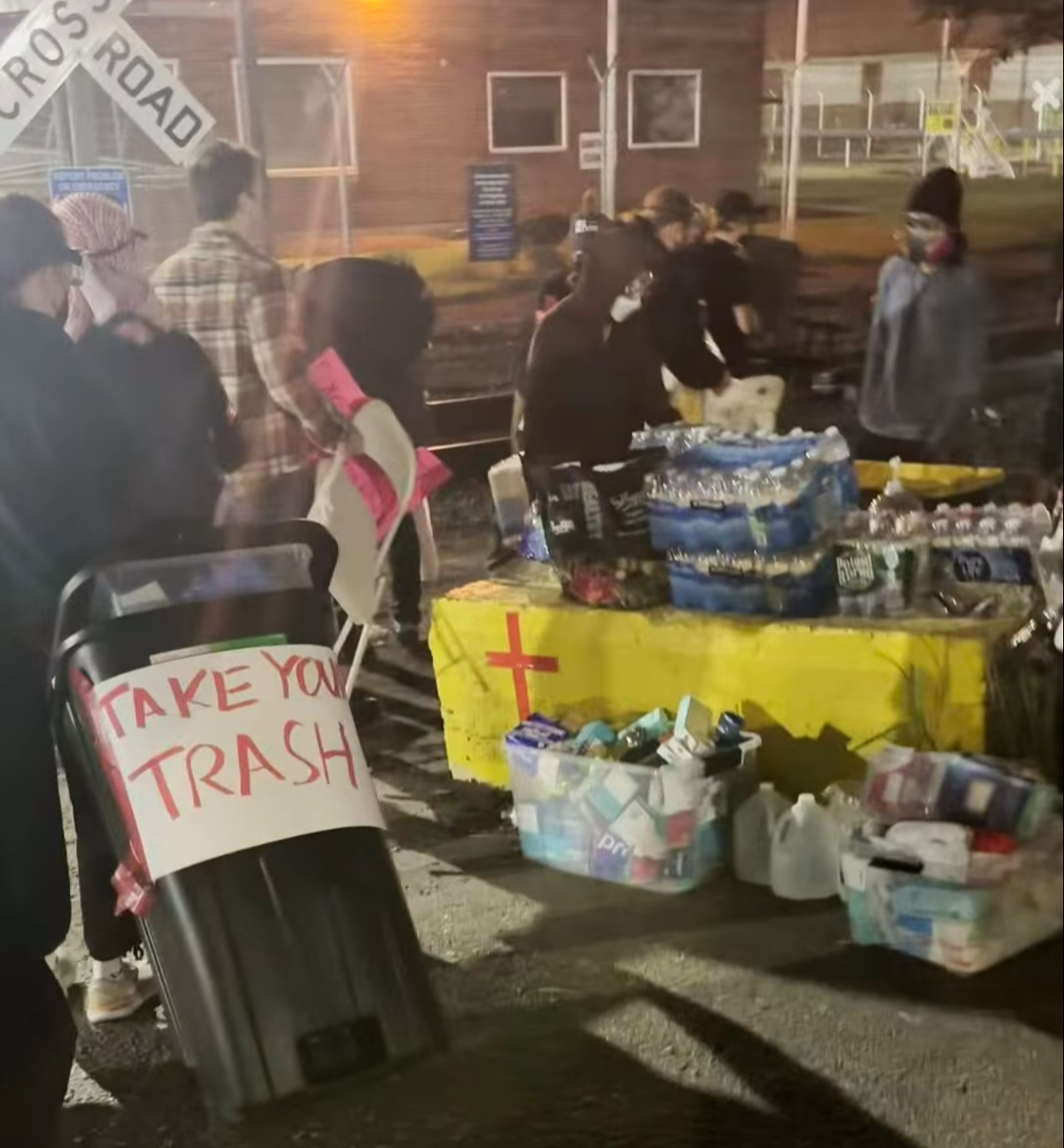
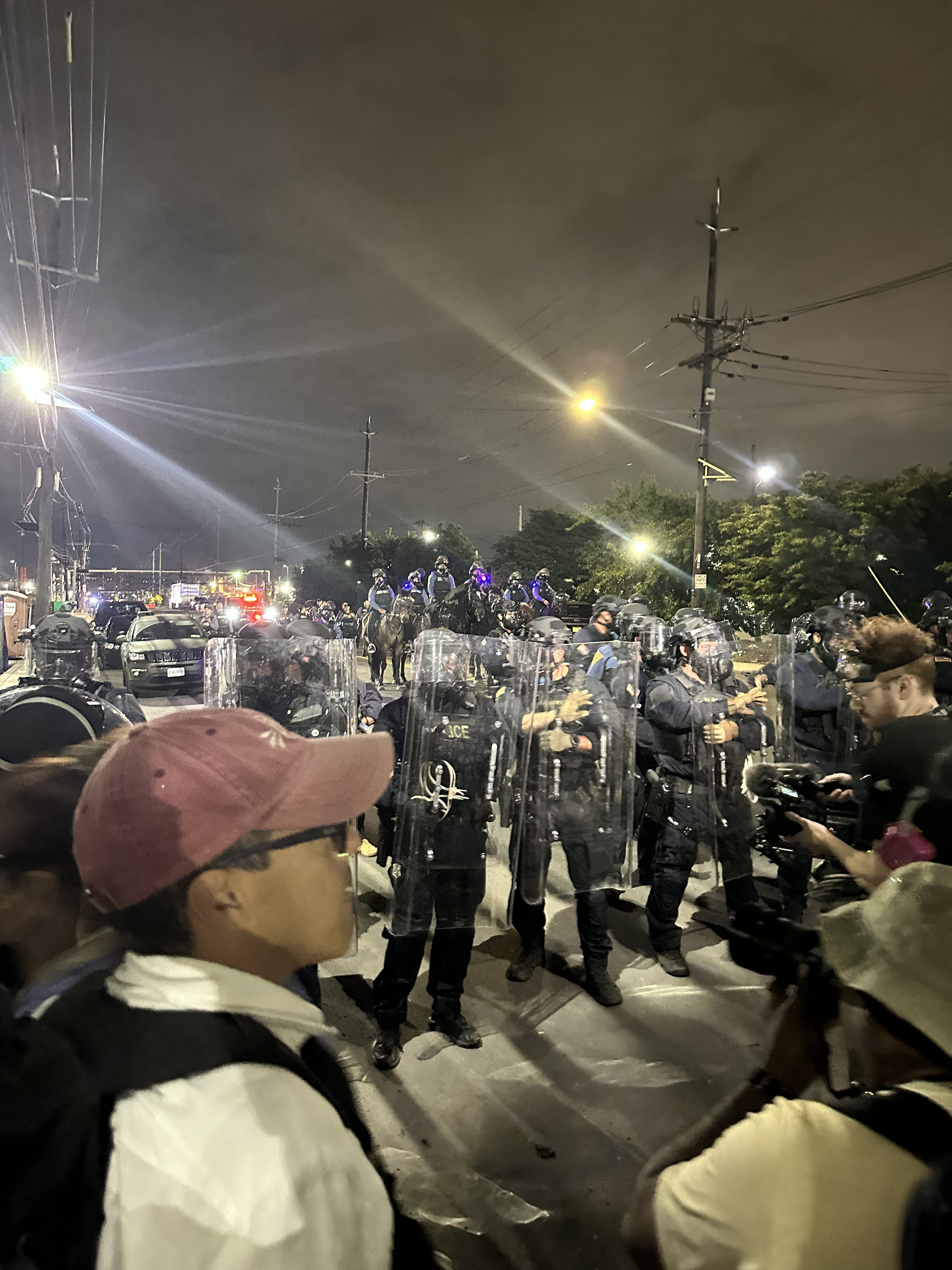
- Protesters moving supplies to a new location after receiving dispersal orders, 9:51pm
- NJSP in riot gear and on horseback in formation shortly before enforcing the curfew
- NJSP riot police advance on protesters with riot shields and stun grenades, while protesters use the traffic cone method to dispose tear gas
- NJSP horseback police advance on protesters, May 29, 2026

After 9pm, an NJSP sergeant arrived in a police SUV and read out an order to disperse from Delaney Hall over a loud speaker, with some members of the crowd yelling back. Officials said this was done in order to create a path for vehicles to exit the facility after state negotiations with federal officials concluded so police could assume control, and street medics in the crowd spread word of the shift change. Shortly after, a line of riot police appeared equipped with riot shields.

A coordinator for the Catholic advocacy group Pax Christi and a leader in Eyes on ICE said she thought the state police presence was "going to be a good thing" and that "up until the point when we saw the riot police with their riot shields, I thought we were gonna be okay based on all the representations I had gotten from legislators for a couple of days now."

NJSP riot police marched down the street on protesters who remained in the area, chanting "GET BACK. GET BACK. GET BACK." Riot police tossed a "volley of flash-bang grenades" that "ripped down the street," causing protesters to fall back. At the same time, officers fired tear gas at protesters using grenade launchers. Some protesters used the traffic cone method to dispose tear gas. As riot police marched, a WNBC news crew covering the clashes from inside a car was ordered by riot police to exit the car, forcing them to step into a cloud of tear gas. A reporter in the news crew said as she ran through the tear gas, she passed nonviolent protesters standing their ground and refusing to leave. At one point, the riot line "split abruptly" creating an opening, and police on horseback advanced through the opening towards protesters, forcing them back. The horses reached the "protest zone" fences, and metal clangs from the fences frightened the horses. The protesters quickly dismantled the "free-speech zone" and shoved its barriers under cars so people wouldn't be trapped or trampled as riot police advanced.

As riot police pushed protesters back, ICE agents watched and fired pepper balls from the facility according to The Nation, which ICE later denied. Troopers began making arrests, "slamming several protesters to the ground" and using pepper spray on the crowd. One officer "beat a demonstrator with a baton across the torso, knee, and calves as he tried to flee." One volunteer asked an old man for his name as he was "groaning" and "retching," with streaming eyes and his hands zip tied behind his back as he was being escorted behind the riot line and past the razor-wire fence into the detention center. Another woman arrested was "moaning in pain, one of her legs unable to support her weight." The next day, NJSP Lieutenant Colonel David Sierotowicz said "We were not striking anybody last night" and claimed they had used standard policing tactics. By the end of the night, six protesters (one from New Jersey, and five from New York and Pennsylvania) had been arrested and were later charged with disorderly conduct and obstruction of law enforcement. Four people arrested by ICE agents that night were charged with assaulting law enforcement officers, obstruction, and threats.

One man had been sitting down on a concrete barricade playing his cello as the riot police advanced, saying he considered it "to be a de-escalatory thing to do." The police then arrested him, and he was subsequently called by the Federal Bureau of Investigation (FBI), which asked him for details about protesters they described as "anybody planning to go to Delaney Hall with not the right intentions." The Intercept characterized this as the FBI trying to "flip" protesters into informants.

As troopers pushed protesters down the street past Delaney Hall, ICE agents watching from the facility advanced on protester supplies containing aid and food and began "trashing everything in sight." Shortly after, a convoy of vehicles containing ICE agents and DHS officers left the facility behind the riot line. After vehicles left the facility, riot police retreated and protesters began regrouping, with some chanting "Whose streets? Our streets!"

Protesters also confronted conservative influencer Cam Higby that night, and Higby pepper sprayed protesters during a confrontation.

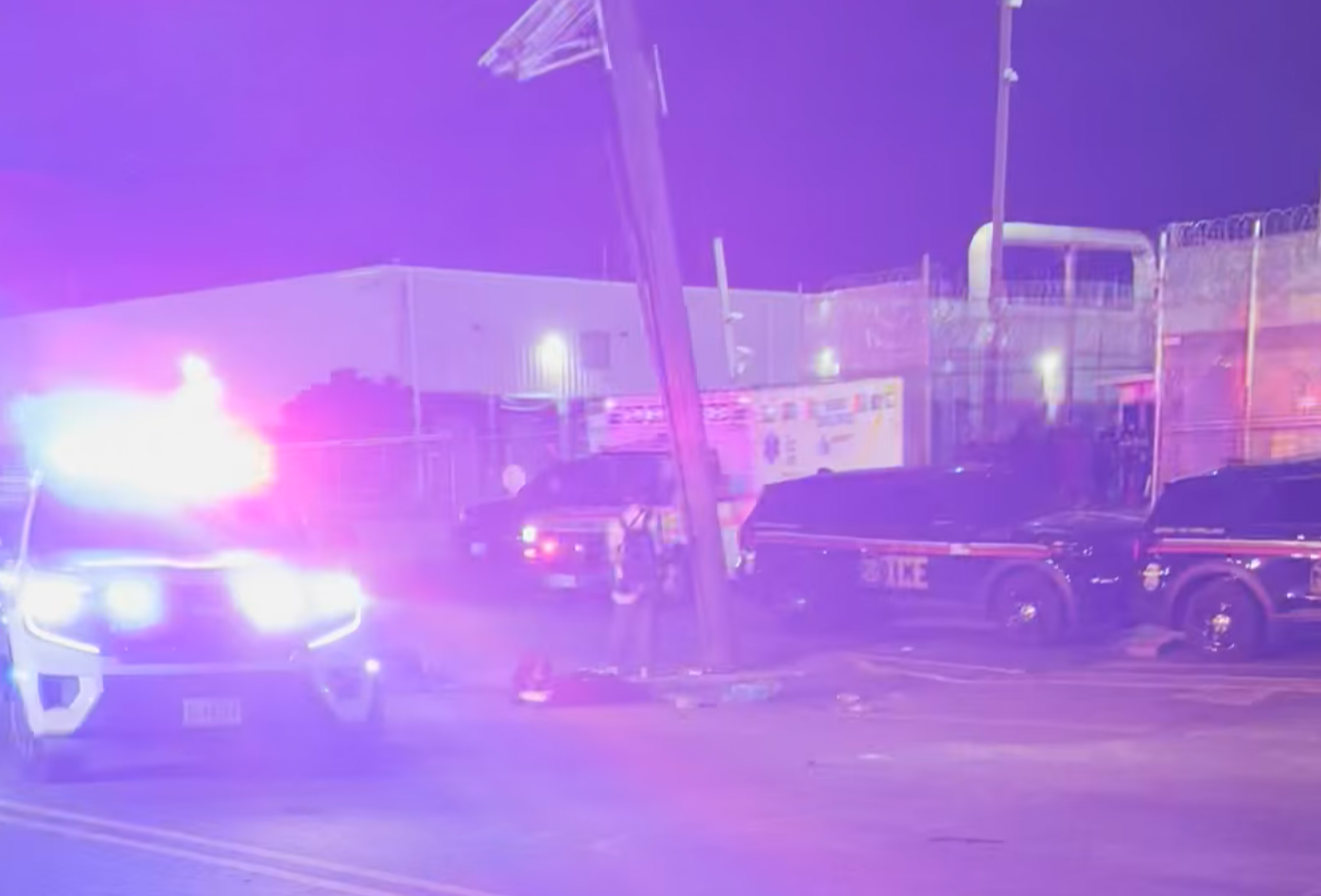
Ambulance leaving Delaney Hall at 11:39pm, May 29

After the skirmishes, one ICE vehicle was visible with a concrete block atop its smashed windshield, and one protester was charged with criminal mischief for smashing car windows by the NPD. The following morning, pepper spray was still able to be smelled in the air.

Sherrill censured out of state protesters, saying "To the people coming from out of state to create chaos and dangerous situations: you should not be here." She also said of the protesters "I do not know why these individuals attacked or what they wanted to accomplish." The DHS accused protesters of being part of a "coordinated campaign of violence against our ICE law enforcement." New Jersey Attorney General Jennifer Davenport accused protesters of throwing tear gas canisters at police prior to when dispersal orders were issued, which The Nation characterized as "a plainly ludicrous claim, since no protester would have been able to procure tear gas ahead of the action."

The political left has been critical of Sherrill's response, calling her actions a betrayal and viewing them as cooperation with ICE. After May 29, one protester's sign read "we asked Mikie Sherrill for help, and she tear gassed us." Status Coup journalist Jordan Chariton said "this is why Democrats continue to lose the faith of the American people. This is why even with Trump in power, Democrats have such low favorability ratings in Congress." The political director of the American Civil Liberties Union New Jersey said the NJSP's actions were "an unnecessary response to free speech and the right to peaceful protest," accusing police of "[mimicking] the dangerous and overly militarized tactics of the federal government." Senior Slate writer Aymann Ismail said Sherrill had escalated the situation.

Also on May 29, former Border Patrol officer Gregory Bovino — who led heavy-handed responses to the Operation Metro Surge protests — posted on X saying "ICE Agents at Delaney, hang in there" and to "Give them hell," attaching an image of himself making a gesture described by news editor Charles R. Davis as a Nazi salute.

=== May 30: Proud Boys, bag theft, and riot police ===
External May 30 footage
- Riot police arrive — Status Coup
- Reporter escorted away by police — MS Now

On the morning of Saturday May 30, Governor Sherrill said "Today and going forward, I urge those protesting outside of Delaney Hall to bring the temperature down, so we can focus on the detainees and their families." Pro-ICE counter protesters arrived outside facility, with special zones and a barricade erected between pro-immigrant and pro-ICE protesters.

Some members of the Proud Boys were in attendance among the counter protesters. One of the Proud Boys, who asked to be referred to as the "Big Duke" of the Proud Boys, said "I think the Democratic Party has been taken over by extreme leftist and communist ideologies. They are here to destroy America." Proud Boys "traded insults with the protesters from within their own enclosure" before eventually retreating. Pro-immigrant protesters chanted "Shut down Delaney Hall, free them all!" and "Shut this racist system down!" Pro-ICE protesters chanted back "USA, USA" and held signs saying "Make America Great Again" and "Support ICE." Left-wing livestreamer Hasan Piker arrived, and right-wing influencers tried to debate him.

Police from multiple local jurisdictions were on site, and a row of police held riot shields alongside a police barricade on Doremus Avenue blocking protesters from getting close to Delaney Hall. Newark police occasionally drove through on motorcycles while ICE agents stayed close to the building.

That night, there were again standoffs between police and protesters, with police again using flash bang grenades, horseback police, and tear gas. The Nation said the tear gas was "excessive" and was fired "indiscriminately." The amount of noise made horses act unpredictably. Riot police and protesters fought over barricades as police used riot shields to push them back, and Governor Sherrill characterized protesters as "utilizing the barriers as weapons." Horseback police were again used to break up groups of protesters. Sherrill also said tires were lit on fire in the street and that projectiles were thrown by "masked individuals." Two people were arrested and charged with disorderly conduct and obstruction of justice, and one with weapon possession, state police said.

Following the standoffs, local county sergeant Darryl Brown was charged with theft of an Associated Press journalist's camera equipment. The journalist was a 25 year old who had dropped her camera bag, which stored roughly $10,000 of equipment, after being injured filming the protest and having to be carried off by volunteer medics. She found the bag using an Apple AirTag to track it to Brown's home. A nonprofit started a lawsuit to sue police for refusing to release police body camera footage of the incident. Following the incident, the sergeant was suspended without pay and the Essex County prosecutor started an investigation against him.

=== May 31: Kettling, arrests, and journalist arrests ===
External May 31 footage
- Police run towards protesters before kettle — Status Coup
- Police begin the kettle — Status Coup
- Police begin the kettle — Mercado Media
- Police tighten the kettle — Status Coup
- Police order press to leave the kettle — Status Coup
- Police in altercation with journalist — Mercado Media

- NJSP kettle protesters and journalists
- NJSP arrest a protester sitting down inside the kettle
- Protesters sing We Shall Not Be Moved during the kettle, May 31, 2026

On the morning of Sunday May 31, Newark mayor Ras Baraka announced an overnight curfew imposed by the Newark Police Division (NPD) in half-mile radius surrounding Delaney Hall between the hours of 9:00pm and 6:00am. Sherrill supported the curfew, saying "violent, chaotic clashes hurt everyone. They put the lives of both protesters and law enforcement in danger. They take the focus away from the people inside Delaney Hall and their families. And they raise the temperature with ICE." At around the same time, the Department of Homeland Security (DHS) posted on X saying the area around the facility had been secured and that they "WON'T BACK DOWN."

An hour before the curfew, military-grade armored vehicles arrived on the scene. At 8:30pm, the New Jersey State Police (NJSP) issued a verbal warning about the curfew in English and Spanish, prompting many to disperse. Shortly after, a line of NJSP riot police with riot shields blocked every exit on the street. At around 10pm, hundreds of riot police began running and surrounded over 61 peaceful protesters and members of the press in a kettle. Some members of the media reported being run out of the area.

Inside the kettle, a senior officer emerged from behind the shields and said "Listen up. If you are press, you got the opportunity right now — and that's it — to leave. If you don't leave out here in an orderly fashion, you are coming with us." He then pointed at someone in the group and snapped "You are not press."

After the announcement, protesters began chanting "Press don't leave!" After members of the press were escorted from the kettle, they were chased away by police until they were about 100 feet (30 meters) from the kettle. The NPD then ordered press to go even further down the road from where they were recording the kettle, prompting objections and a confrontation. Over an officer's radio, a voice said "If they refuse to move, push them back yourselves."

Everyone who remained in the kettle was arrested, making for 61 total arrests. During the arrests, riot police tightened the kettle, "cramming journalists and protesters closer together." Multiple members of the press were denied exit, including a conservative commentator who ended up with a black eye. At least three journalists in the kettle were arrested and spent a full day in custody while lawyers were denied access to see them. One of the arrested journalists, wearing a blue vest with the word "press" and an ID from his company dangled around his neck, was a member of the National Press Photographers Association. He was arrested by officers after being told his credentials were not verified. The Guardian later asked the governor's office and mayor's office what "verified" credentials meant and did not receive a response. Another of the arrested journalists was injured and taken to a hospital, where he said two arrested protesters were also being treated for injuries from the arrests. One journalist claimed they were charged with felony rioting and resisting arrest. The Freedom of the Press Foundation member said after the incident, "at least three of those arrested ended up in the hospital. Do I really need to explain why press cameras needed to be rolling?"

The New Jersey Office of the Public Defender (OPD) said all of the complaints they examined included fourth-degree rioting and resisting arrest felony charges, which carry a maximum sentence of 18 months in prison. The people arrested were taken to the Essex County Correctional Facility and held for over 24 hours because the NPD was slow to process them. The OPD said this was "unnecessary and really not something that happens very often," and the office said charging with felonies was a "big reach" based on the "kind of conduct we were seeing from protesters on the ground." A lawyer in the OPD said all the complaints he examined by police used "boilerplate language listing the offenses said to be committed by the crowd collectively, without offering detail on what any individual is accused of doing." He said "The police have not made out the barest minimum of probable cause," and the office said these cases were typically charged via summons rather than an arrest warrant.

Eighteen press freedom organizations co-signed a public condemnation of the arrests, including the American Society of Journalists and Authors (ASJA); Coalition For Women In Journalism (CFWIJ); Committee to Protect Journalists (CPJ); The Deadline Club; The Free Press (CBS News); Freedom of the Press Foundation (FPF); International Women's Media Foundation (IWMF); Investigative Reporters and Editors (IRE); National Press Photographers Association (NPPA); National Press Club (NPC); the National Press Club Journalism Institute; New York Press Club (NYPC); New Jersey Society of Professional Journalists; PEN America; Radio Television Digital News Association (RTDNA); Reporters Without Borders (RSF); Society of Environmental Journalists (SEJ); and Society of Professional Journalists (SPJ). The letter alleged First Amendment violations by law enforcement and demanded the dropping of charges against journalists arrested. The committee to Protect Journalists said "This type of behavior has no place in a democracy." The Free Press said arrests of journalists were intended to "chill coverage" of abuses during the arrests. Reporters Without Borders said "these attacks are unconstitutional repression typical of an authoritarian regime."

Shortly after the arrests, New Jersey Attorney General Jennifer Davenport issued a statement thanking police for "de-escalating" the situation and saying those arrested were "armed" with helmets, shields, and gas masks. DHS retweeted a post on X bragging about kettling the protesters. Baraka lifted the curfew the next day.

The OPD, representing roughly 40 out of the 61 people arrested, said over half of arrestees were approached by Federal Bureau of Investigation (FBI) agents for questioning after the FBI obtained arrestee telephone records and address information from criminal complaints from the arrests. The OPD claimed friends and family of arrestees were approached, and the FBI also arrived outside their apartments for knock and talks. The OPD argued this violated their right to legal representation.

Governor Sherrill defended the police response at the protests. When a caller during a phone-in likened the state police response to Operation Metro Surge federal crackdowns in Minneapolis, Sherrill denied the comparison, saying "Nobody [was] certainly killed in this instance" (referring to the killings of Renée Good and Alex Pretti). The next day, protesters carried signs critical of Governor Sherrill, accusing her of making things worse and "lying about Delaney Hall." Protesters also chanted "Hey, Mikie, WTF?"

Baraka released a public statement condemning the actions of police over the weekend, saying the NJSP "kind of resembled what ICE was doing in the first place" and characterizing their behavior as "overly aggressive, unnecessary and in some cases, unconstitutional."

=== June 2: Lawsuit against GEO Group ===
On Tuesday June 2, New Jersey Attorney General Jennifer Davenport announced a lawsuit by the state of New Jersey suing GEO Group in order allow the New Jersey Department of Health to inspect the facility.

=== June 3: Undercover police infiltration ===
On Wednesday June 3, the Newark Police Division (NPD) assigned undercover police to infiltrate protests outside the facility. The police assigned were two detectives wearing plainclothes. ICE agents initiated an ambush by flanking protesters with a minivan, exiting the vehicle, and surrounding them, and the detectives then made a targeted arrest against a 30-year-old protester in the crowd. The protester was later accused of dragging tarp into a fire on Saturday May 30.

The American Civil Liberties Union said, "The use of plainclothes officers presents the concern of people constantly being surveilled when they are engaging in First Amendment-protected activity." An uninvolved defense attorney commented "at what point do the actions of these undercover agents become a pressure tactic as opposed to a law enforcement tactic?" The Intercept alleges the NPD's official statement on the operation elides their cooperation with ICE.

=== June 5: Car hits journalist ===
On Friday June 5, protesters were putting their bodies in front of vehicles they said were workers leaving. Protesters were banging on windows and kicking cars as they left the facility. One protester was "clipped" by a car, and a photojournalist was "hit and partially dragged" by a car leaving the facility.

=== June 21: Car hits protester, Father's Day ===
External May 31 footage
- Woman struck by car — CBS

On Sunday June 21, protesters held a Father's Day vigil, and tied neckties to the fence outside the facility to honor fathers who remained detained. Some protesters holding up signs saying "Free the dads."

During the vigil, one female protester was struck by a red Dodge Challenger from behind at around 1:52pm as it drove into the facility. According to The Jersey Vindicator, "Onlookers gasped and screamed as the car struck James near the waist, sending the American flag flying and dragging her several yards across the pavement." According to protesters, protests then escalated, with some demonstrators throwing plastic bottles and yelling, prompting federal agents to deploy pepper balls and pepper spray. DHS disputed this account, accusing activists of rioting prior to when the protester was hit by the vehicle. The protester was taken to University Hospital in Newark with non-life-threatening injuries. An investigation by the Newark Police Division (NPD) ensued.

The protester announced intent to sue GEO Group and ICE. A DHS spokesperson stated that the vehicle "was not being driven by an ICE employee," and the Newark Public Safety director confirmed that the person driving the car was an employee at GEO Group named Thomas Brown, who is being charged with assault.

=== June 22: End of hunger strike ===
On Monday June 22, one month (31 days) after the beginning of the hunger and labor strike, advocates with pro-immigrant group Eyes on ICE, which had been supporting immigrants inside the facility, announced that because of "intimidation tactics" by guards used to discipline and segregate detainees, detainees were ending their strike despite how conditions had not improved. According to the New Jersey Alliance for Immigrant Justice, hundreds of detainees were transferred out of the facility to punish them for dissent. Eyes on ICE said strikers were sent to unknown locations across the country, including Louisiana, Texas, Pennsylvania, California, Arizona, and Colorado.

After the strike ended, family visitation, which was briefly suspended, was reinstated with restrictions such as only being offered twice per week, 30 minutes long, and limiting visitation to family members on an approved list, leading to many visiting families being turned away.

=== June 27: American flag incident ===
External May 31 footage
- Protesters burn American flag, ICE agents advance — Status Coup

On Saturday June 27, protests continued outside Delaney Hall despite an end to the hunger strike. Protesters burned an American flag outside the facility, followed by multiple federal agents "running towards protesters and tackling several to the ground" and pepper spraying them.

=== July 2: Heat wave ===
On Thursday July 2, during the 2026 North American heat wave, detainees in the facility reported that air conditioning failed, leaving some people sleeping naked and struggling to breathe. Detainees reported the cooling system failed on Wednesday. Detainees have also reported the water tasting metallic and "off," with it looking discolored, yellow, and dirty. Staff told House Representative Josh Gottheimer's office they are waiting for replacement parts to arrive. After Gottheimer contacted Delaney Hall, he reported detainees were being moved to a space with working AC.

=== July 16: Jersey City pulls funds from Citizens Bank ===
On July 16, a spokesperson for Jersey City mayor James Solomon announced the city was pulling funds from Citizens Bank over its financial support for GEO Group and CoreCivic, largely in response to Delaney Hall in Newark. The spokesperson said "Citizens Bank made a choice to finance the caging of human beings for profit. Jersey City is making a choice too: we will not be complicit." On July 17, Citizens bank announced it will stop helping GEO Group and CoreCivic get financing, not because of policy issues, but because the firms no longer need their help.

=== August 1: Death of second detainee ===
In August 2026, Salvadoran immigrant Edwin Lopez-Cornejo, 41, died while in custody. ICE said that Mr. Lopez-Cornejo was pronounced dead in August 2026 at University Hospital after he experienced a medical emergency at Delaney Hall. The cause of his death was not known.

== Additional controversies ==
=== ICE face masks ===
In March 2026, Governor Mikie Sherrill signed a bill banning law enforcement, including ICE agents, from wearing face masks in the state of New Jersey. However, ICE agents have worn masks outside Delaney Hall during the protests.

=== Facial recognition AI ===
Department of Homeland Security (DHS) secretary Markwayne Mullin acknowledged facial recognition AI was used to successfully identify protesters at Delaney Hall.

=== Additional targeting of journalists ===
The U.S. Press Freedom Tracker reported dozens of assaults by law enforcement against journalists covering the Delaney Hall protests between May 22 and May 31. In five incidents, journalists' equipment was damaged by law enforcement.

Journalists covering the protests have also been reported being turned away by police for carrying bags used to carry personal protective equipment (PPE) such as goggles, helmets, and gas masks used to protect from weapons such as tear gas, pepper spray, and rubber bullets. One journalist at the protests said said, "I think it’s incredibly dangerous to expect that journalists would put themselves in these situations without being able to protect themselves."

== Additional reactions ==
Amidst the strike and protests, both 18-year-old women in the facility were released along with all pregnant women, which advocates celebrated as a win, but no other advocate demands have been met.

Politico said "The protesters outside Delaney Hall were largely there to highlight what Democrats have called unsanitary and unsafe conditions inside." The Rolling Stone said "the sustained protests have turned the Delaney Hall detainees into a national story." NPR said reporters, local congressional leaders, and advocates all back up detainee claims, in contrast with the government which says the strikes never happened.

Physicians for Human Rights published a report in collaboration with the Human Rights Center at UC Berkeley about use of force by law enforcement in the US mostly against protesters and journalists from June 2025 to June 2026. It accused law enforcement of using "excessive force" and of "wielding crowd-control weapons in dangerous ways," including at the Delaney Hall protests, where they documented 21 incidents.

Government and conservative characterizations of the protests have been very negative, with Governor Sherill accusing some protesters she considers "agitators" of being from "national extremist groups" without naming specific groups. President Donald Trump accused all protesters outside of Delaney Hall of being paid protesters without evidence, saying "These aren’t protesters. These people are fake."

The protests outside Delaney Hall were used by multiple Republican politicians as a reason to increase CBP and ICE funding by US$70 billion. The funding efforts succeeded. Senator Marsha Blackburn said, "For days, far-left rioters have assaulted law enforcement outside Delaney Hall." Senator John Kennedy also criticized the protesters.

Newark mayor Ras Baraka's response to the protests has been mixed, including both criticism of protesters as well as criticism of some use of force by police. After the Newark Police Division (NPD) responded to protests, he said "it appeared that some of our officers were over aggressive and should be held accountable." Baraka also criticized the NPD after they intervened in the blocking of ICE vehicles by protesters, saying "The responsibility for maintaining secure access to the facility lies with GEO." In another public statement, Baraka said the protests outside Delaney Hall had been peaceful for the year leading up to the hunger strike until "a sharp and troubling shift occurred. ICE increased its presence and engaged protesters in ways that escalated tensions and led to unnecessary confrontation."

Baraka, Governor Sherrill, and conservatives have censured "outside agitator" protesters, a characterization condemned by advocates and organizers. The Philadelphia Inquirer columnist Will Bunch published an opinion piece, where he censured Sherrill's characterizations of protesters as outside agitators, arguing traveling between states is not evidence of wrongdoing and saying characterizing protesters as outside agitators resulted in an "over-the-top police response." The Guardian mentioned that although many protesters are from nearby states, so are many detainees in Delaney Hall according to a research assistant professor.

== See also ==
- 2026 U.S. immigration enforcement protests
- 2025 Delaney Hall oversight incident
- Controversies involving ICE and private businesses
- List of immigrant detention sites in the United States
- Deportation in the second Trump administration
- Government attacks on journalists during the Trump presidencies
- "Outside agitators"
- List of protests in the United States
