= Cam Higby =

American conservative political commentator

Cameron Higby
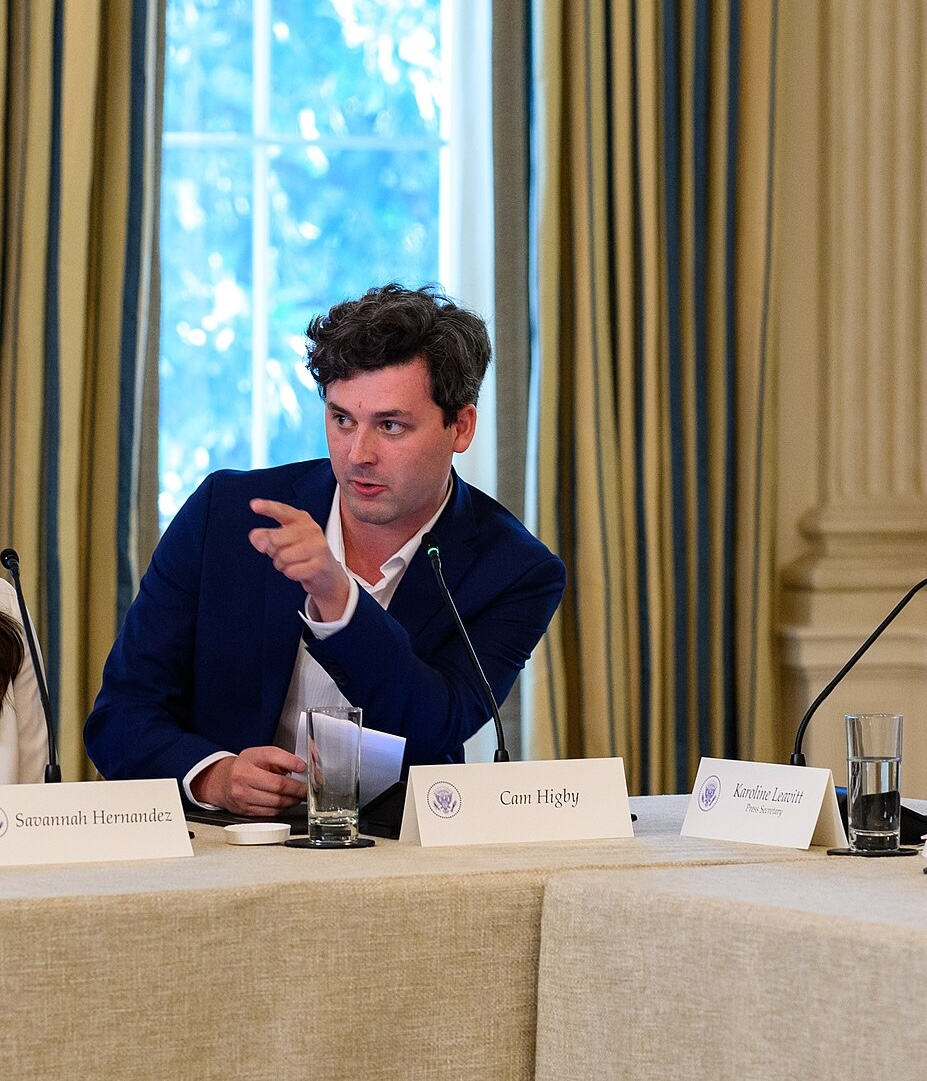
- Higby at the White House in 2025 for an Antifa roundtable hosted by President Donald Trump
- Born: Gouverneur, New York, U.S.
- Occupation: Political commentator
- Years active: 2020–present
- Employer(s): Fearless Media; Today Is America; PragerU (both formerly)
- Known for: Far right political commentary; Pentagon press corps

Cameron Higby is a conservative American political commentator who operates under the outlet Fearless Media. He is known for filming political protests, debating students on college campuses, and serving as a member of the Pentagon press corps under the second Trump administration.

== Career ==
In 2020, Higby was a member of the Conservative Hype House, a collective of prominent creators with 1.4 million followers on TikTok. Higby previously worked for PragerU, where he hosted "The Wrap Up," and for the conservative digital outlet Today Is America, before founding his own outlet, Fearless Media.

Much of his content consists of man-on-the-street debates at college campuses and coverage of protests, which he live streams and posts to social media platforms including X and YouTube. He describes his work as combining on-the-ground reporting with political commentary, and is open about his conservative viewpoint.

Following the killing of Charlie Kirk in September 2025, Higby organized the "Fearless Debates Tour," a campus debate series he described as being held in Kirk's honor. The tour involved setting up a table at college campuses and inviting students to debate topics including immigration and DEI policy.

In October 2025, Higby and the tour were threatened and then escorted off the campus of Tennessee State University, an HBCU, after arriving unannounced and displaying signs reading "DEI should be illegal" and "Deport all illegals now! Let's talk." Higby stated he had not known the university was an HBCU when the group selected it. On October 8, Higby participated in an "Antifa Roundtable" with Donald Trump alongside administration officials and other conservative influencers who had been on the ground at various left-wing protests.

The same month, also as part of the tour, Higby set up a debate table at the University of Illinois Urbana-Champaign in conjunction with the university's Turning Point USA chapter

In December 2025, Higby was credentialed as a member of the new Pentagon press corps after nearly all traditional news outlets surrendered their passes in protest of new restrictions imposed by Defense Secretary Pete Hegseth. Higby and other conservative influencers signed the Pentagon's 21-page media agreement, which traditional outlets had refused on the grounds that it restricted standard news-gathering practices.

During his first week at the Pentagon, Higby shared photographs claiming to be sitting at The Washington Post's former desk, a claim also made by several other newly credentialed influencers. Washington Post reporter Dan Lamothe, whose desk it had been, shared a compilation of the conflicting claims on social media. Higby defended the Pentagon's new media restrictions and argued that legacy journalists had created a hostile work environment in the building.

At his first Pentagon briefing, Higby asked Pentagon Press Secretary Kingsley Wilson about claims made by Candace Owens regarding an alleged French assassination plot against her, an inquiry that received no substantive response.

In January 2026, Higby traveled to Minneapolis during the Trump administration's surge of ICE agents to the city. He posted screen recordings from a Signal group chat he claimed to have "infiltrated," which he presented as evidence that community activists were coordinating to impede federal agents, dubbing the disclosure "Signal Gate." FBI director Kash Patel announced a criminal investigation into the Signal chats on a podcast, citing Higby's posts as the basis for opening the inquiry. Legal experts found no evidence of illegal activity in the chats Higby posted. The chats' contents included a guide emphasizing that participants should be "witnesses, not warriors" and should not impede law enforcement.

In May 2026, outside Delaney Hall in Newark, New Jersey during the Delaney Hall hunger strike and protests, Higby got in a confrontation and pepper sprayed anti-ICE protesters.

Wired described Higby as part of a network of right-wing creators whose content "appears designed" to frame ICE opposition as lawless, with posts amplified by figures including Elon Musk and Trump administration officials.

== Personal life ==
On June 23, 2024, Higby was filming outside Adas Torah synagogue in the Pico-Robertson neighborhood of Los Angeles during a pro-Palestinian protest. He was temporarily blinded after being sprayed with bear spray. He was assisted by Rabbi Arye Sufrin, head of school at YULA, who summoned a paramedic.

In July 2025, Jeremy Lawson was charged with second-degree felony assault for allegedly attacking Higby at an anti-ICE rally in Seattle, resulting in a concussion and head trauma. A King County deputy prosecutor noted at the hearing that Lawson had allegedly posted online expressing support for the assault and subsequently texted Higby indicating he knew where he lived. The judge set bail at $75,000.

In October 2025, during the Fearless Debates Tour, Higby pepper-sprayed a woman at Columbus Circle outside Union Station in Washington, D.C. after the woman grabbed and slammed his MAGA hat onto his face. U.S. Park Police arrested and charged the woman with multiple offenses. Higby described the use of pepper spray as self-defense.

=== Legal issues ===
In October 2026, Higby and James O'Keefe were charged with felony unlawful voting and identity theft. It was previously announced in August 2026, by Minnesota Secretary of State Steve Simon, that authorities were investigating the two. O'Keefe and Higby had allegedly used the names of multiple deceased and one living Minnesotan at four polling locations in August 2026.

== See also ==
- Turning Point USA
- Operation Metro Surge
