= Traffic cone method =

Tear gas disposal method

Protesters at the Delaney Hall protests using the method to put out tear gas canisters, May 2026

In 2019, Hong Kong protesters invented a way of using traffic cones to dispose tear gas when riot police are attempting to disperse a crowd. The method works by placing a traffic cone over the gas canister to trap the gas inside the cone and then by dousing the canister with water through an opening in the top of the cone. The method has been used at protests around the world, including in Chile and the United States, after videos on social media spread of the method being used during the Hong Kong protests.

== History ==
Protestors in Hong Kong using the method to put out tear gas canisters, October 2019

The use of traffic cones was first documented in 2019 during the 2019–2020 Hong Kong protests, during which frontline protesters became adept at extinguishing tear gas. They formed special "firefighter" teams that sprang into action as soon as a tear gas canister was fired. These individuals generally wore personal protective equipment, including heat-proof gloves, or covered their arms and legs with cling film to prevent the painful skin irritation. Canisters were sometimes picked up and lobbed back at police or extinguished straight away with water or neutralised using objects such as traffic cones.

They shared information about models of 3M respirator filters which had been found to be most effective against tear gas, and where those models could be purchased. Other volunteers carried saline solutions to rinse the eyes of those affected. Specialized individuals sometimes act as tear gas medics, and another group, the "shield-bearers", protected the protesters from the direct physical impact of the grenades.

Dedicated units called "firefighter teams" are assigned to disposing of tear gas, which leaps into action as soon as a canister is fired. The technique requires water to hit the canister inside the traffic cone, meaning it often requires lots of water because it is difficult to aim inside the cone.

After online videos of the strategy spread, the technique became familiar across the world. In 2019-2020, the method was used by Chilean protesters against Primera Línea. In the 2020 George Floyd protests in Portland, Oregon, the traffic cone method was used. The method has also been used in the 2026 Delaney Hall protests.

== See also ==
- Tactics and methods surrounding the 2019–2020 Hong Kong protests
