= Fraternal Order of Police v. City of Newark =

1999 U.S. Third Circuit Court case on law enforcers' First Amendment freedoms

- Court: United States Court of Appeals for the Third Circuit
- Full case name: Fraternal Order of Police Newark Lodge No. 12; Faruq Abdul-Aziz; Shakoor Mustafa v. City of Newark; Newark Police Department; Joseph J. Santiago, Newark Police Director; Thomas C. O'Reilly, Newark Chief of Police
- Decided: March 3, 1999
- Citations: 170 F.3d 359; 79 Fair Empl. Prac. Cas. (BNA) 323; 75 Empl. Prac. Dec. (CCH) ¶ 45,820

Case history
- Prior history: District Court ruled in plaintiffs' favor

Court membership
- Judges sitting: Morton Ira Greenberg, Samuel Alito, Theodore A. McKee

Case opinions
- Majority: Alito, joined by a unanimous court

Fraternal Order of Police, Newark Lodge No. 12 v. City of Newark, 170 F.3d 359 (3d Cir. 1999), was a case challenging an internal order of the City of Newark Police Department requiring its officers to be clean-shaven. The Third Circuit Court of Appeals held that the order merited strict scrutiny and did not survive exacting review. Therefore, the order violated the Free Exercise Clause of the First Amendment.

== Background ==
The order contained two exceptions, one for undercover police officers and one for medical conditions, such as pseudofolliculitis barbae. The plaintiffs, Officers Faruq Abdul-Aziz and Shakoor Mustafa, were Sunni Muslim Newark Police Officers represented by the Fraternal Order of Police. They argued that the order violated their Free Exercise rights under the First Amendment by requiring them to shave their beards in violation of their religious beliefs. The United States District Court for the District of New Jersey enjoined the police department from enforcing the order against the plaintiffs.

== Third Circuit Holding ==
In an opinion written by then Judge Samuel Alito, the Third Circuit Court of Appeals affirmed the District Court's ruling, holding that the internal order merited strict scrutiny and that the denial of an exemption to the plaintiffs violated the Free Exercise Clause. The court reasoned that the exemption for undercover officers was not problematic, as it did not undermine the purpose behind the order, which was uniformity of appearance among officers. The medical exemption, however, did frustrate uniformity. This suggested that in the department's view a secular reason (such as a medical condition) for wearing a beard was important enough to forego uniformity, but a religious reason was not. Because the department had preferred the secular to the religious, heightened scrutiny was necessary, and none of the interests argued by the Police Department could withstand strict scrutiny.

== Legal Significance ==
In Employment Division v. Smith, the Supreme Court held that neutral laws of general applicability did not violate the Free Exercise Clause even if those laws burdened religious exercise. The Court in Smith did not address whether laws containing exemptions are appropriately considered neutral and generally applicable. Police v. City of Newark holds that laws with even a single exemption are not neutral and generally applicable. This decision was considered during the Supreme Court confirmation hearings for Justice Alito.
