= Outside agitator =

American political term of disparagement

"Outside agitator" is a concept and term used in the United States to discount political unrest as being driven by outsiders, as opposed to being driven by legitimate community grievances. Outside agitators are considered by critics to be "disturbers of peace," and experts argue the idea has been used to justify disproportionate police crackdowns on civil disobedients. The term was first used by Martin Luther King Jr. in his Letter from Birmingham Jail during the 1960s civil rights movement. The term regained prominence during the 2020 George Floyd protests, the 2024 Gaza war protests at universities, and the 2026 anti-ICE Delaney Hall protests.

== History ==
In the 1960s, the notion was popularized during the early stages of the civil rights movement in the United States, when Southern authorities discounted African-American protests as being driven by Northern white radicals, rather than being legitimate expressions of grievances. During the 1965 Selma to Montgomery marches, segregationist Governor George Wallace characterized protesters as "outsiders." Martin Luther King Jr. censured the term in his 1963 Letter from Birmingham Jail, citing it as a phrase designed to dismiss civil disobedience. King equated his treatment as an outside agitator with how throughout history, "Whenever the early Christians entered a town, the people in power became disturbed and immediately sought to convict the Christians for being 'disturbers of the peace' and 'outside agitators.'"

In 2014, during the Ferguson unrest, the term was used to blame "outside agitators" for destruction, looting, and burning of buildings.

In 2020, the term was used during the George Floyd protests, with Governor Tim Walz in Minneapolis claiming that most protesters were not from the city, despite jail records and social media indicating otherwise.

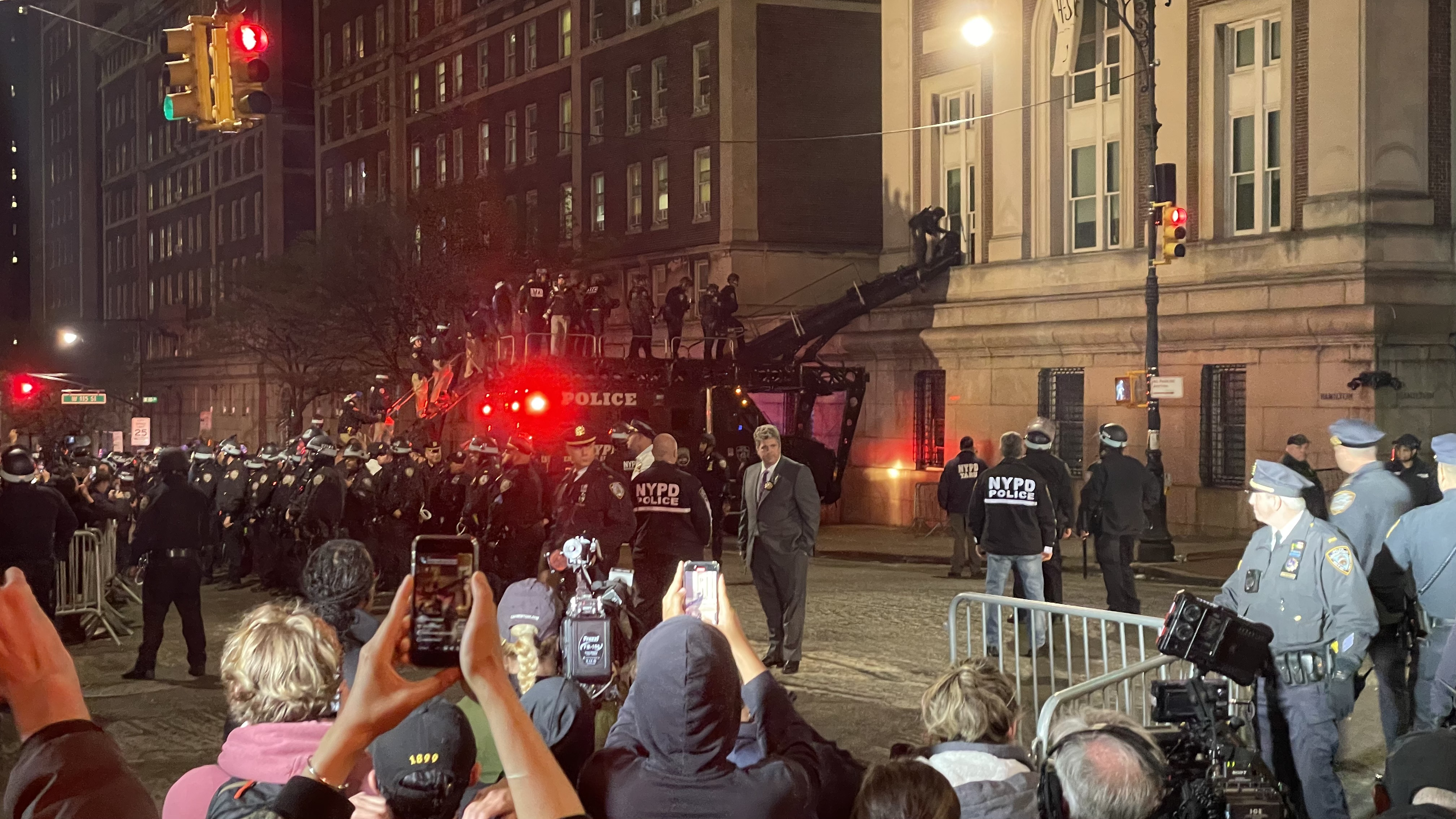
The NYPD preparing to clear protesters who occupied Columbia University's Hamilton Hall in 2024, which Eric Adams attributed in part to outside agitators

In 2024, the term saw widespread use by public figures and media coverage during the Gaza solidarity protests on university campuses. The term was used to dismiss student protests by claiming that they'd been coopted by foreign actors rather than acting organically. After clearing out the 2024 Gaza Solidarity Encampment and Hind's Hall occupation of Hamilton Hall at Columbia University, New York City Police Department deputy commissioner Tarik Sheppard claimed that the chains of bike locks sold by Columbia University were "not what students bring to school" to support the claim that outside agitators were responsible for students locking themselves in Hamilton Hall. New York City Mayor Eric Adams also emphasized the role of outside agitators in the protests. The chaplain of the Columbia Catholic student center, Roger J. Landry, also echoed these allegations. At the California Gaza war protests, "outside agitator" allegations were also made. According to the Associated Press, university administrators and politicians have historically invoked the "outside agitator" label during campus demonstrations to dismiss student demands and justify law enforcement intervention.

In 2026, many people from out-of-state traveled to the Delaney Hall immigrant detention facility in Newark, New Jersey during the 2026 Delaney Hall hunger strike and protests. Some protesters engaged in black bloc tactics, and many protesters were characterized as outside agitators. New Jersey governor Mikie Sherrill said "To the people coming from out of state to create chaos and dangerous situations: you should not be here." Newark Mayor Ras Baraka, Governor Sherrill, and right-wingers have censured "outside agitator" protesters, a characterization condemned by advocates and organizers. The Philadelphia Inquirer columnist Will Bunch published an opinion piece where he criticized Sherrill's characterizations of protesters as "outside agitators," arguing traveling between states is not evidence of wrongdoing and saying characterizing protesters as outside agitators resulted in an "over-the-top police response" that was characterized by Reporters Without Borders as "repression typical of an authoritarian regime."

== See also ==
- Hostile foreign forces - Similar term used in China
- Third Force - Similar term used in South Africa
- Fifth column
- Paid protester
- Crisis actor#Conspiracy theories and defamation
