= Delaney Hall =

Prison in Newark, New Jersey, United States

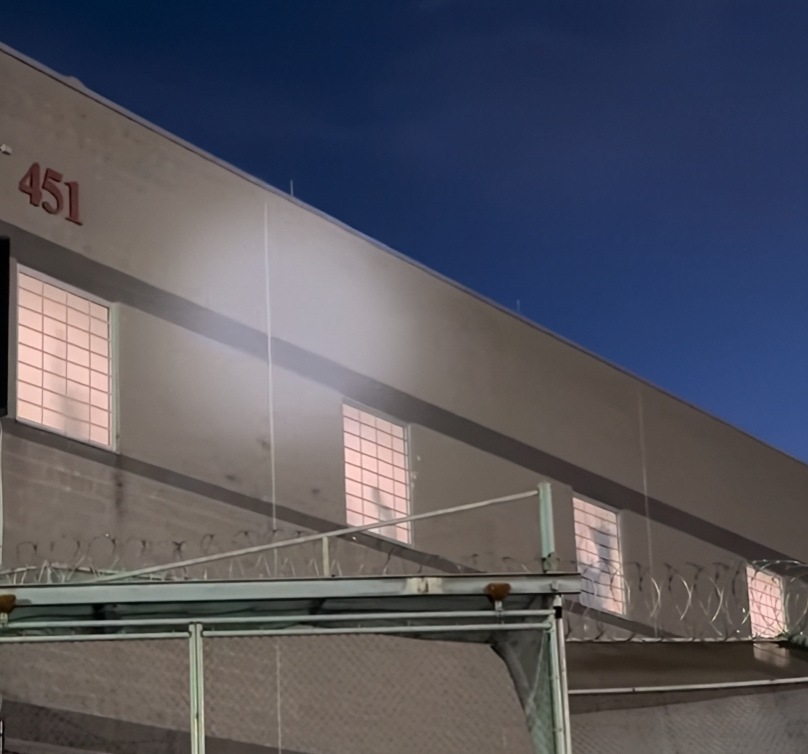
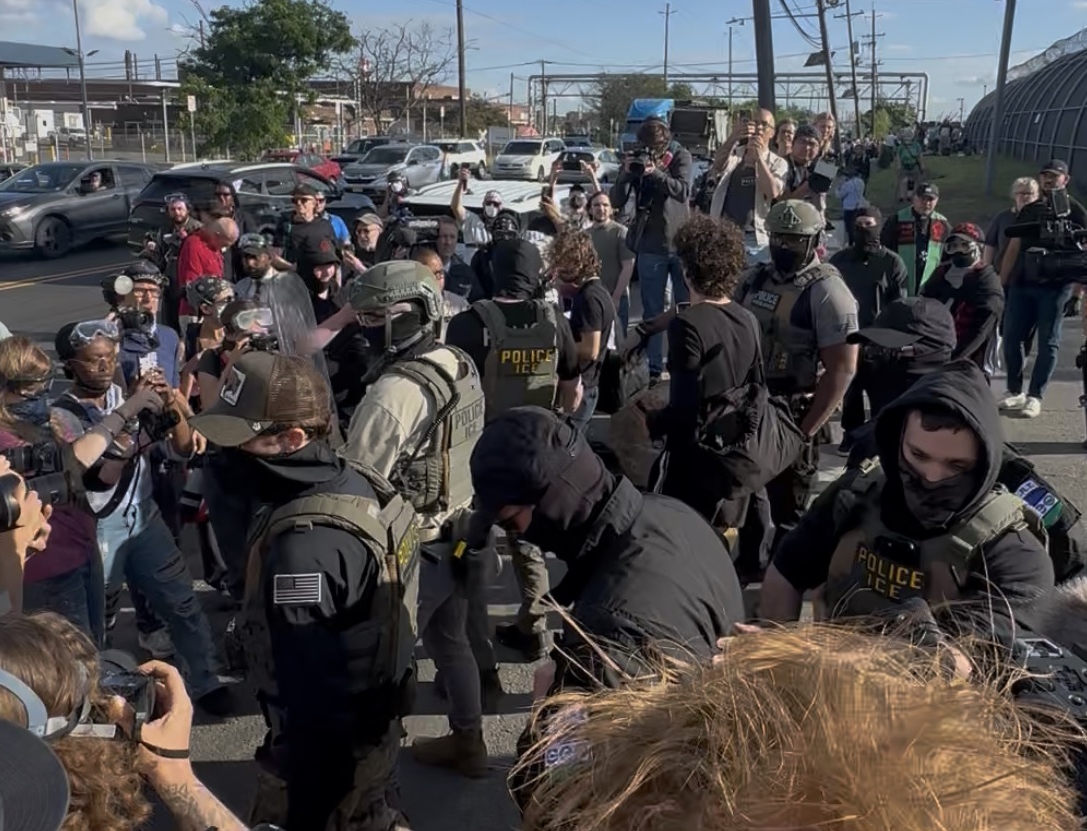
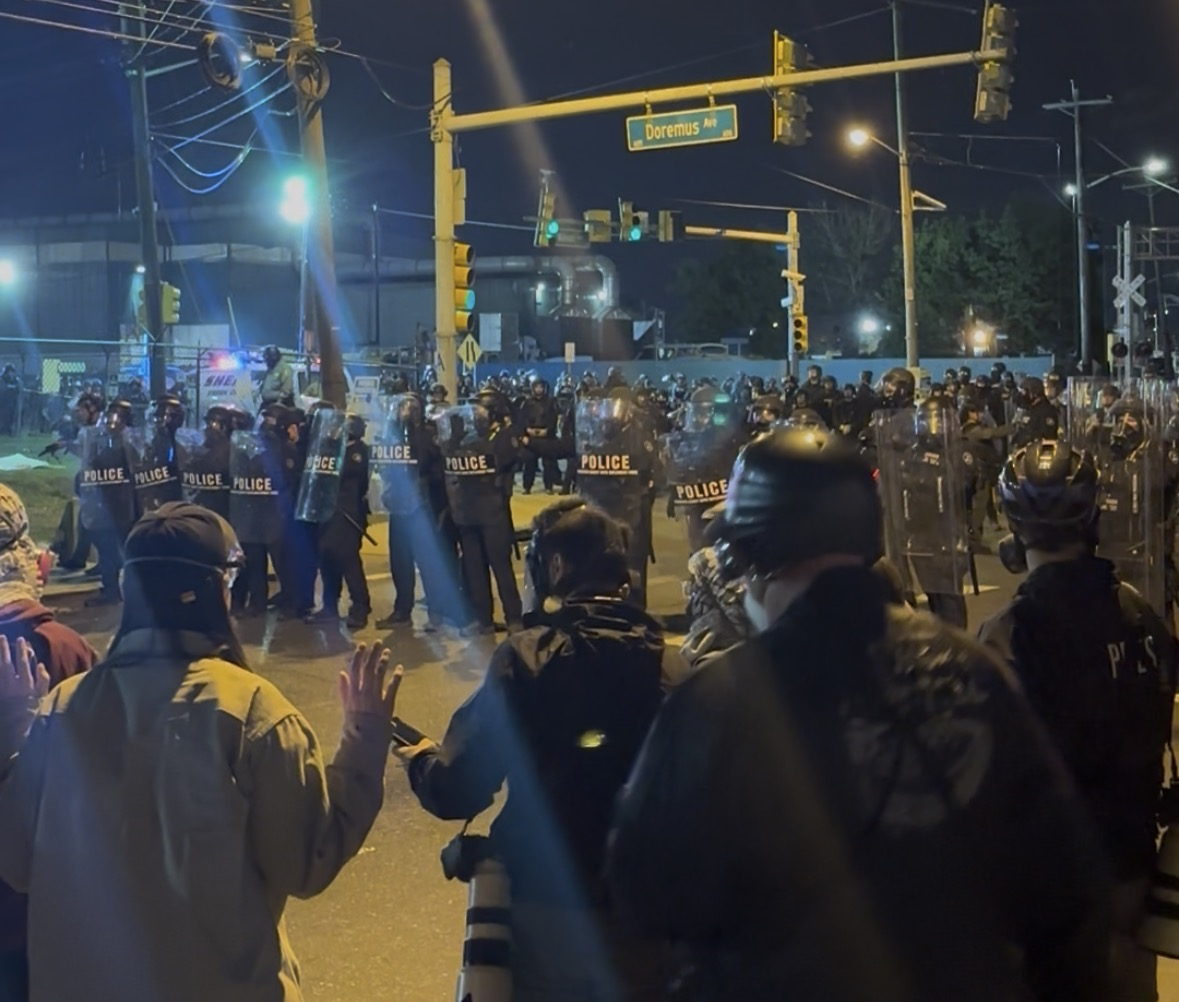
- Detainees wave at protesters from windows, May 25; ICE agents outside the facility, May 28; Riot police outside the facility, May 31, 2026
- Interactive map of Delaney Hall
- Location: 451 Doremus Avenue Newark, New Jersey, U.S.; 40°43′05.2″N 74°07′42.6″W
- Status: Open
- Security class: Minimum–medium
- Capacity: 1,196
- Opened: 2011–2017; 2023 (closed); 2025 (re-opened)
- Managed by: GEO Group
- Website: https://www.geogroup.com/facilities/delaney-hall/

Delaney Hall is a facility used for immigrant detention in Newark, New Jersey, United States. The private prison is managed by the GEO Group under contract for U.S. Immigration and Customs Enforcement (ICE), which awarded GEO Group a US$1 billion contract for 15 years. Delaney Hall previously held immigrant detainees from 2011 to 2017. The facility re-opened in 2025 and has an authorized capacity of up to 1,196.

It is the largest facility of its type on the East Coast of the United States and the largest of the two in New Jersey, the other being the Elizabeth Detention Center. Both facilities are located near Newark Liberty International Airport and are used for the entire New York metropolitan area. It is located in an industrial area of Newark, neighbored by a natural-gas plant, a sewage-treatment facility, and an animal-fat–rendering plant amongst other facilities.

Delaney Hall has received significant media attention due to the arrest of the mayor of Newark during an oversight visit, poor facility living conditions and allegations of abuse by guards, a death in the facility as well as multiple hospitalizations, and detainee escapes from the facility over allegations of poor conditions. Detainees held a 30-day hunger strike which led to an escalation of protests outside the facility, leading to violent clashes between ICE agents and protesters blocking vehicles from entering the facility, as well as arrests of protesters and journalists and retaliation against strikers inside the facility.

== Background and operation before 2025 ==
Delaney Hall opened in 2000 and had been used to house federal, state, and county detainees. It was named to honor Geraldine O. Delaney, a pioneer in New Jersey drug and addiction treatment. While initially designed as a 250-bed rehabilitation center, the facility later transitioned to a high-capacity detention center operated by the GEO Group. GEO Group operated the facility from 2011 to 2017, at the time having a 450 capacity for immigrant detainees. It was then used as a drug rehabilitation center and halfway house until 2023, when it was vacated. In 2021, New Jersey passed legislation prohibiting local jails and private facilities from housing immigrant detainees. It was challenged in court and in 2023, the statute was struck down.

== Reopening in 2025 ==
The Geo Group entered into a 15-year contract with US Immigration and Customs Enforcement to operate the facility, which was announced on February 26, 2025. Caleb Vitello, then-acting Director of ICE, stated, "The location near an international airport streamlines logistics, and helps facilitate the timely processing of individuals in our custody as we pursue President Trump’s mandate to arrest, detain and remove illegal aliens from our communities.”

Soon after, Mayor of Newark Ras Baraka, stated that the GEO Group had not complied with standard municipal building and safety regulations. Newark sued the GEO Group in New Jersey Superior Court in March, alleging that the facility did not have a valid certificate of occupancy (CO). In April, the case was transferred to federal court, where a judge was weighing Newark's request to close the facility "pending inspection and compliance with local, State, and administrative codes". When it opened in May 2025, the GEO Group stated that the certificate of occupancy issued in 2007 was still valid. That assessment is challenged by the city. In May 2025, Mayor Baraka's office stated, "The Health Department found minor violations at Delaney Hall that were corrected on-site at the time of the inspection. There are no open health violations."

== May 2025 inspection visit and arrests ==
On May 9, 2025, a confrontation and subsequent skirmish between law enforcement and four Democratic politicians occurred at Delaney Hall, an immigration detention center in Newark, New Jersey, United States.

Ras Baraka, the mayor of Newark, was arrested and charged with trespassing, but the charges were later dropped. LaMonica McIver, one of the three U.S. representatives from New Jersey involved, was later charged with three counts of assaulting or interfering with a federal officer. McIver rejected the charges as an attempt at political intimidation.

== Unrest, escape of detainees, transfer of women detainees ==
On June 12, 2025, following days of Delaney Hall detainees complaining about unacceptable conditions and lack of food, a small uprising occurred and four people escaped the facility after breaking through a sheet-rock interior wall. Two of the men were recaptured after three days. The third was captured shortly after, and the fourth was recaptured on July 18. Following the unrest, around 50 women were transferred from Delaney Hall to El Paso, Texas, where they were held in a tent-like facility opened in 2023.

== Deaths of detainees ==
In December 2025, 41-year-old Jean Wilson Brutus died while in custody at Delaney Hall. According to ICE, "On Dec. 11, 2025, Brutus entered ICE custody. He had no signs of distress during intake nor a medical history of cardiovascular issues." Roughly one day after arriving at Delaney Hall, ICE said that Brutus suffered a "medical emergency". He was brought to University Hospital in Newark, where he was pronounced dead. The reason for death has been described inconclusive.

In August 2026, Salvadoran immigrant Edwin Lopez-Cornejo, 41, died while in custody. ICE said that Mr. Lopez-Cornejo was pronounced dead in August 2026 at University Hospital after he experienced a medical emergency at Delaney Hall. The cause of his death was not known.

== Hunger strike and protests ==
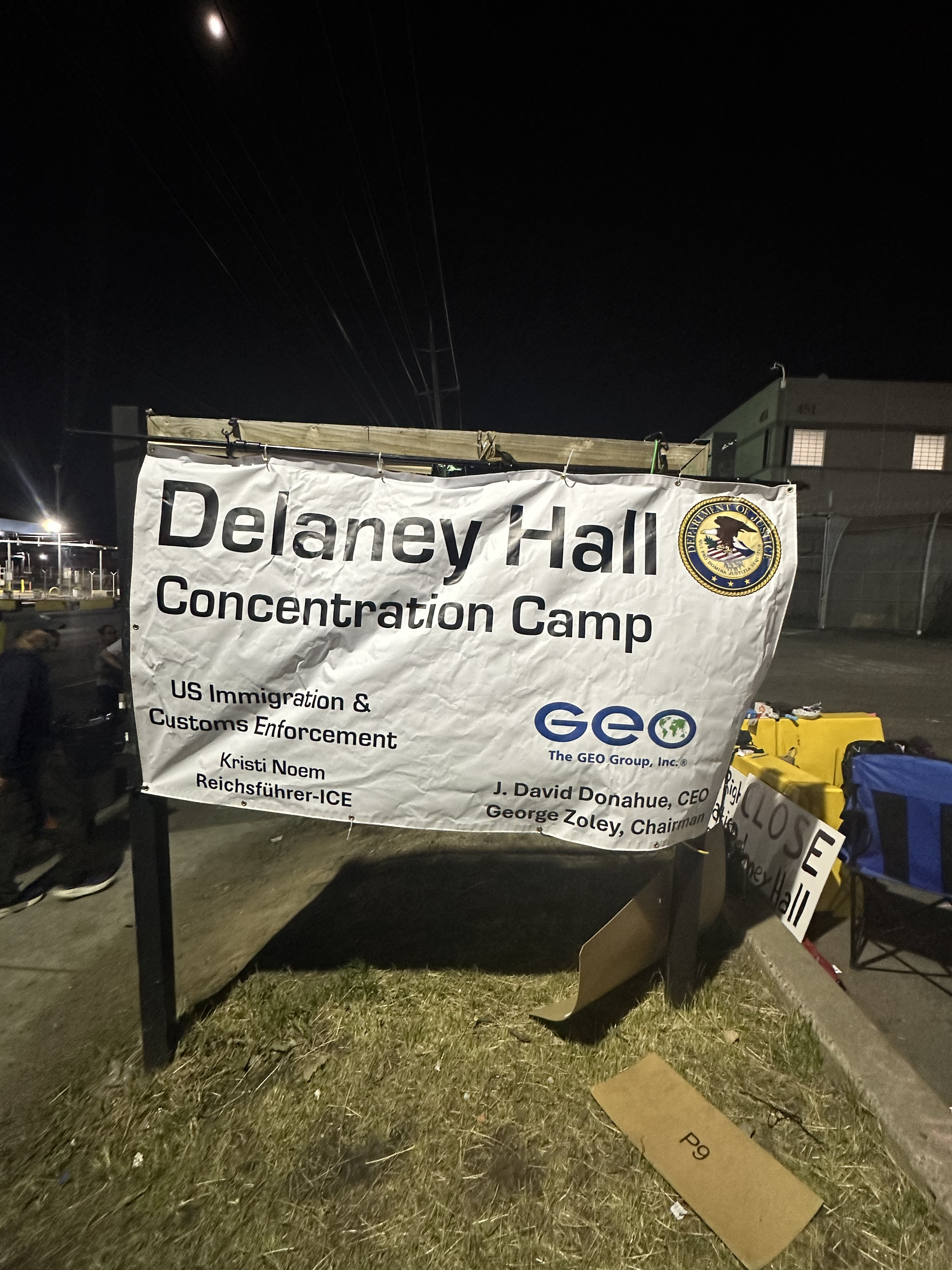
By row:
- Banner drop outside the facility
- ICE agents clash with protesters outside the facility
- 3 and 4: Riot police clash with protesters outside the facility, May 2026

On May 22, 2026, in Newark, New Jersey, immigrants detained in Delaney Hall, a private prison run by GEO Group used for holding immigrants detained by Immigration and Customs Enforcement (ICE), held a month-long hunger and labor strike protesting conditions inside the facility. Detainees have been given expired food with worms or mold, sleep on the floor in overcrowded rooms, have been denied medical care for serious conditions, and have reportedly been abused by guards. Protests outside the facility in support of the strikers quickly escalated, resulting in over 90 arrests. Conditions inside the facility worsened, with reports of batons, pepper spray, and tear gas being used against strikers and multiple ambulances arriving at the facility throughout the strike. The strikes ended due to actions taken by guards to intimidate, segregate, and discipline strikers, such as by putting strike leaders in solitary confinement, threatening to force-feed strikers, and transporting strikers to unknown facilities around the country.

Some black bloc protesters blocked ICE vehicles from entering or exiting the facility. ICE agents attacked protesters and journalists with batons, pepper spray, and tasers, in many cases singling out and detaining protesters or pushing protesters into oncoming traffic. Local officials including Governor Mikie Sherrill (D) were denied access to the facility, and Senator Andy Kim (D) was pepper sprayed by ICE while trying to de-escalate.

Governor Sherrill ordered the New Jersey State Police (NJSP) to take over operations outside the facility for ICE, and she also established "protest zones" for protesters to move inside, while Newark mayor Ras Baraka (D) established an overnight curfew surrounding Delaney Hall. Riot police were then repeatedly deployed and used batons, pepper spray, tear gas, flash grenades, rubber bullets, horseback police, SWAT teams, armored vehicles, and undercover police to disperse, kettle, arrest, and criminally charge protesters who refused to leave, with many journalists being injured and arrested.

The Department of Homeland Security (DHS) has characterized protesters as being outside agitators and rioters, saying "There is NO hunger strike at Delaney Hall. There are NO subprime conditions or abuse at the facility." Governor Sherrill accused some protesters of being from "national extremist groups" without naming specific groups, and Mayor Baraka has criticized both protesters and police, saying the police's actions were "in some cases, unconstitutional." Municipal, state, and federal actions have sparked significant backlash from the political left and advocacy groups, such as the American Civil Liberties Union, the Committee to Protect Journalists, and Reporters Without Borders, who characterized the government's actions as "repression typical of an authoritarian regime."

== Population ==
A New York Times analysis reported that in early April 2026, Delaney Hall was holding 591 prisoners: 76 of them had criminal convictions and 123 faced criminal charges, according to government data. The data countered the DHS/ICE claims that most prisoners were criminals.

Average daily population at Delaney Hall Detention Facility
Fiscal year	ADP
FY 2010	395
FY 2011	510
FY 2012	911
FY 2013	829
FY 2014	852
FY 2015	536
FY 2016	539
FY 2017	679
FY 2019	781
FY 2020	506
FY 2025	234
FY 2026	905

== See also ==
- Deportation in the second Trump administration
- List of immigrant detention sites in the United States
- Prison–industrial complex
