= Newark Police Division =

- Abbreviation: NPD
- Motto: "Trust Integrity Partnership"

Agency overview
- Formed: January 1668
- Employees: 1,300

Jurisdictional structure
- Operations jurisdiction: Newark, New Jersey, USA
- Area: 26 square miles (67 km^{2})
- Population: 281,402
- General nature: Local civilian police

Operational structure
- Headquarters: Newark, New Jersey, U.S.
- Public Safety Director responsible: Emanuel Miranda Sr
- Agency executive: Chief Sharonda Morris

Website
- newarkpublicsafety.org/npd

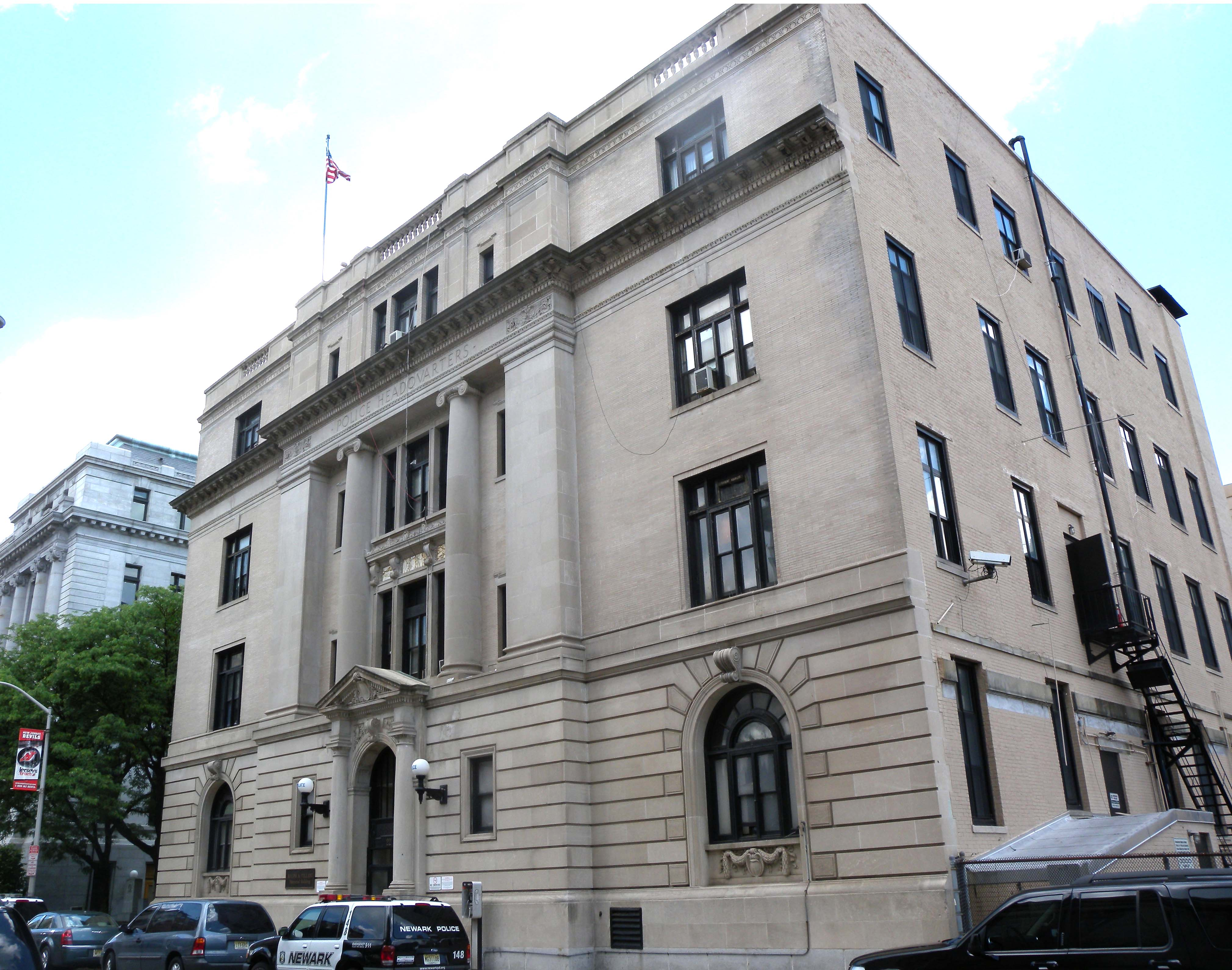
Former NPD headquarters at Government Center

The Newark Police Division (NPD) is the police unit of the Newark Department of Public Safety in Newark, New Jersey, United States. Established in April 1857, it is the primary law enforcement agency serving Newark, and is the largest municipal law enforcement agency in New Jersey. As of December 2017, the division had 1,146 officers.

In 2014, a federal investigation found that the NPD "engaged in a pattern of unconstitutional practices, chiefly in its use of force, stop-and-frisk tactics, unwarranted stops and arrests and discriminatory police actions." As a consequence, the city entered into a consent decree, agreeing to a federal monitoring program and comprehensive reforms of the NPD.

== History ==
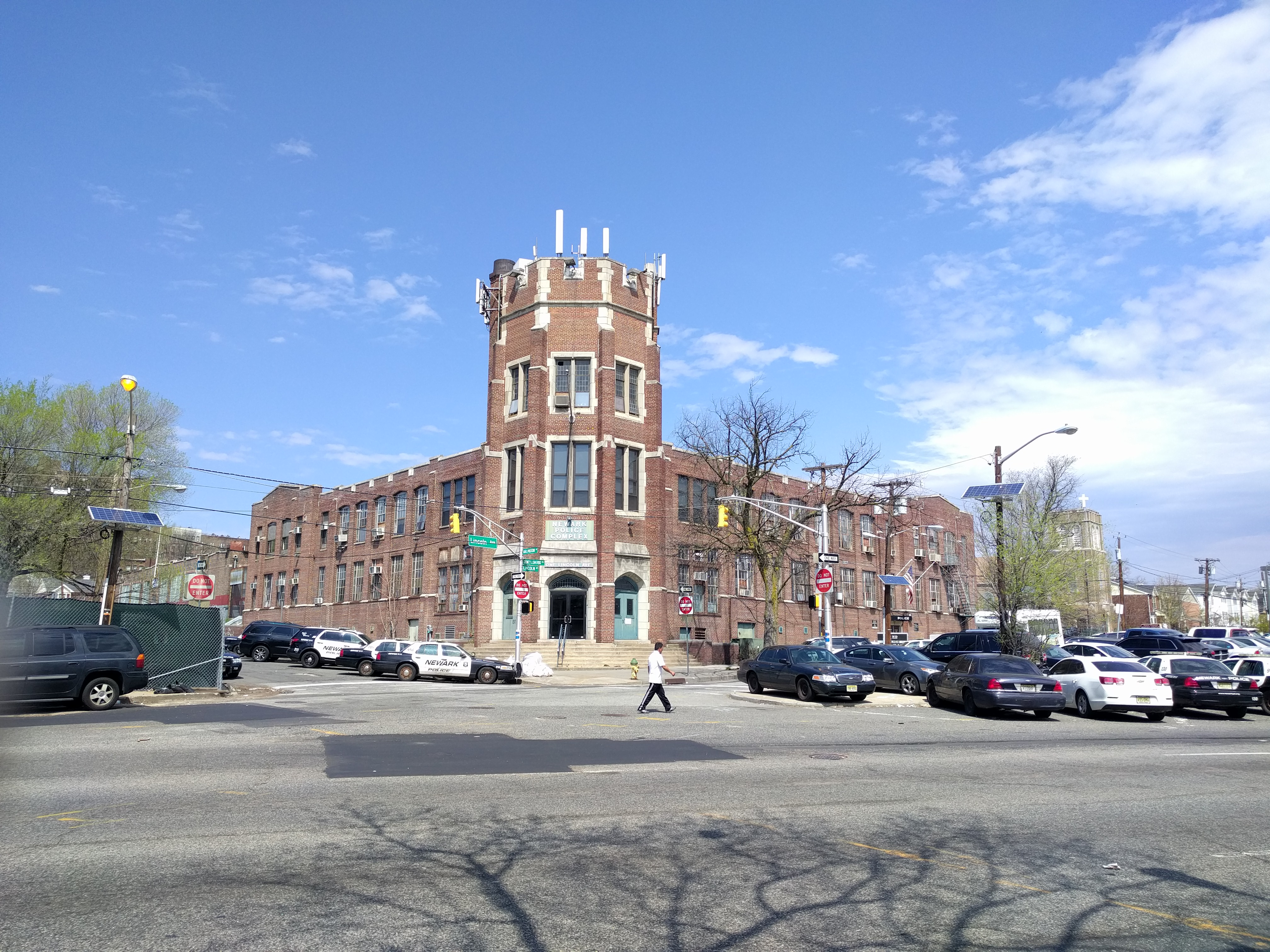
NPD's 2nd Precinct

The foundation for the Newark Police Department dates back to 1681 when two men were appointed as watchmen to preserve peace and crime in the town at night. Eventually, these responsibilities extended to more individuals and a group of seven watchmen were appointed to the four watch districts in Newark. Once Newark became incorporated in April 1836, Mayor William Halsey decided to extend a notion to institute the "City Watch." The City Watch consisted of policemen who were responsible for patrolling the streets of Newark. In 1855, the watchmen were officially associated as the Constables and the Night Watch were those who kept watch at nighttime. In April 1857, the Newark Police Department was established when the municipal police replaced the Night Watch and Constables.

=== Misconduct ===
In May 2011, Officer Hugo Fierro beat a man with his pistol outside a local restaurant. He did not report the incident and the man was not charged with a crime. Fierro was sentenced to five years in jail for the assault.

In March 2012, Officer Johnathan Taylor set fire to his own car as a scheme to collect an insurance payment. He was convicted in January 2014 and sentenced to three years probation.

In August 2013, Officer Suliaman Kamara pleaded guilty in a scheme to defraud the federal government of money meant to house poor people. He was sentenced to three months' confinement.

In January 2014, Detective Ugo Bellomo was forced to resign after a court placed him in a program designed to divert offenders from a conviction. This was as a result of a road rage incident in November 2012.

=== 2014 federal investigation ===
In July 2014, a federal investigation found that the department "engaged in a pattern of unconstitutional practices, chiefly in its use of force, stop-and-frisk tactics, unwarranted stops and arrests and discriminatory police actions." The investigation found that the internal affairs bureau at the NPD was so dysfunctional that it had only sustained one complaint of police brutality over five years.

The city entered into a consent decree, agreeing to a federal monitoring program and comprehensive reforms. At the time, only 12 police departments had operated under federal oversight. Newark mayor Baraka in December announced a new citizen's advisory board composed of civilians and other measures.

=== 2026 Delaney Hall protests ===
The Newark Police Division played a role in suppressing the 2026 Delaney Hall protests.

On Wednesday June 3, the Newark Police Division (NPD) assigned undercover police to infiltrate protests outside the facility. The police assigned were two detectives wearing plainclothes. ICE agents initiated an ambush by flanking protesters with a minivan, exiting the vehicle, and surrounding them, and the detectives then made a targeted arrest against a 30-year-old protester in the crowd. The protester was later accused of dragging tarp into a fire on Saturday May 30.

The American Civil Liberties Union said, "The use of plainclothes officers presents the concern of people constantly being surveilled when they are engaging in First Amendment-protected activity." An uninvolved defense attorney commented "at what point do the actions of these undercover agents become a pressure tactic as opposed to a law enforcement tactic?" The Intercept alleges the NPD's official statement on the operation elides their cooperation with ICE.

== Force ==
The Newark Police Department is the largest municipal police force in New Jersey. In 2011 the size of the police department was reduced by 13% (167 officers) as the result of budget cuts. In November 2013, the NPD re-hired five officers who had been laid off, and another four who had previously worked in Camden. As of January 2014, the force had 800 officers in its ranks. It was announced that month that the city would hire 100 new officers, 50 immediately after they graduate from the police academy, which began in March 2014. In September 2014, 35 new officers were sworn in. The new hires are part of larger plan to expand the force to 1400 officers. In October 2014, Baraka said "We are looking at ways to make our police department more efficient, more responsive to our residents’ needs" and proposed cost-cutting steps to get rid of stipends paid to detectives on top of their overtime payments, make weekends part of regularly scheduled workweeks (effectively creating Saturday to Thursday or a Tuesday to Sunday workweeks voiding weekend overtime). The plan would eliminate gasoline allowances for detectives and stop allowing department vehicles to be available for 24-hour personal use and stop automatic on-call time for police personnel, Baraka hoped to save $2 million annually and plans to use the money to hire 65 new officers in 2015. Baraka said the city also hoped to increase police salaries by two percent.

In April 2014, it was announced that the state police would play a more prominent role in patrolling the streets of the city under the "TIDE-TAG" program.

In July 2014 the mayors of Newark, Jersey City, and Paterson announced an initiative whereby the respective police forces would collaborate in certain areas including the sharing of intelligence about gangs, purchasing power agreements, and providing employment training and job entry programs.

The department is a member of the New York-New Jersey Regional Fugitive Task Force.

The post of chief of police was abolished in 2008, when the chief handled day-to-day operations and the director handled policy. The position was reestablished by the city council in July 2011. The department was headed by police director Samuel DeMaio between 2011 and 2014. Sheilah Coley was police chief between 2011 and 2014. In December 2015, a new position, Director of Public Safety, which would oversee both police and fire departments, was created. On August 5, 2016, Darnell Henry, a 22-year veteran of the Newark police department, was sworn in as chief of the force after serving in an acting capacity for several months.

== Departments ==
- Alcoholic Beverage Control Board (ABC Board)
- Detective Division
- Internal Affairs Bureau
- Patrol Division
- Records and Communications Bureau
- Special Operations Bureau (which includes the Emergency Services Units)
- Taxicab Commission
- Youth and Community Service Bureau

== Precincts and divisions ==
- Headquarters - 480 Clinton Ave.
- 2nd Precinct/Training Academy - 1 Lincoln Ave. - North Ward
- 3rd Precinct - 649 Market St. - Ironbound District -East Ward
- 4th Precinct - 247 16th Ave. - West Ward
- 5th Precinct - 480 Clinton Ave. - South Ward
- 6th Precinct - 491 Irvington Ave. - West Ward/Ivy Hill/Vailsburg
- 7th Precinct - 159 North 10th St. - North Roseville Section/West of Branch Brook Park
- 9th Precinct - 22 Franklin St.
- Administration Bureau.
- Auto Squad Division - 22 Franklin St.
- Communications Bureau - 311 Washington St.
- Internal Affairs Bureau - (IAD) - 494 Broad St.
- Records and Reports - 22 Franklin St.
- Property and Procurement Section - 104 Arlington St.
- Metro Division (Traffic/Downtown Enforcement) - 189 Market St.
- Licensing Division (Firearms Permits) - 22 Franklin St.
- General Crimes Division (Which Includes The Narcotics Squad)
- Major Crimes Division
- S.A.R.A (Sex Crimes) - 360 Clinton Ave.
- Office Violence Prevention - 10 17th Ave.
- C.F.D Command (Community Focus Division).
- Alcohol Beverage Control Unit
- NPD Taxi Unit
- Special Operations (Emergency Services Unit- ESU) Division

== See also ==
- List of law enforcement agencies in New Jersey
- Garry McCarthy
- Newark Fire Department
- Police v. City of Newark
