= Paid protester =

Paid protesters or professional protesters (Note: Not to be confused with professionals who protest.) are people who participate in public outrage or objection in exchange for payment. The expression may be directed against individuals, organizations and governments or against protests against the government with the aim of breaking up or discrediting a protest. In some contexts, people may be hired for optics to show increased public participation in the democratic process, as part of larger astroturfing tactics. Two parliaments have debated paid protesting, the Kyrgyz parliament and the Indian parliament, and allegations without evidence were frequently made by the President of the United States Donald Trump and his supporters throughout his presidencies.

The larger the crowd, the less likely is it that they entirely consist of professional or paid protesters. Paid protesters may not be aware of the matter in consideration. Similar terms that have been used to refer to similar concepts include paid protest, rent-a-crowd, rent-a-mob, activists-for-hire, protest-on-hire, fake protesters/fake protests and mercenaries.

Conspiracy theories about paid or professional protesters and coordinated protests by groups like the Antifa and "global elites" (i.e. George Soros conspiracies or QAnon) were common throughout the presidencies of Donald Trump, and both right- and left-leaning misinformation circles promote allegations of paid or otherwise organized protesters.

== Examples by country ==
=== Bulgaria ===
During the 2013–2014 Bulgarian protests various accusations were made against groups of protesters and counter-protests being paid.

=== Kyrgyzstan ===
In Kyrgyzstan, the acronym OBON, which expands to "Otryad Bab Osobogo Naznacheniya" in the Kyrgyz language and can be translated as "special-assignment female units", refers to hired female protesters. The benefits of this is that it is a cheap way to populate a protest site as well as reduce the probability of violent confrontation with the police and other security forces. The remuneration for this has also been discussed by Kyrgyzstan media.

=== Indonesia ===
In Indonesia, reports of paid protests surfaced during the 2017 Jakarta gubernatorial election, the 2014 Indonesian presidential election and during the 2001 clash between two Indonesian Presidents Megawati Sukarnoputri and Abdurrahman Wahid.

=== India ===
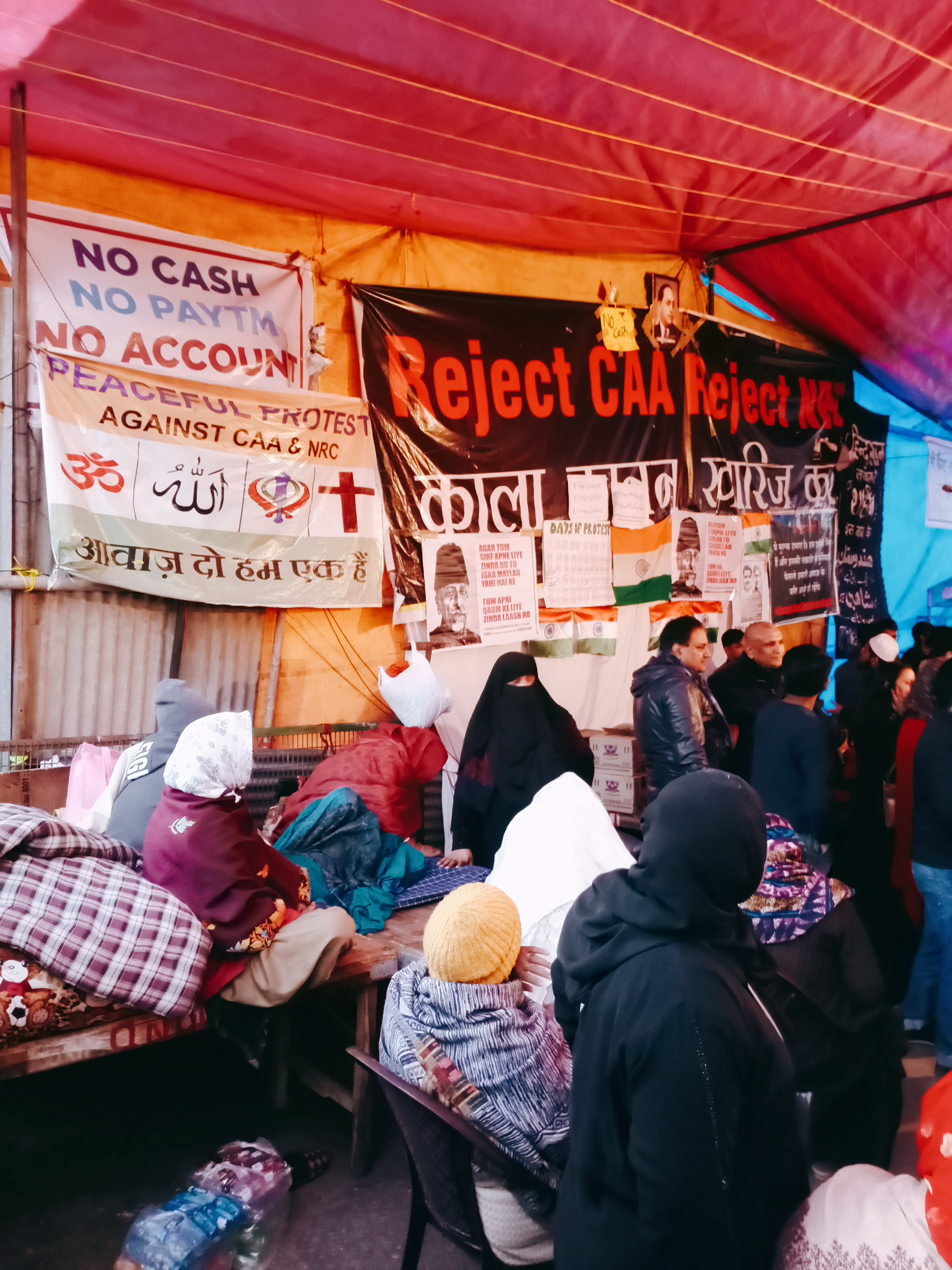
A poster (top left) at the Shaheen Bagh protest reads: "No Cash, No Paytm, No Account" (Don't give money to any volunteers) Photographed, 11 Jan 2020

In 2018, the Additional Solicitor General of India used the phrase in the Supreme Court of India, "We are in an era where there are some professional protesters who like to protest outside the apex court, Parliament, President’s house or Prime Minister’s house. They don’t like any other alternative place for protests". The Shaheen Bagh protests in India were accused of being a paid protest. The protesters in turn put up posters and conveyed through the media that it was not a paid protest and that the protesters were not doing it for money.

=== Pakistan ===
In 2014, protesters in Pakistan told BBC that they were hired to protest for Imran Khan and Muhammad Tahir-ul-Qadri.

=== United States ===
U.S. President Donald Trump often made unfounded claims about paid or professional protesters throughout his first and his second presidencies. For example, he used the phrase "professional protesters" in a tweet following protests against his election victory. Similar accusations were made against participants in the Dakota Access Pipeline protests in 2016 and 2017. There have been public claims of organizations such as Crowds on Demand providing paid protesters, or pay for protesting. Trump's own 2015 campaign launch at Trump Tower was revealed to be stocked with paid actors pretending to be supporters of his candidacy.

=== United Kingdom ===
In the United Kingdom, concerns and accusations related to paid protests have been reported. During the visit of Tamim al-Thani to London in 2018, a paid protest took place outside Downing Street.

== Variants ==
In Indonesia, the term "nasi bungkus brigade" or the "boxed lunch crowd" has been coined to refer to paid protesters. The Hindi phrase andolan jeevis translates to "protest lifeforms". The phrase was used by the Indian Prime Minister in the parliament of India.

== For advertising purposes ==
At E3 2009, the video game company Electronic Arts staged a mock protest involving paid protesters posing as members of a local fundamentalist Christian church, demonstrating against their upcoming game Dante's Inferno, calling it sacrilegious and insensitive. An EA spokesperson later confirmed that the protest was a publicity stunt to promote the game.

== See also ==
- Crisis actor § Conspiracy theories and defamation
- Outside agitator
- Astroturfing
