= Traffic obstruction =

Tactic used during protests and demonstrations

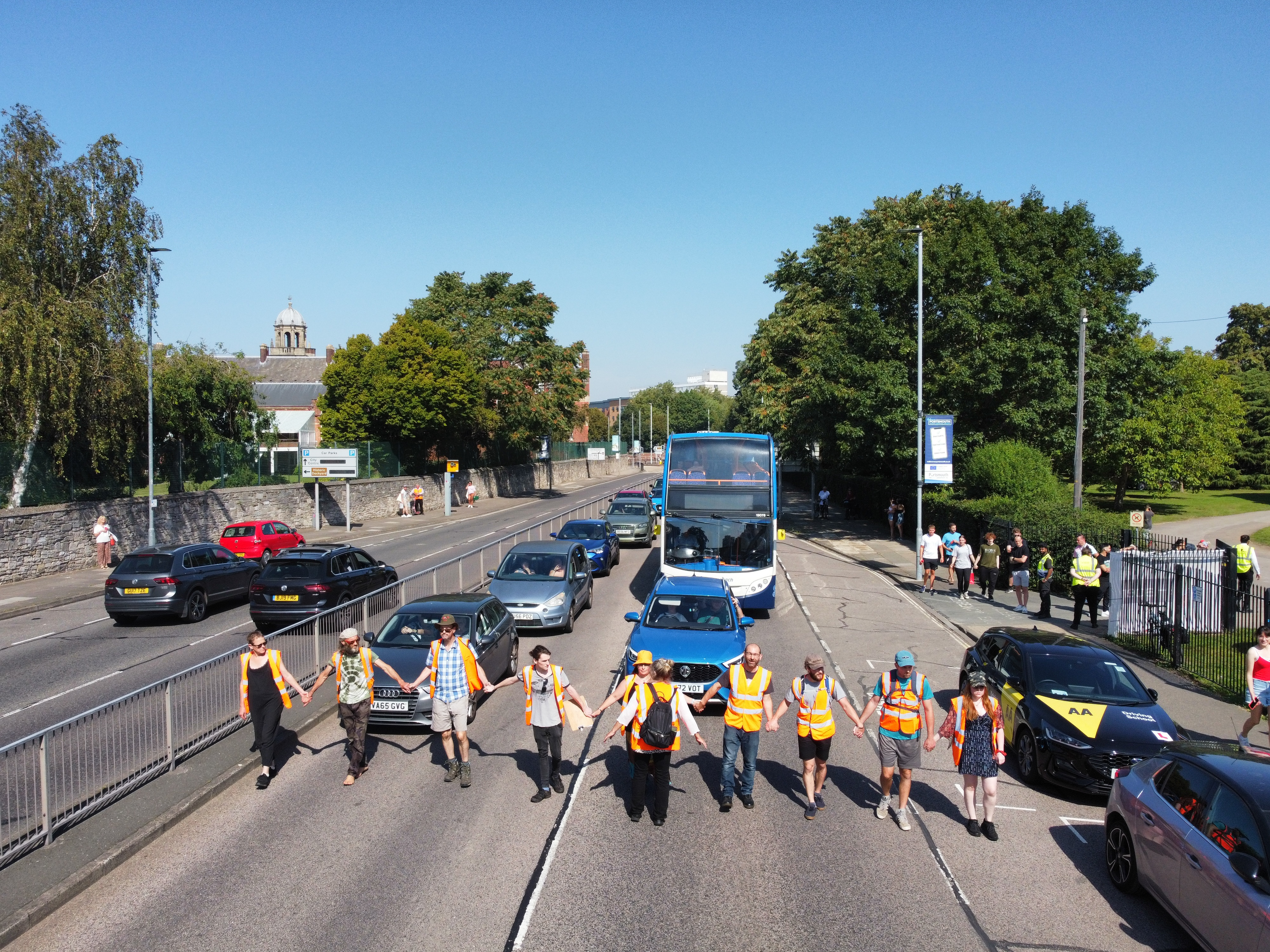
Just Stop Oil protesters on a roadway in Portsmouth, England, 2023

Traffic obstruction is a common tactic used during public protests and political demonstrations.

== Legality ==
In 2020, the Supreme Court of India ruled that the government may not permit protestors to obstruct traffic. The court said that the right to free speech that is granted in a democracy does not nullify the duties of the citizenry.

== Examples ==
Examples of intentional traffic obstructions aimed to articulate a protest agenda include Extinction Rebellion protests, air traffic controller strike, highway revolts, Critical Mass bicycle rides corking intersections, obstruction of rail transport of nuclear fuel in Germany, road blockades by farmers or truckers in France and other countries, impact on Eurotunnel operations by the Migrant Crisis around Calais, pipeline protests (e.g. Dakota Access Pipeline), etc.

On September 18, 2025, during a protest outside immigration court and detention facility 26 Federal Plaza, protesters outside the facility crowded together and blocked a garage that an ICE vehicle was attempting to exit. The Department of Homeland Security (DHS) contacted the NYPD, who sent the controversial Strategic Response Group policing unit to move in and arrest protesters blocking the garage who chose to remain after receiving dispersal orders from the NYPD. Activist and politician Jumaane Williams was the first to be detained outside, and four government officials were arrested in total outside the facility. A DHS spokesperson claimed 71 "agitators" and "sanctuary politicians" had been arrested following the incident. Brad Lander's office claimed more than 75 arrests were made.

ICE agents advance on Delaney Hall protesters in a human chain, striking them with batons and pushing them back, May 27, 2026

Traffic obstruction was used at the 2026 Delaney Hall hunger strike and protests, and Immigration and Customs Enforcement (ICE) agents attacked protesters in response making arrests.

== See also ==
- Highway revolt
- Barricade
- Traffic bottleneck
