= Authoritarianism during the Trump presidencies =

Authoritarian tendencies exhibited during Donald Trump's presidencies

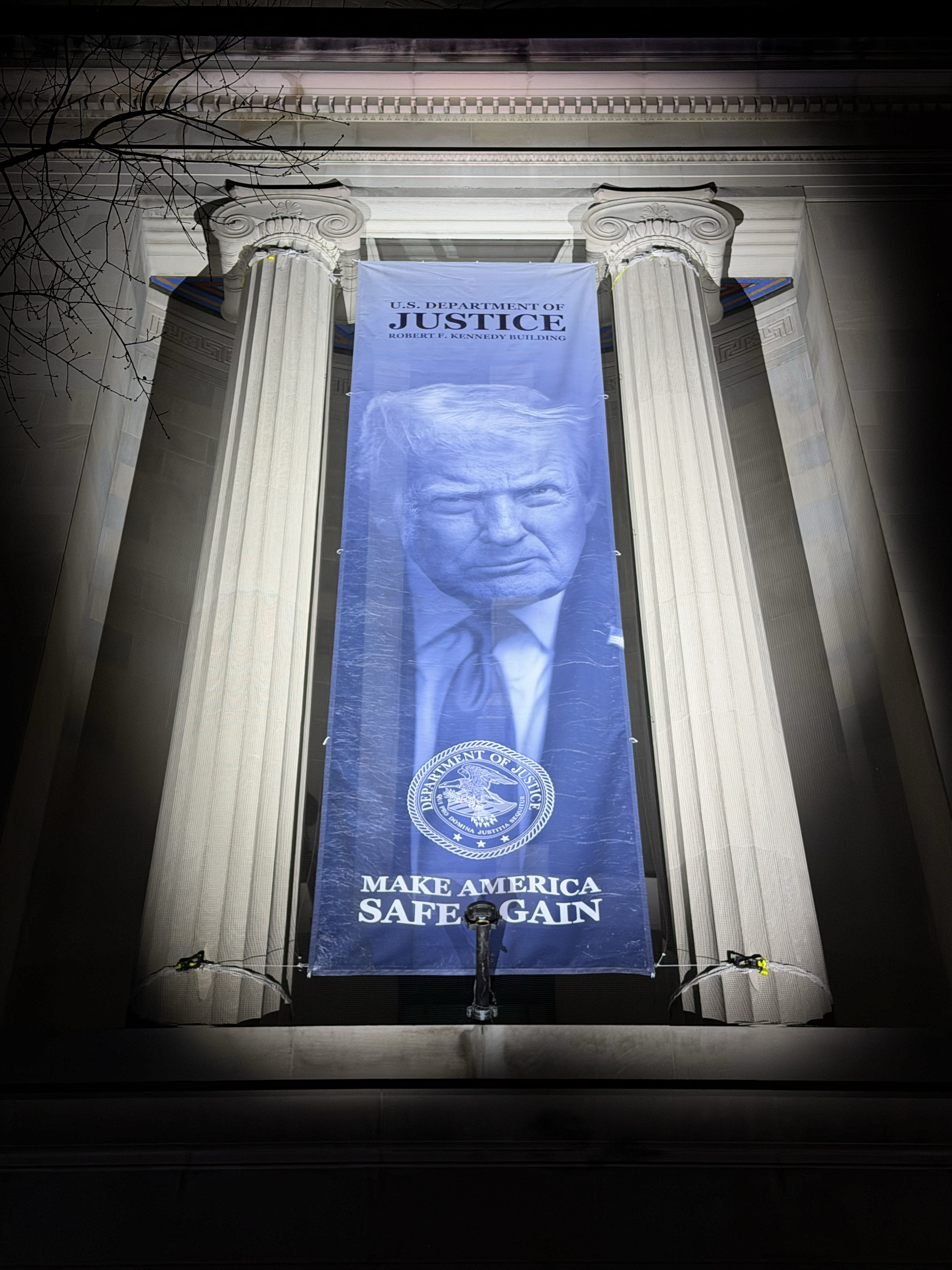
Banner with Donald Trump captioned "Make America Safe Again" displayed outside the headquarters of the Department of Justice, February 2026

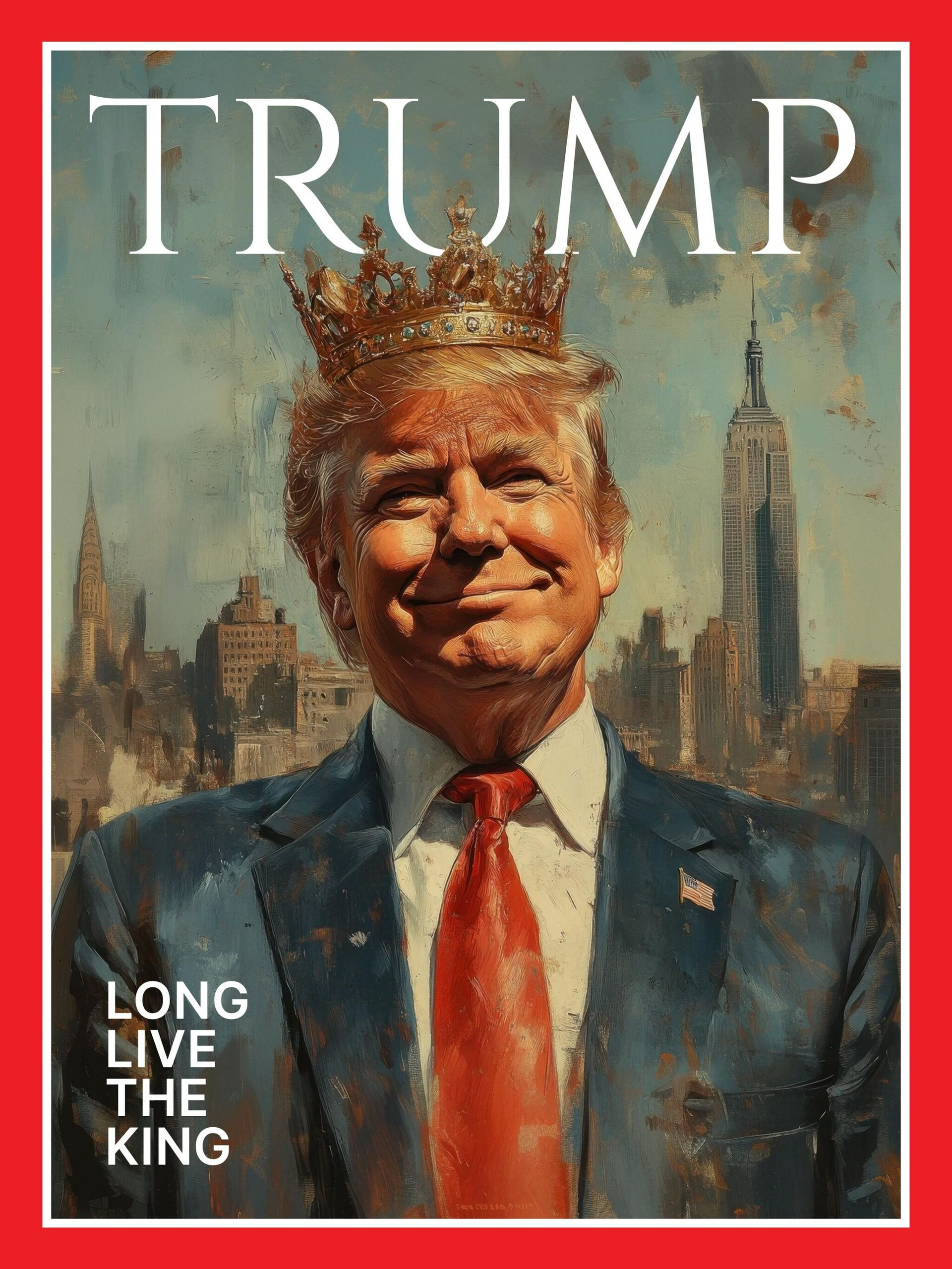
White House social media posted an image depicting Trump as a king, showing the administration's expansive view of presidential power.

The V-Dem Institute uses "electoral democracy" to refer to politicians being responsive to voters and media freedom, and uses "liberal democracy" to refer to checks and balances on executive power and the protection of individual rights against tyrannical rule.

There is significant academic and political debate about the extent to which the United States has embodied authoritarianism during the Trump presidencies. Many scholars classify the US as a hybrid "proto-authoritarian" or competitive authoritarian regime, as opposed to being a healthy democracy or a highly centralized authoritarian regime. This is the result of significant democratic backsliding, which accelerated during Donald Trump's first presidency, plateaued during Joe Biden's presidency, and accelerated again during Trump's second presidency at a faster, unprecedented rate.

Accusations of authoritarianism center around the concentration of executive power, shootings and killings by ICE agents during immigration enforcement operations, controlling information and attacks on the free press, suppressing dissent and crackdowns on protests, aggressive foreign policy, undermining democratic institutions and law, dismantling social protections and rights, corruption, and attacking academia.

== Concepts and strategy ==
=== Democratic backsliding ===
Democratic backsliding is "a process of regime change towards autocracy that makes the exercise of political power more arbitrary and repressive and that restricts the space for public contestation and political participation in the process of government selection."

Countries autocratizing (red) or democratizing (blue) substantially and significantly (2010–2020) according to the V-Dem Institute; the remainder are substantially unchanged.

The 21st century saw the erosion of voting rights and the rise of partisan gerrymandering by state legislatures. The first presidency of Donald Trump accelerated the undermining of democratic norms. A paper published in The Annals of the American Academy of Political and Social Science said, "Trump undermined faith in elections, encouraged political violence, vilified the mainstream media, [and] positioned himself as a law-and-order strongman challenging immigrants and suppressing protests."

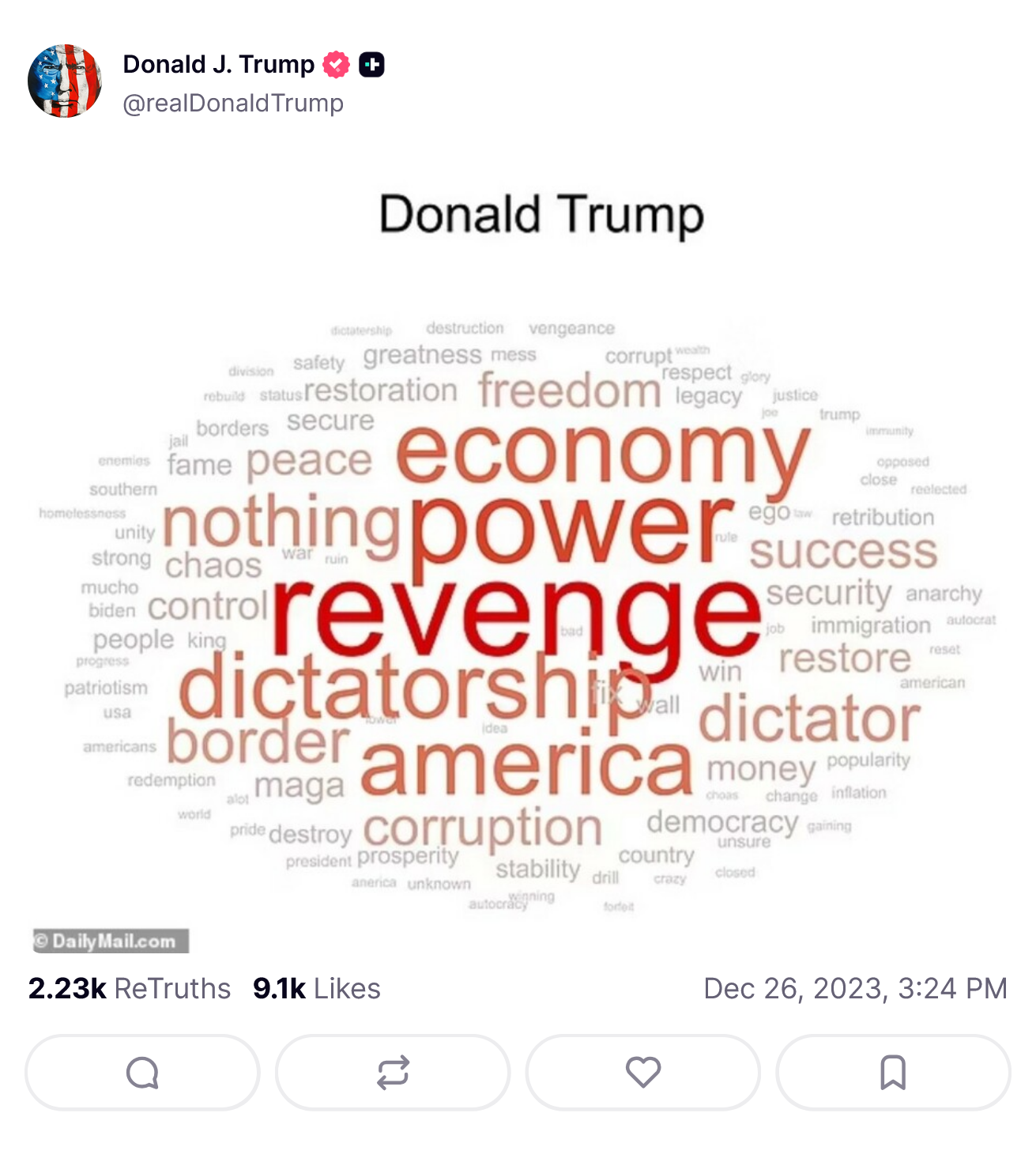
In 2023, Donald Trump posted a wordcloud to his Truth Social account summarizing a Daily Mail poll of words voters associated with him.

Quickly after resuming office for his second term in 2025, Trump became increasingly criticized by political scientists, scholars, and other significant figures for threatening American democracy. Early on, many cited the expansion of executive power and the reduction of agency workforces and regulations by the Department of Government Efficiency as an example of such threats. Freedom House described the pardon of January 6 United States Capitol attack defendants as an attempt to "excuse a violent assault on a key element of democracy."

The V-Dem Institute said in 2026 that "the speed with which American democracy is currently dismantled is unprecedented in modern history." The institute noted executive overreach undermining the rule of law, suppression and intimidation of the media and dissenting voices, loss of legislative constraints, and declining civil rights, equality, and freedom of expression, reaching a 50-year low.

=== Competitive authoritarianism ===
In competitive authoritarian regimes, "formal democratic institutions exist and are widely viewed as the primary means of gaining power, but [...] incumbents' abuse of the state places them at a significant advantage vis-à-vis their opponents." Competitive authoritarian regimes differ from fully authoritarian regimes in that elections are regularly held, the opposition can openly operate without a high risk of exile or imprisonment, and "democratic procedures are sufficiently meaningful for opposition groups to take them seriously as arenas through which to contest for power." Competitive authoritarian regimes lack one or more of the three characteristics of democracies, such as free elections (i.e., elections untainted by substantial fraud or voter intimidation), protection of civil liberties (i.e., the freedom of speech, press, and association) and an even playing field (in terms of access to resources, the media, and legal recourse).

In 2019, political scientists Robert R. Kaufman and Stephan Haggard saw "striking parallels in terms of democratic dysfunction, polarization, the nature of autocratic appeals, and the processes through which autocratic incumbents sought to exploit elected office" in the United States under Trump compared to other backsliding countries (Venezuela, Turkey, and Hungary). They argued that a transition to competitive authoritarianism is possible but unlikely. In 2020, Kurt Weyland presented a qualitative model for assessing democratic continuity and reversal using historical data from the experience of other countries. His study concluded that the United States is immune to democratic reversal. In 2021, political scientists Matias López and Juan Pablo Luna criticized his methodology and selection of parameters and argued that both democratic continuity and reversal are possible. With regard to the state of scholarly research on the subject, they wrote that "the probability of observing democratic backsliding in the United States remains an open and important question". According to some Canadian security experts, Canada may reevaluate historically close Canada–United States relations in response to democratic backsliding in the U.S., which could bring instability to the region and compromise Canada's greatest source of intelligence, and Canadian Prime Minister Mark Carney has openly said that U.S.–Canadian relations have entered a new chapter wherein the United States will no longer be seen as a trustworthy partner.

Steven Levitsky found the first two months of the second Trump administration to be the most aggressively and openly authoritarian case of democratic backsliding that he has seen, expressing particular concern about attacks on the courts. In September 2025, Ray Dalio, the founder of Bridgewater Associates, has warned that the United States was heading towards 1930s-style authoritarian policies.

=== Proto-authoritarianism ===
Beginning in October 2025, The New York Times editorial board published an Autocracy Index showing erosion of US democracy using various benchmarks, offering "a way to understand how much Mr. Trump is eroding American democracy" since his January 2025 inauguration.

Professor Christina Pagel mapped the first actions of the Trump administration in a Venn diagram that identifies "five broad domains that correspond to features of proto-authoritarian states." These five domains are undermining democratic institutions and the rule of law, dismantling federal government, dismantling social protections and rights, enrichment and corruption, suppressing dissent and controlling information, attacking science, environment, health, arts, and education, particularly universities, aggressive foreign policy, and global destabilization.

=== Unitary executive theory ===
Unitary executive theory is a theory of United States constitutional law holding that the president, as head of the federal government's executive branch, must retain sole authority over executive administration and officials, structurally centralizing control within a unified hierarchy. Weaker formulations are less controversial than maximalist versions, which face constitutional and practical criticism. During the Reagan era, conservative organizations, including the Federalist Society and the Heritage Foundation, and some Supreme Court justices, most notably Antonin Scalia, began favoring the theory.

Trump exerted more control over the executive than any modern president, citing Article II in 2019, "where I have the right to do whatever I want as president." Before his confirmation as attorney general, Bill Barr supported the theory in a 2018 memo criticizing the Mueller special counsel investigation.

By 2018, five justices on the Supreme Court had been executive branch lawyers from the Reagan and Bush eras focused on expanding presidential power. In Seila Law LLC v. Consumer Financial Protection Bureau (2020), the Roberts Court held 5–4 that the Executive Vesting Clause gives "the entire 'executive Power' ... to the President alone." The dissent said the constitutional text does not say "entire 'executive power'" or "anything about the president's power to remove subordinate officials at will."

This precedent guided Collins v. Yellen (2021), a 7–2 ruling where Alito wrote the Constitution prohibits even "modest restrictions" on the president's removing single-officer agency heads. The Court reaffirmed that precedents found in Humphrey's Executor and Morrison were the only exceptions to this removal power.

The New York Times and The Guardian reported that Project 2025 sought to establish a framework for expanding presidential power during the second Trump administration based on a maximalist and "contested" version of the unitary executive theory. The BBC called Project 2025's application of the theory to independent agencies "controversial." Robert Shea, a former OMB official in the George W. Bush administration, told The Atlantic: "I can't overstate my level of concern about the damage this would do to the institution of the federal government."

Trump v. United States (2024), viewed by some as embracing the theory, further empowered the presidency.

Trump's second term expanded control over agencies and the civil service. He ordered the targeting of political opponents and civil society. He undertook mass firings of employees, inspectors general, and independent agency and oversight board members who might obstruct him.

Legal analysts said these actions set up Supreme Court tests on agencies Congress insulated from presidential control. The Court subsequently ruled in favor of the administration and an expansive view of presidential power.

Under the theory, the administration says the Constitution grants it a right to control or cease law enforcement, which legal experts called a "constitutional power to immunize private parties to commit otherwise illegal acts with impunity." In February 2025, Attorney General Pam Bondi warned career Justice Department lawyers they could not "substitute personal political views or judgments for those that prevailed in the election" and could face discipline if they failed to vigorously defend the administration's policies. Emil Bove sent a similar letter to Danielle Sassoon, triggering a wave of resignations as each federal prosecutor instructed to seek dismissal of the Eric Adams indictment refused to do so. According to Michael C. Dorf, the administration's stance reflected its expansive view of presidential power.

Trump and his subordinates are seen as embracing an extreme version of the theory, under which the administration pursued a revived impoundment power, with Russell Vought and Mark Paoletta citing Article II's Executive Vesting, Faithful Execution, and Commander-in-Chief Clauses as authorizing executive power to decline spending congressionally appropriated funds and as undermining the constitutionality of the Impoundment Control Act of 1974. Impoundment has not been a central feature of the unitary executive, but the administration has tried to extend the theory outward to override this explicit legislative act constraining how the executive interacts with Congress's constitutional power. Though the Supreme Court has not ruled on the extent of the president's constitutional authority, if any, to impound funds, Chief Justice Roberts and Justice Brett Kavanaugh previously wrote against impoundment, and in Consumer Financial Protection Bureau v. Community Financial Services Association of America, Ltd. (2024), the Court wrote, "Our Constitution gives Congress control over the public fisc" under the Appropriations Clause.

In March 2025, the D.C. Circuit held that the president could remove members of the National Labor Relations Board and Merit Systems Protection Board, finding removal restrictions unconstitutional. The theory's impact on federal administration raised concerns over loss of federal expertise.

After stressing the First and Second Bank of the United States as historical precedents to the Federal Reserve, the Court decided Trump v. Cook (2026).

Journalist Martin Sandu and authoritarian politics researcher Alex Norris described the maximalist interpretation of executive power in Trump's second term as president, including sweeping executive orders, the federal funding freeze, actions against political opponents and the media, pardons of those involved in the January 6th Capitol attack, the actions of Elon Musk's Department of Government Efficiency, and the like as an attempted self-coup. The political scientist Lee Morgenbesser argued the actions of DOGE are a form of state capture.

=== Oligarchy ===
The Trump administration has been accused of operating like an oligarchy, a type of authoritarian regime based on the concentration of political power into a small group of people or a dominant single party.

In his presidential farewell address on January 15, 2025, outgoing U.S. President Joe Biden warned that an oligarchy was taking shape in America, which threatened democracy, basic rights, and freedom, aided by a tech–industrial complex in what Politico described as "echoing Roosevelt's language in calling out the 'robber barons' of a new dystopian Gilded Age." Elon Musk, a close collaborator of Donald Trump during his 2024 campaign and head of the Department of Government Efficiency (DOGE), has been described as an oligarch due to his extensive influence on Trump during his second presidency. Musk contributed over $200 million into the 2024 election, creating a Super PAC to promote Trump's campaign. Two-time presidential candidate and progressive leader Bernie Sanders started his Fighting Oligarchy ("Where We Go from Here") tour across America in response to Trump's election victory.

=== Nationalism ===
President Donald Trump was described as a nationalist, and he embraced the term himself. Researchers describe the Republican Party in the 21st century as becoming right-wing populist and nationalist, more specifically classified as neo-nationalist, with strongly anti-pluralist, white nationalist and ethnonationalist themes.{{refn|name=WhiteNat|*"Polity V Regime Narrative: United States (2025)" (PDF). Polity Data Series. January 20, 2025. pp. 12–15.

In a February 2017 article in The Atlantic, journalist Uri Friedman described "populist economic nationalist" as a new nationalist movement "modeled on the 'populism' of the 19th-century U.S. President Andrew Jackson" which was introduced in Trump's remarks to the Republican National Convention in a speech written by Stephen Miller and Steve Bannon. Miller had adopted Senator Jeff Sessions' form of "nation-state populism" while working as his aide. By September 2017, The Washington Post journalist Greg Sargent observed that "Trump's nationalism" as "defined" by Bannon, Breitbart, Miller and "the rest of the 'populist economic nationalist' contingent around Trump" was beginning to have wavering support among Trump voters. Some Republican members of Congress were also described as nationalists during the Trump era, such as Representative Steve King, Representative Matt Gaetz, Senator Tom Cotton and Senator Josh Hawley.

During the Trump era, commonly identified American nationalist political commentators included Rush Limbaugh, Ann Coulter, Michelle Malkin, Lou Dobbs, Alex Jones, Charlie Kirk, Laura Ingraham, Candace Owens, Michael Savage, Tucker Carlson, Mike Cernovich, and Nick Fuentes.

=== Fascism ===
Fascism is a far-right, authoritarian, and ultranationalist political ideology and movement that rose to prominence in early-20th-century Europe. Fascism is characterized by support for a dictatorial leader, centralized autocracy, militarism, forcible suppression of opposition, belief in a natural social hierarchy, subordination of individual interests for the perceived interest of the nation or race, and strong regimentation of society and the economy. Opposed to communism, democracy, liberalism, pluralism, and socialism, fascism is at the far-right of the traditional left–right spectrum. What constitutes a precise definition of fascism has been a long-running and complex debate among scholars.

A number of prominent scholars, former officials, and critics have drawn comparisons between Trump and fascist leaders with respect to authoritarian actions and rhetoric, (Note: Trumpism has been likened to Benito Mussolini's Italian fascism by historians and election experts.) while others have rejected the label.

Trump has supported political violence against opponents; many academics cited Trump's involvement in the January 6 U.S. Capitol attack as an example of fascism. Trump has been accused of racism and xenophobia with respect to his rhetoric about illegal immigrants and his policies of mass deportation and family separation. Trump's base, referred to as the MAGA movement, is sometimes analyzed as a cult of personality. Especially during his second term, several experts of fascism have characterized Trump and his allies' rhetoric and style of governance as authoritarian and have compared them to previous fascist leaders. In contrast, some scholars have described Trump variously as an authoritarian populist, a far-right populist, a nationalist, or of a different ideology.

=== Heritage Foundation projects ===
Project 2025 (also known as the 2025 Presidential Transition Project) is a political initiative published in April 2023 by the Heritage Foundation with the goal of reshaping the U.S. federal government by consolidating executive power in favor of right-wing policies. It constitutes a policy document that suggests specific changes to the federal government, a personnel database for recommending vetting loyal staff in the federal government, and a set of proposed executive orders for the U.S. president to implement those policies.

The project's policy document Mandate for Leadership calls for the replacement of federal civil service workers by people loyal to "the next conservative president" and for taking partisan control of the Department of Justice (DOJ), the Federal Bureau of Investigation (FBI), the Department of Commerce (DOC), and the Federal Trade Commission (FTC). Other agencies, including the Department of Homeland Security (DHS) and the Department of Education (ED), would be dismantled. It calls for reducing environmental regulations and realigning the National Institutes of Health (NIH) with conservative priorities. The blueprint seeks to reduce taxes on corporations, institute a flat income tax on individuals, cut Medicare and Medicaid, and reverse as many of President Joe Biden's policies as possible. It proposes banning pornography, removing legal protections against anti-LGBT discrimination, and ending diversity, equity, and inclusion (DEI) programs while having the DOJ prosecute anti-white racism. The project recommends mass deportation of illegal immigrants. The plan also proposes enacting laws supported by the Christian right, such as criminalizing the sending and receiving of abortion and birth control medications and eliminating coverage of emergency contraception.

Project 2025 is based on a controversial interpretation of unitary executive theory according to which the executive branch is under the president's complete control. Analysts note that the approach would further reduce agency independence and centralize presidential control. PBS News Hour reporting has linked these ambitions to discussions of domestic military involvement, pointing to Trump's deployment of the National Guard to Washington, D.C., as a potential precedent. The project's proponents say it would dismantle a bureaucracy they say is unaccountable and mostly liberal. Critics have called it an authoritarian, Christian nationalist plan that would steer the U.S. toward autocracy. Some legal experts say it would undermine the rule of law, separation of powers, separation of church and state, and civil liberties.

Most of Project 2025's contributors worked in either Trump's first administration (2017−2021) or his campaign for the 2024 presidential election. (Note: 31 of 38 (81%) contributors held positions within Trump's administration or transition team.) Several Trump campaign officials maintained contact with Project 2025, seeing its goals as aligned with their Agenda 47 program. Trump later attempted to distance himself from the plan. (Note: Trump called some of its proposals "ridiculous and abysmal". Critics dismissed Trump's denials due to the plan's involvement of close allies, his 2022 endorsement of the Heritage Foundation's plans, and the 300 times Trump is mentioned in them.) After he won the 2024 election, he nominated several of the plan's creators and supporters to positions in his second administration. Four days into his second term, analysis by Time found that nearly two-thirds of Trump's executive actions "mirror or partially mirror" proposals from Project 2025.

Project Esther is a project of the Heritage Foundation, a conservative think tank based in Washington, D.C., that aims to suppress pro-Palestinian protests and what it classifies as antisemitism. The effort has received support from several evangelical Christian organizations but no major Jewish ones. According to The New York Times, Slate, Haaretz, The Forward, and Jewish Insider, Project Esther does not address right-wing antisemitism.

Project Esther has been criticized for incorporating antisemitic tropes into its rhetoric. It broadly labels criticism of Israel as terrorism and calls for targeting universities, students, and American progressive politics and politicians. Politico described Project Esther as "a lesser-known blueprint from the same creators of Project 2025." In May 2025, The New York Times found that the second Trump administration had called for or acted upon more than half of Project Esther's proposals.

=== Flood-the-zone ===
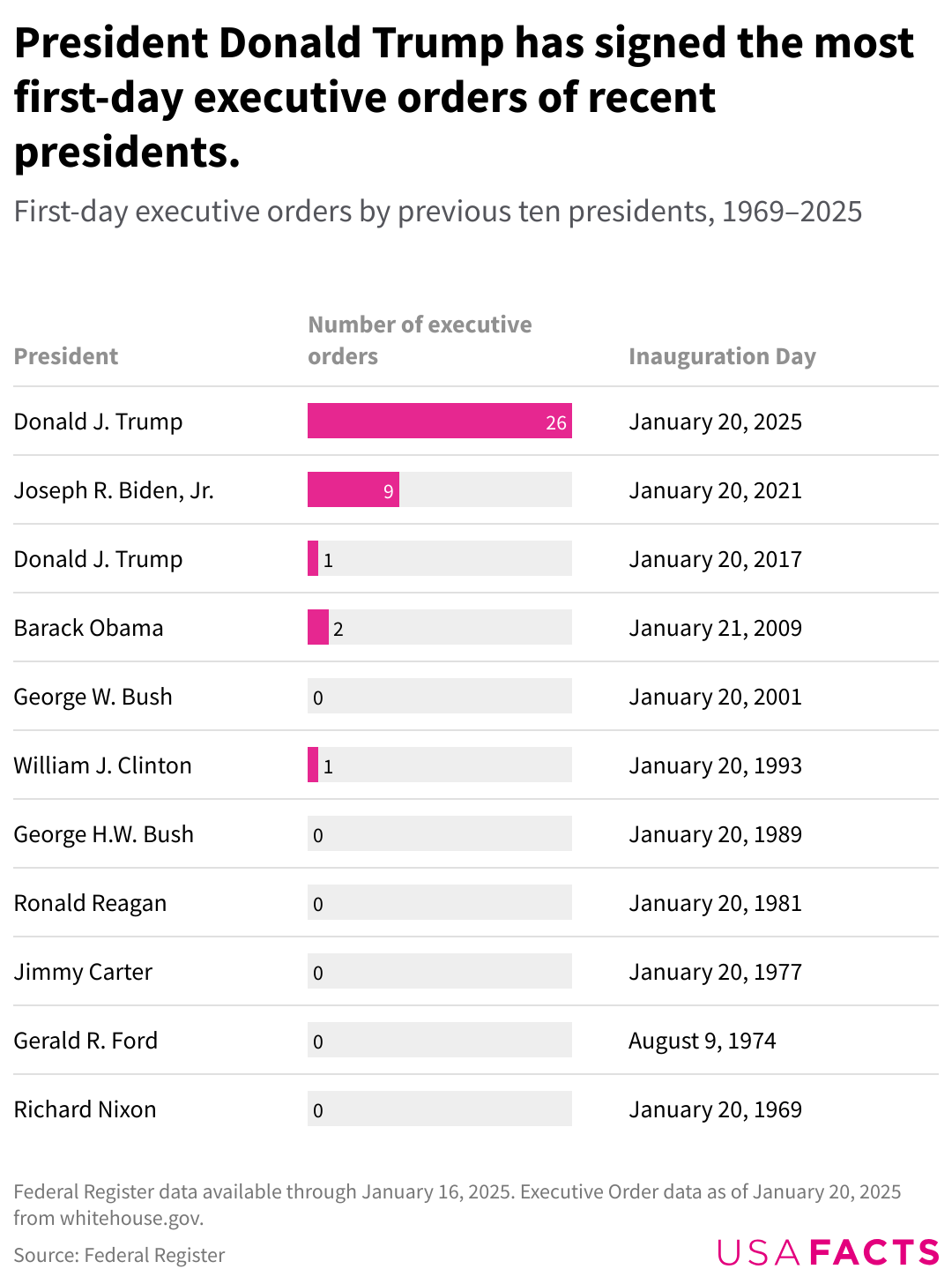
Comparisons between numbers of first-day executive orders

"Flood the zone" is a political strategy in which a political figure aims to gain media attention, disorient opponents, and distract the public from undesirable reports by rapidly forwarding large volumes of newsworthy information to the media. The strategy has been attributed to U.S. President Donald Trump's former chief political strategist Steve Bannon.

The strategy came to public light after Bannon told Michael Lewis in 2018 that "The Democrats don't matter [...] The real opposition is the media. And the way to deal with them is to flood the zone with shit." Trump adopted the strategy during the 2016 presidential election, followed by other right-wing political figures such as Éric Zemmour and Elon Musk.

== Authoritarian actions ==
=== Targeting of press ===
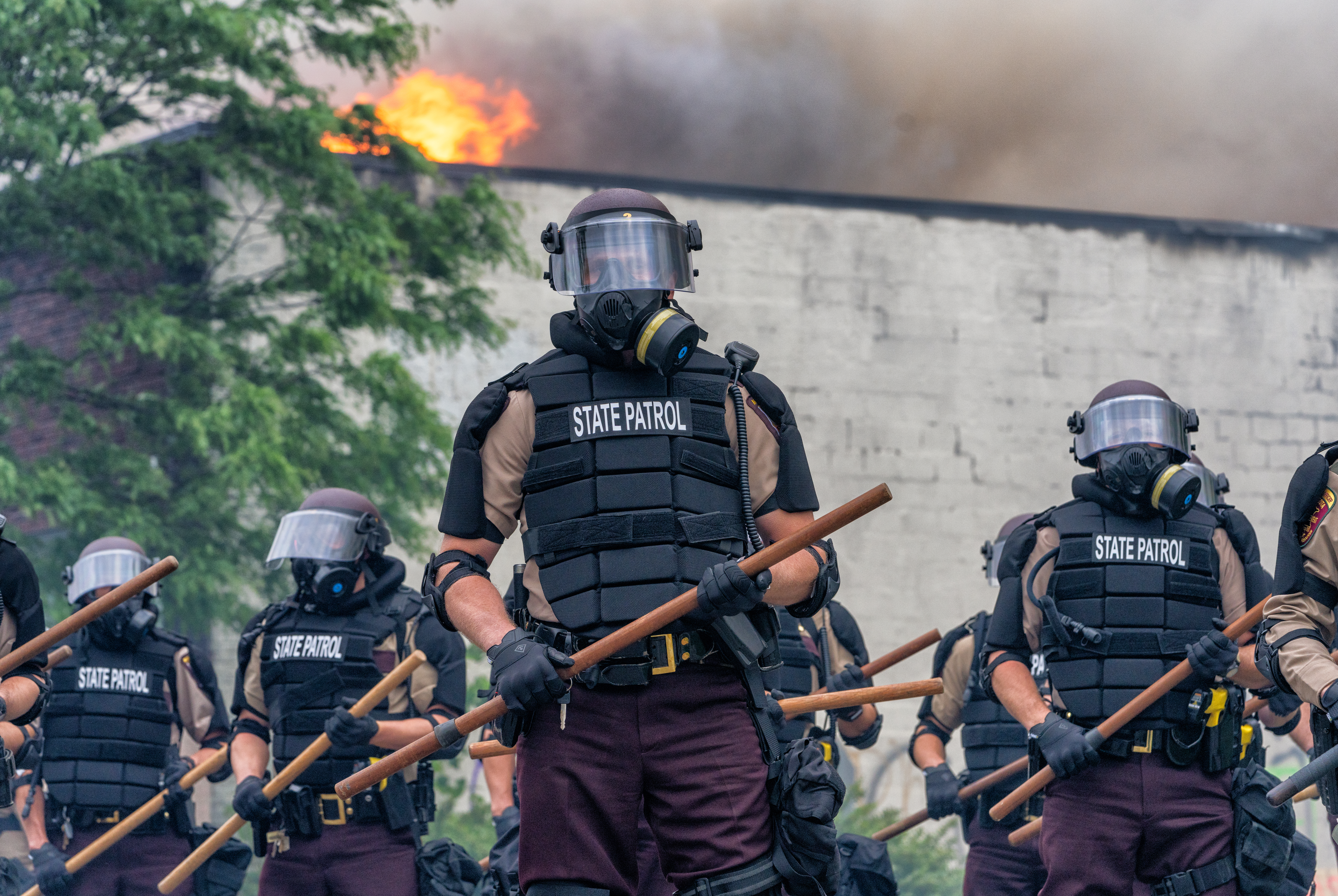
Minnesota State Patrol troopers in formation at a George Floyd protest in Minneapolis, Minnesota, where troopers arrested journalists

Projectiles being fired at journalists and other members of the press during the George Floyd protests in Washington, D.C.

Police tackle and arrest a Fox 7 reporter at a UT Austin pro-Palestine protest.

Attacks against journalists have become more frequent since the Donald Trump 2016 presidential campaign, with journalists — especially those reporting on political news — being victims of assault, equipment theft and damage, detainment, arrest, cyberattacks, and doxxing at increasing rates by police, civilians, and immigration enforcement agents. Trump's actions have contributed to a significant decline in the freedom of the press. (Note: Attributed to multiple references:)

These are widely considered the result of a combination of factors. Recent police attacks against journalists have been widely attributed to militarization of police in the U.S., the degree of influence of pro-Israel lobbies and lobbyists on crackdowns on the Gaza war protests by government and university officials, and Trump's militarization and deployment of law enforcement. Civilian attacks against journalists have increased largely as a result of Trump's legal and rhetorical attacks against journalists who are critical of his platform and due to his role propagating election denial conspiracy theories, often resulting in his supporters taking violent action.

In a Pew Research survey of 11,889 U.S. journalists conducted from February 16 to March 17, 2022, 57% stated that they were "extremely" or "very" concerned about the prospect of press restrictions being imposed in the United States. The U.S.'s Reporters Without Borders (RSF) Press Freedom Index ranking fell from 20th in 2010 to 57th in 2025. According to RSF, "after a century of gradual expansion of press rights in the United States, the country is experiencing its first significant and prolonged decline in press freedom in modern history, and Donald Trump's return to the presidency is greatly exacerbating the situation." During Trump's second presidency, Immigration and Customs Enforcement (ICE) agents have repeatedly assaulted and arrested journalists, especially in connection with escalating anti-ICE protests (2025, 2026). Reporters Without Borders characterized some of the government's actions in response to recent protests as "repression typical of an authoritarian regime."

At the 2026 Delaney Hall hunger strike and protests, Reporters Without Borders said, "These attacks are unconstitutional repression typical of an authoritarian regime" of the May 31 mass arrests/journalist charges.

=== Targeting of transgender people ===
During the second presidency of Donald Trump, the United States government has taken a series of actions to persecute people who are transgender. These actions have been accompanied by anti-transgender rhetoric and misinformation, often to dehumanize and scapegoat transgender people and portray them as a social threat.

The administration has restricted, defunded, and blocked gender-affirming care—especially in the case of minors—as well as research and education related to transgender issues. It has utilized censorship of inclusive language for the purpose of anti-transgender policy and directed law enforcement and the FBI to investigate the promotion of "radical gender ideology". The Trump administration has undergone purges of transgender military personnel, prohibited transgender girls and women from participating in women's sports, discriminated against transgender inmates, and has created restrictions on passports and international travel for transgender people.

The Trump administration's actions targeting transgender people draw much of their design from the anti-transgender movement in the United Kingdom, and form part of the broader 2020s anti-LGBTQ movement in the United States and the anti-gender movement. The administration's actions have been referred to by some advocates as the early stages of genocide similar to that of persecution of transgender people in Nazi Germany, arguing they seek to "marginalize them socially and economically".

=== Targeting of elections ===
Donald Trump's targeting of elections stems from his loss in the 2020 United States Presidential Election, in which he was defeated by Joe Biden. Donald Trump, shortly after his defeat, began spreading conspiracy theories and false information regarding the election integrity of the election, claiming that the election was stolen. His primary arguments for making this claim were because of illegal immigrants voting, dead people voting, mail-in ballots, and rigged voting machines.

During his 2024 campaign, Donald Trump began promoting the SAVE Act, which would require in-person voter registration, proof of citizenship when registering to vote, mandatory photo ID when voting, heavily restricting mail-in and absentee ballots, requiring that states submit their voter rolls to the Department of Homeland Security so that noncitizens can be purged from the list, and criminal punishments for election officials that do not comply with the SAVE act provisions. Donald Trump makes the claim that this bill is a security measure for future elections; however, multiple critics point out that the very strict rules could make many US citizens, most notably married women who changed their last names, ineligible to vote in elections. Critics also point out that the SAVE Act would act as a voter suppression law against low-income and rural Americans who do not have easy access to proof of identification and access to polling locations. Currently, the bill has passed the House of Representatives multiple times, with some provisions of the SAVE Act piggybacking on other legislative items; however, the bill keeps stalling in the Senate.

During Trump's second term in office, he has signed numerous executive orders to target mail-in ballots, ordering the United States Postal Service (USPS) to create a list of approved mail-in voters, creating a standard mail-in ballot envelope design with upgraded security features, mandated non-delivery of unauthorized mail-in ballots, and criminal actions against non-compliance. Donald Trump also signed a separate executive order that would require the USPS to stop delivering mail-in ballots to the 23 states that did not provide the federal government with unredacted voter rolls. All or most of the provisions in his executive orders attacking mail-in ballots have been shot down by federal courts or have faced fierce opposition by states that do not comply with his executive orders.

Apart from the SAVE Act, Donald Trump is also responsible for igniting the redistricting battle before the 2026 United States midterm elections. On July 7, 2025, Donald Trump made a formal request to Texas governor Greg Abbott and the Texas Legislature to gerrymander the congressional districts to help Republicans gain 5 extra seats in an attempt to hold the narrow majority (220-212) Republicans maintained in the 2024 House of Representatives Elections. His reasons for this request were to dilute the voting power of Democrats in Texas, especially ahead of an anticipated Democratic wave year, and to anticipate that further Republican-controlled states would join in on redrawing maps. Although Democratic-controlled states attempted to fight back with their own maps, Republicans are currently forecasted to have a net gain of 10 seats through redistricting efforts.

Donald Trump, during the redistricting efforts, also filed an amicus brief challenging Section 2 of the Voting Rights Act in the Supreme Court case of Louisiana v. Callais. The section prohibits states from racially gerrymandering in order to dilute the voting power of minority voters. After the decision, Donald Trump publicly thanked Justice Samuel Alito for writing the majority opinion. Donald Trump called the eliminating of Louisiana's majority Black district a "Big win" and "the kind of ruling I like."

In October 2026, voters of Florida, Ohio, Texas, and Tennessee reported the voting machines changing to Republican candidates. Stella Parton posted in social media that the machine showed Marsha Blackburn, which became a senator. She reminded her followers to double check their ballot recording.

=== Targeting of civil society ===
During Donald Trump's second presidency, the Trump administration has undertaken a series of actions using the government to target his political opponents and civil society. News outlets described his actions as part of his promised "retribution" and "revenge" campaign, within the context of a strongly personalist and leader-centered conception of politics. During his 2024 presidential campaign, Trump repeatedly stated that he had "every right" to go after his political opponents.

He undertook a massive expansion of presidential power under a maximalist interpretation of the unitary executive theory. Several of his actions ignored or violated federal laws, regulations, and the Constitution according to American legal scholars, the Government Accountability Office, and federal judges. He threatened, signed executive actions against, and ordered investigations into his political opponents, his critics, and organizations aligned with the Democratic Party. He politicized the civil service, undertaking mass layoffs of government employees to recruit workers more loyal to himself. He ended the post-Watergate norm of Justice Department independence, weaponizing it and ordering it to target his political enemies. He utilized several government agencies to retaliate against his political enemies and continued filing personal lawsuits against his political opponents, companies, and news organizations that angered him.

By July 2025, Trump had extracted more than $1.2 billion in settlements in a "cultural crackdown" against a variety of institutions that largely chose to settle rather than fight back. He engaged in an unprecedented targeting of law firms and lawyers that previously represented positions adverse to himself. Trump targeted higher education by demanding it give federal oversight of curriculum and targeted activists, legal immigrants, tourists, and students with visas who expressed criticism of his policies or engaged in pro-Palestinian advocacy. He also detained and deported United States citizens.

Trump's actions against civil society have been described by legal experts and political scientists as authoritarian and contributing to democratic backsliding, as well as negatively impacting freedom of the press, free speech, and the rule of law.

In February 2026, during his State of the Union address to Congress, Trump was publicly criticized by Representatives Ilhan Omar and Rashida Tlaib, who challenged his immigration policies and accused his administration of harming U.S. citizens. In response, Trump posted on his social media platform Truth Social, suggesting that the lawmakers "should be sent back from where they came." Omar, a naturalized U.S. citizen born in Somalia, and Tlaib, a U.S.-born citizen of Palestinian descent, were both widely reported to have been the focus of these remarks. Media outlets and civil rights organizations described Trump's comments as xenophobic and controversial, drawing bipartisan criticism for targeting members of Congress based on their heritage.

==== Persecutions of political opponents ====
Midway through the first year of his second term, Trump made several posts on Truth Social account of Pam Bondi ordering her to prosecute his political opponents, specifically naming Senator Adam Schiff, former FBI Director James Comey, and New York Attorney General Letitia James. Trump stated, "We can't delay any longer; it's killing our reputation and credibility." According to an administration official, the posts were intended to be direct messages and were accidentally posted publicly.

Months later, Comey and James were indicted on charges that were later dismissed. In July 2026, journalists Maggie Haberman and Jonathan Swan reported that Trump told a White House advisor that he did not care whether the prosecution of James was successful and that the only purpose was to drag James into court. "I want to make her life miserable," Trump reportedly told the advisor.

After six members of Congress posted a video advising service members not to carry out illegal orders, the administration investigated the representatives and sought an indictment, but a grand jury declined to bring charges. The administration also convicted John Bolton, prosecuted LaMonica McIver, and indicted Comey again, this time on an Instagram post prosecutors claim was a threat against the president. The Trump administration has also opened investigations into political opponents: Jerome Powell, Tim Walz, Jacob Frey, Gavin Newsom, Jennifer Siebel Newsom, George Soros, Alexander Soros, Jack Smith, John Brennan, E. Jean Carroll, Reid Hoffman, Miles Taylor, and Christopher Krebs.

=== Immigration enforcement ===
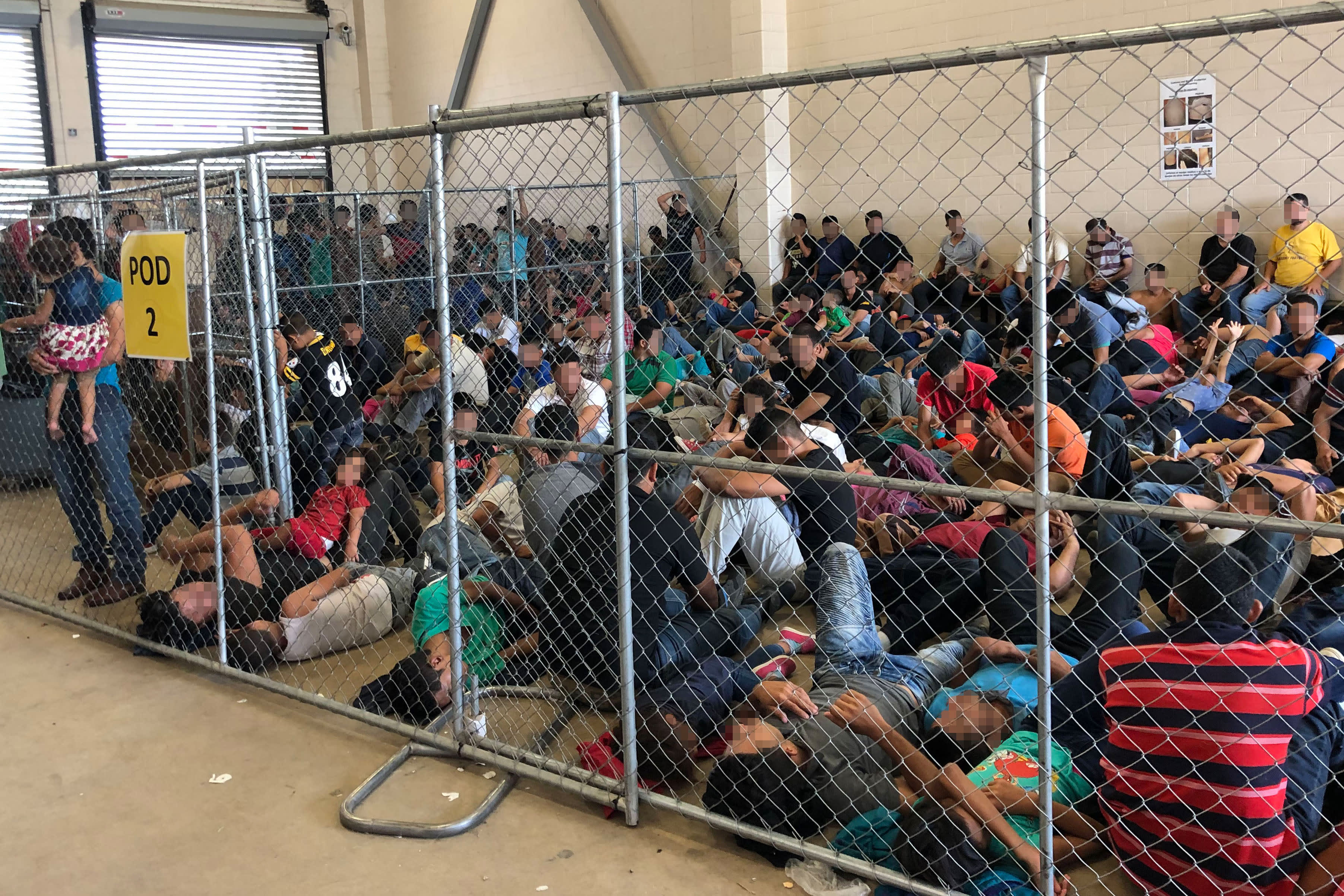
A migrant detention camp in 2019

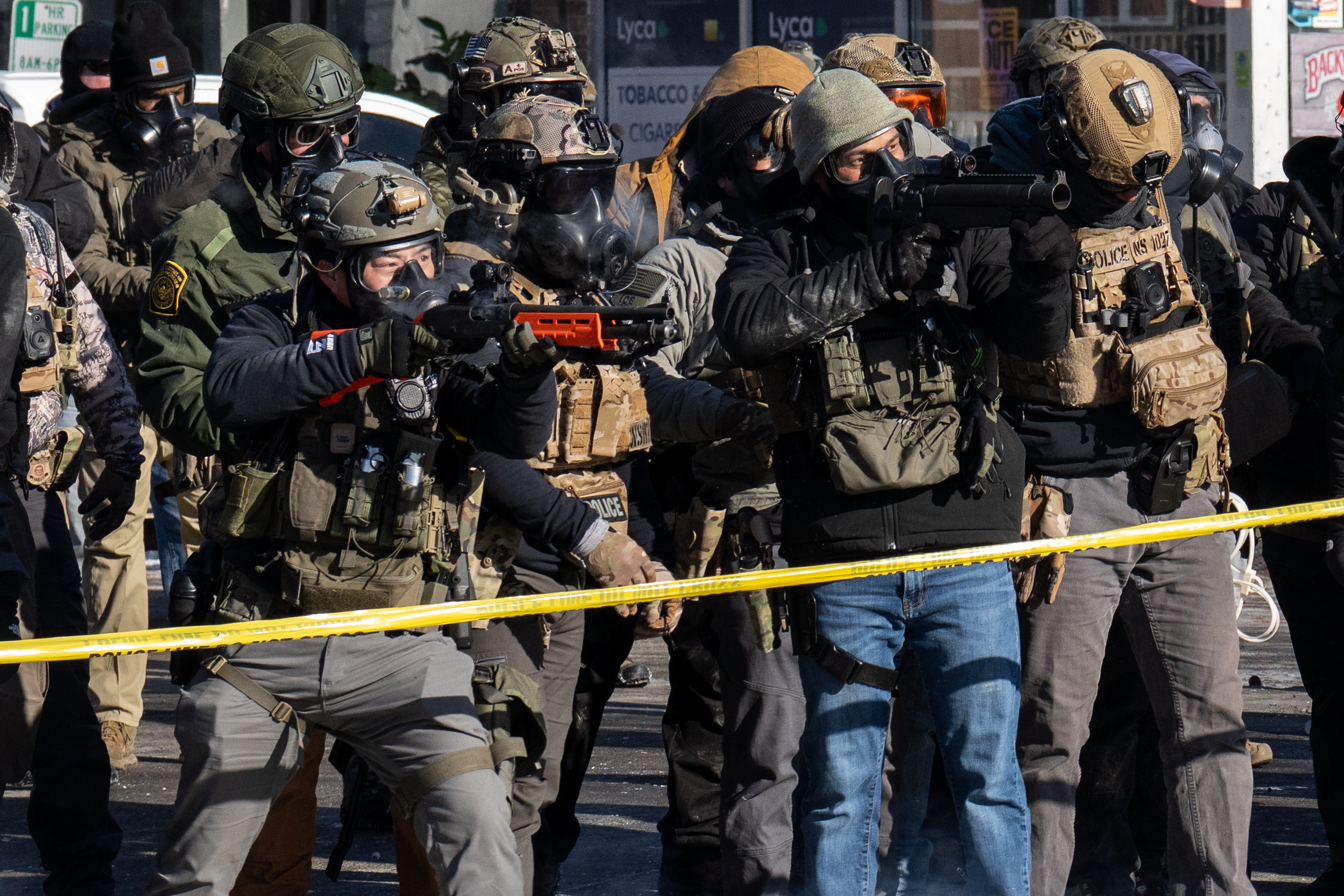
ICE agents fire less-lethals at protesters during Operation Metro Surge, 2026

US citizen Aliya Rahman is dragged from her car and arrested during Operation Metro Surge, 2026

Donald Trump was inaugurated for his second term as president of the United States on January 20, 2025, with one of his key campaign promises being to crack down on immigration. Since then, through a combination of executive orders and policymaking, Trump and his administration have sought to restrict immigration, including declaring a national emergency at the Mexico–United States border, blocking asylum seekers from entering the U.S., expanding the detention of apprehended migrants pending removal proceedings, suspending almost all refugee admissions to the U.S., seeking to restrict birthright citizenship for new children born to parents who are not U.S. permanent residents, and officially designating certain international cartels and criminal organizations as terrorists.

In addition to restricting future immigration, the Trump administration has embarked on campaigns of mass delegalization, terminating the legal status of millions of immigrants with temporary protected status and humanitarian parole; and of mass detention and deportation, vastly expanding the immigration detention and deportation operations conducted by the Department of Homeland Security. Trump also signed the Laken Riley Act on January 29, 2025, which mandates the detention, without bond, of immigrants who are arrested, charged with, or convicted of certain crimes; and invoked the Alien Enemies Act in March 2025.

Border encounters between migrants and U.S. Customs and Border Protection (CBP) continued to decline since Trump took office in 2025; refugee admissions have also plummeted. The overall strategy of the Trump administration, and the often maximalist tactics employed, primarily by the U.S. Department of Homeland Security, have received widespread criticism, and protests have erupted across the country in response. Legal challenges have been mounted in federal courts against many of the administration's actions, in some cases leading to injunctions.

The Republican Party-dominated Congress has passed legislation supporting the expansion of immigration enforcement activities. In 2025, Congress passed and President Donald Trump signed the One Big Beautiful Bill Act which appropriated $170 billion to immigration enforcement through 2029. In 2026, Congress passed and President Trump signed the Secure America Act which appropriated, through 2029, an additional $69.5 billion dollars.

=== Domestic military actions ===
==== George Floyd protests (2020) ====
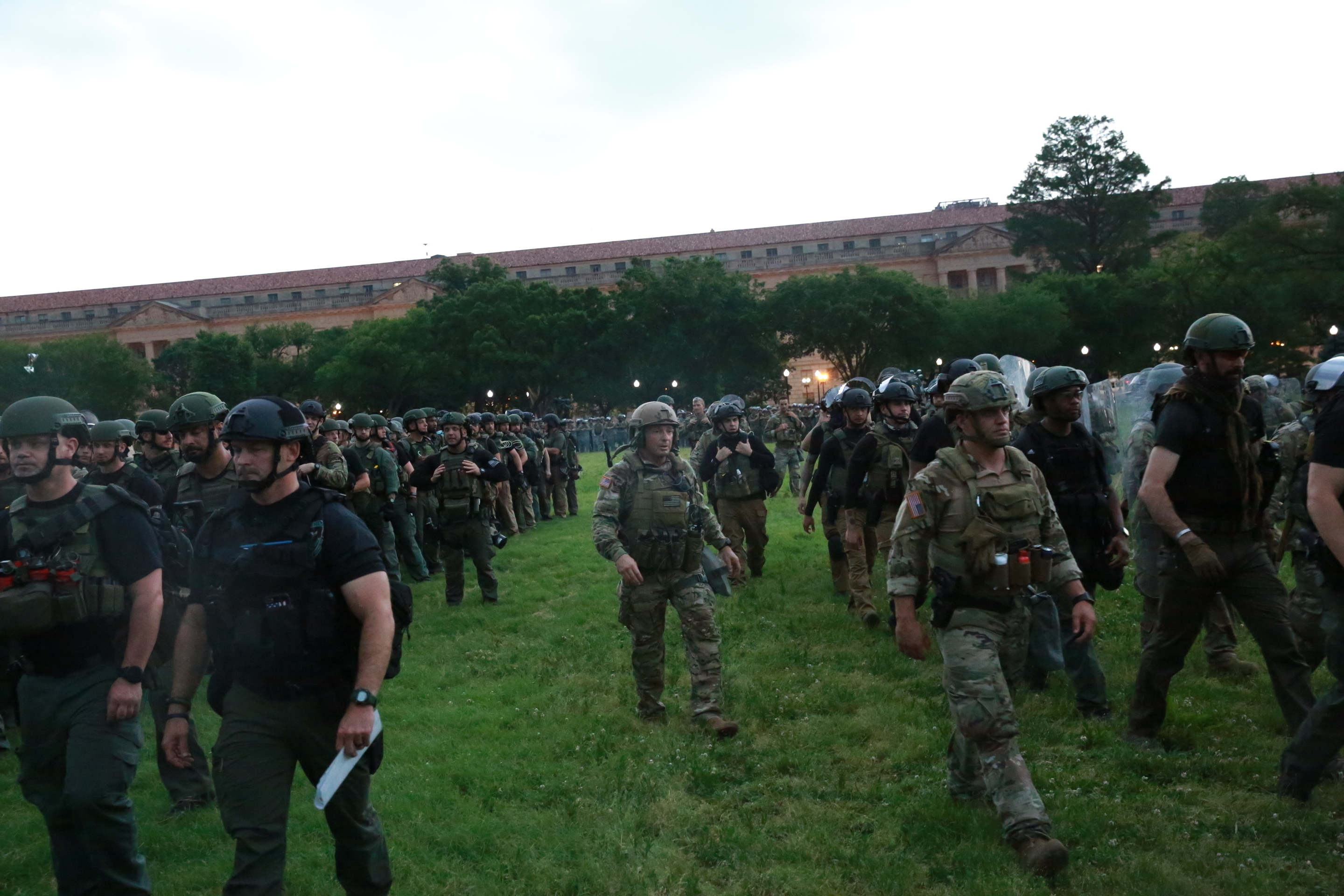
US Army National Guard soldiers assist law enforcement in Washington DC, 2026

In June 2020, the Trump administration began deploying federal law enforcement forces to some cities in the United States in response to rioting and monument removals amid the George Floyd protests. Federal law enforcement elements were deployed under Operation Legend, Operation Diligent Valor, and the Protecting American Communities Task Force (PACT). The Department of Homeland Security (DHS) cited an executive order regarding "monuments, memorials and statues" as allowing federal officers to be deployed without the permission of individual U.S. states, as the federal government "has the right to enforce federal laws, investigate crimes and make arrests" within states.

On June 1, 2020, in Washington, D.C., federal law enforcement deployed riot control tactics and munitions against protesters to expand a security perimeter, which allowed President Donald Trump to walk from the White House to St. John's Episcopal Church, Lafayette Square for a brief photo op. Days later, anonymous federal personnel in tactical and riot gear began to appear on D.C. streets; many refused to identify themselves. In July 2020, federal forces were deployed in Portland, Oregon, as part of the PACT, where their use of unmarked cars and officers in camouflage without clear identification badges generated outrage. DHS officials defended the use of unmarked vehicles and unidentified officers in camouflage; acting DHS deputy secretary Ken Cuccinelli said, "Unmarked police vehicles are so common it's barely worth discussion" and that officers wore the same uniforms and equipment each day, so demonstrators could nevertheless identify them.

Federal details were also deployed to Kansas City and Seattle. DHS had plans to send 150 agents to Chicago and President Trump had threatened future deployments to other cities "run by liberal Democrats," including Oakland, California, and New York. According to a Government Accountability Office report released in September 2020 and based on self-reported data, tactical teams from 16 federal agencies were deployed to multiple cities in May and June alone, including Los Angeles, San Diego, and San Francisco, CA; Denver, CO; Washington, DC; Miami, FL; Detroit and Port Huron, MI; St. Louis, MO; Buffalo and New York City, NY; Dallas, El Paso, Houston, and Pearland, TX; and Seattle and Tacoma, WA.

The deployment was met with lawsuits, rebukes, and concerns over constitutionality. In May 2021, Trump's successor Joe Biden revoked the executive order that allowed for federal prosecution of individuals that vandalized federal monuments.

==== Anti-ICE protests (2025) ====
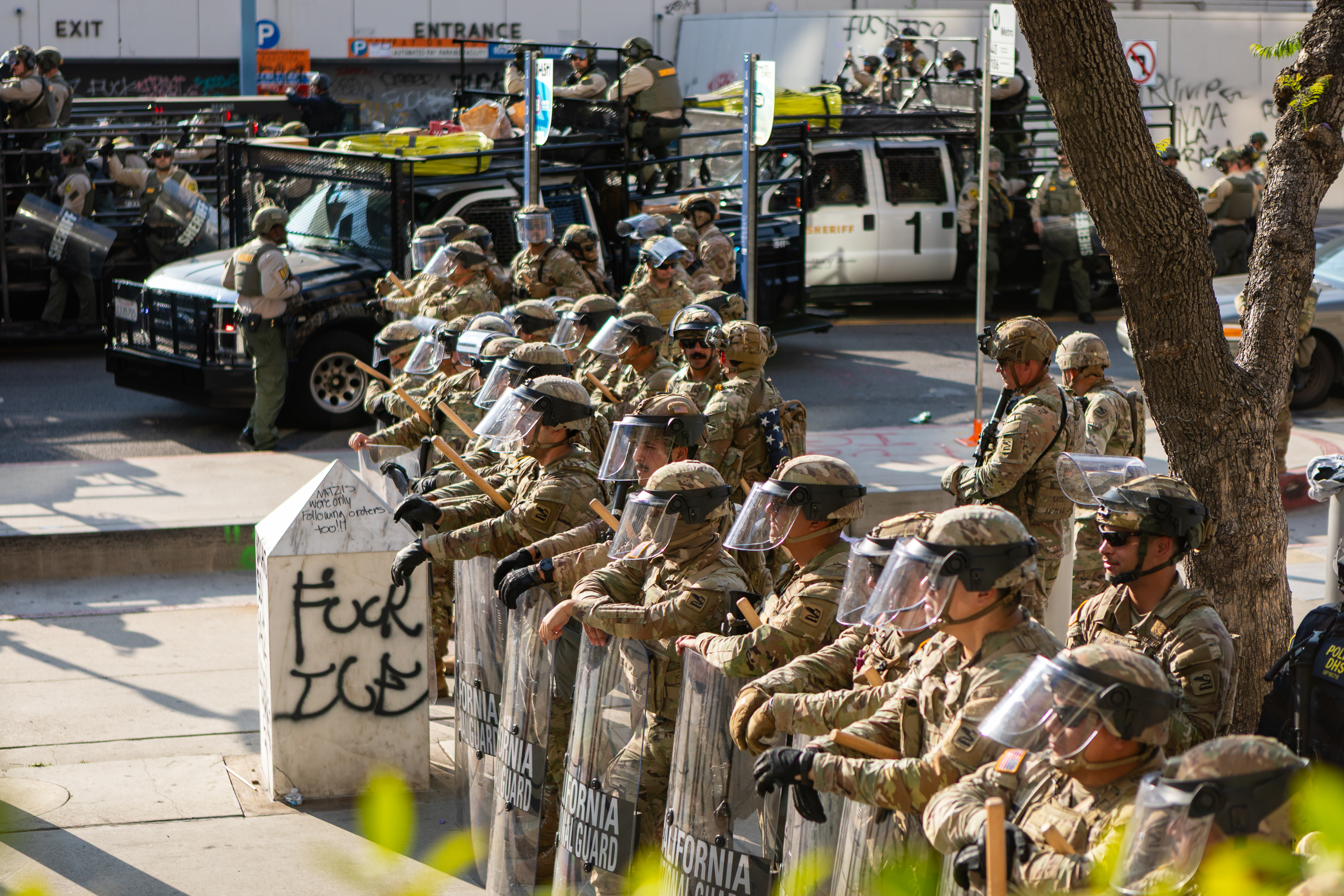
US Army National Guard soldiers at the LA anti-ICE protests, 2025

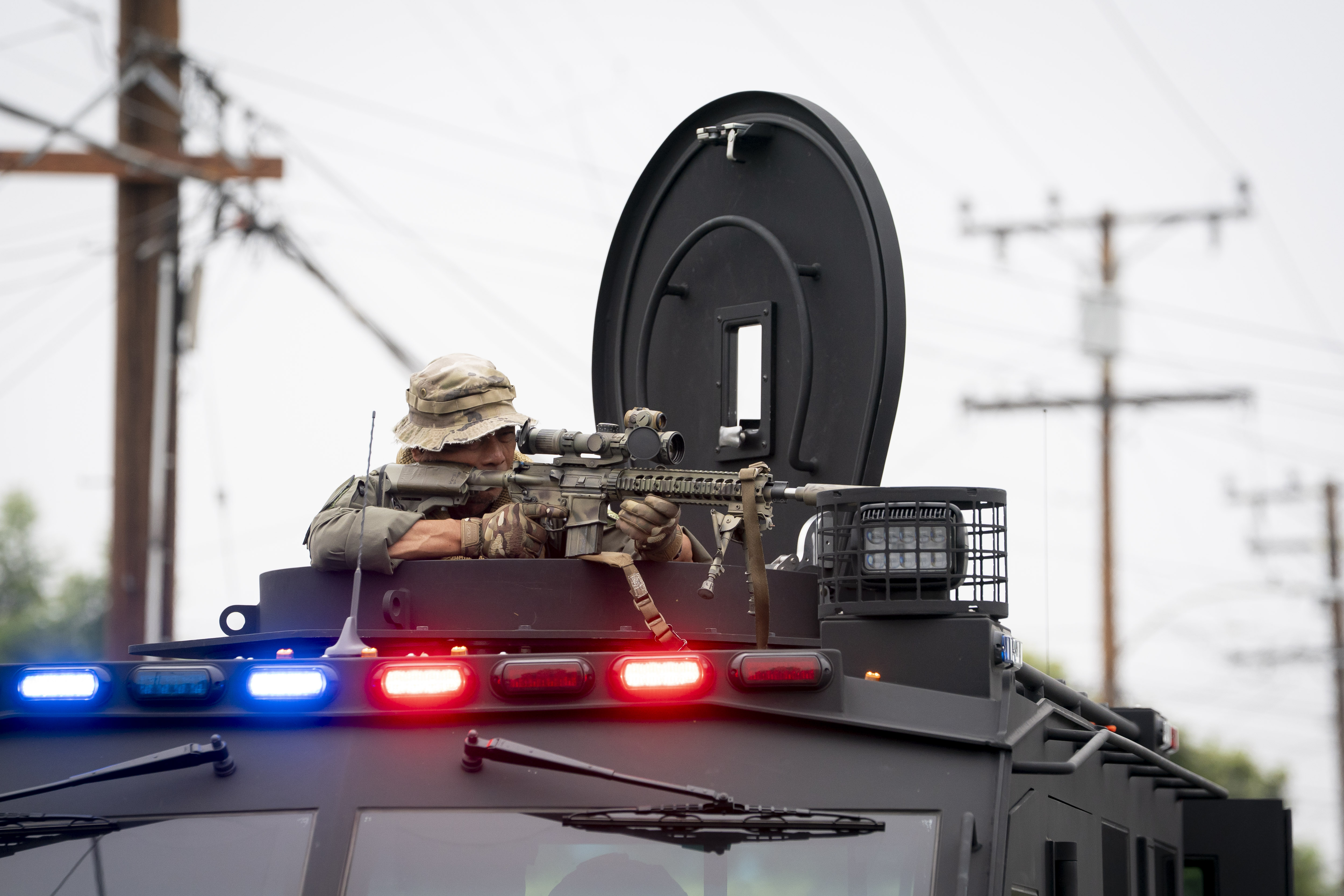
Law enforcement officer in an armored vehicle aiming an assault rifle during the 2025 June LA protests

During his second presidency, Donald Trump ordered deployments of National Guard troops to select U.S. cities in 2025 and certain deployments have continued into 2026. Trump has given multiple explanations for the deployments, saying they are officially part of crackdowns on protests, civil unrest, crime, homelessness, and illegal immigration. The actions targeted Democratic Party-led cities and sparked significant controversy, with critics labeling them as abuses of power and potential violations of laws like the Posse Comitatus Act, which limits military involvement in domestic law enforcement. The moves came amidst broader expansions of the military's domestic use during the second Trump administration, and Trump's prior comments during his presidential campaign to use the military to end civil unrest and protests without consent from state governors and target "the enemy within".

Deployments began in Los Angeles in June 2025 and expanded to Washington, D.C., in August 2025, before presidential authorizations were issued to expand to Memphis, Tennessee, and Portland, Oregon, in September 2025. Federal forces arrived in Memphis in October 2025. Plans were underway for Chicago and potentially other cities like New York, Baltimore, San Francisco, and Oakland, California. In September 2025, Trump told military leaders to view the deployments as "training grounds for our military" and described America as under "invasion" and waging "a war from within". In October 2025, Trump authorized federal troop deployments in Chicago as part of Operation Midway Blitz, a multi-agency surge aimed at "criminal illegal aliens" in Illinois and moved on to New Orleans in December.

On September 2, 2025, a federal judge ruled that the administration had illegally sent troops into Los Angeles in violation of the Posse Comitatus Act, a development described as potentially complicating Trump's threats for further military deployment. Further court cases and appeals questioned the legality of the deployments, with the U.S. Supreme Court rejecting an administration emergency appeal of a lower court ruling blocking the National Guard deployment to Chicago. On December 31, Trump announced that the administration would be ending its efforts to deploy the National Guard to Los Angeles, Portland, and Chicago, while suggesting that future National Guard deployments in those cities were still possible. In January 2026, all troops deployed to Chicago, Portland, and Los Angeles were withdrawn, while the National Guard deployment to the District of Columbia was extended to the end of the year.

In the same month, the Congressional Budget Office estimated that the deployments to Los Angeles, Memphis, Portland, Chicago, and the District of Columbia cost $496 million from June through December 2025, and would cost $93 million per month if all five deployments and the deployment in New Orleans were continued in 2026 (which would amount to $1.1 billion in total if continued for the whole year). A minority staff report issued by the Senate Homeland Security Committee in February 2026 estimated that the deployment to the District of Columbia alone from August 2025 through the end of the month would cost $332 million (or $602 million on an annualized basis), which compared with a $599 million budget for the Metropolitan Police Department for fiscal year 2026. As noted by local elected and law enforcement officials, crime statistics from before the National Guard deployments showed falling violent crime and property crime rates in Portland, Los Angeles, Chicago, Memphis, New Orleans, and the District of Columbia.

== Activism and intervention ==
=== Targeting of pro-Palestinian student organizers ===
Footage of Rümeysa Öztürk being handcuffed by six plainclothes and masked ICE agents, 2025

The detention of Mahmoud Khalil (March 8–June 20, 2025; 104 days) was the US federal government's incarceration and attempted deportation of Mahmoud Khalil, a student at Columbia University and a lead negotiator of the Gaza Solidarity Encampment during the Gaza war and genocide. On March 8, 2025, plainclothes US Immigration and Customs Enforcement (ICE) agents took Khalil—who had not been accused of, charged with, or convicted of any crime—from his Columbia residential apartment building in the Morningside Heights neighborhood of New York City. The agents did not have a warrant and were acting on orders from the State Department to revoke Khalil's student visa. When the agents were informed that Khalil is a lawful permanent resident, they said that status would be revoked instead. By March 10, ICE had transported Khalil to its LaSalle Detention Center in Jena, Louisiana, where he was held until being released on bail on June 20.

Other pro-Palestinian students and professors have been targeted for arrest and deportation since 2025, including Mohsen Mahdawi, Rümeysa Öztürk, and Leqaa Kordia.

=== Anti-ICE protests ===
==== In 2025 ====
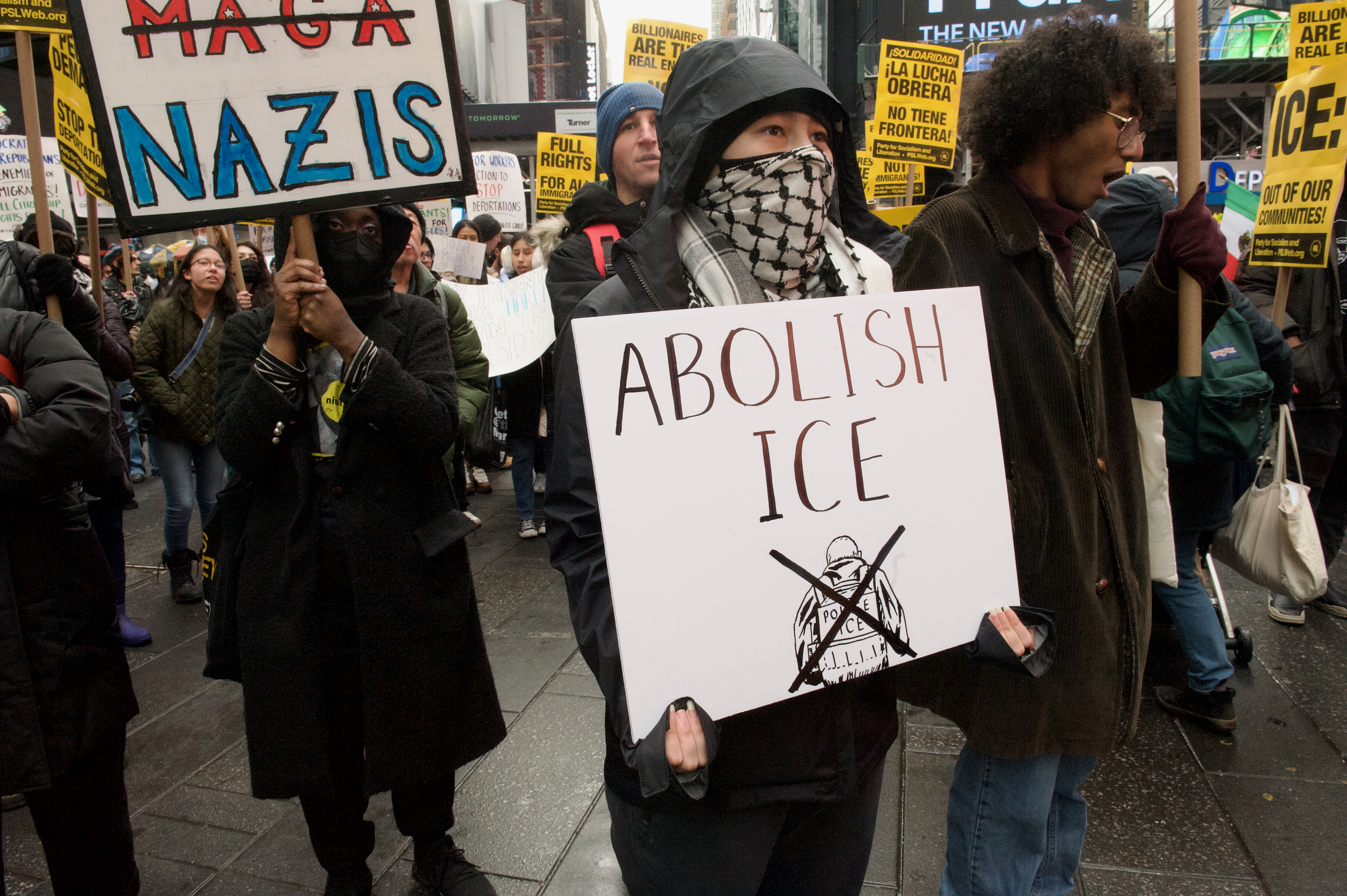
A protester holds a sign reading "Abolish ICE"

Since January 2025, several protests broke out against United States president Donald Trump's mass deportation of immigrants following his inauguration for his second presidential term on January 20, 2025. Large-scale protests have occurred throughout Trump's second term in Alabama, California, Arkansas, Georgia, Illinois, Indiana, Massachusetts, New York, North Carolina, South Carolina, Texas, Minnesota, and Washington.

Most notable were the June Los Angeles protests, which saw civil unrest (including peaceful protests and some riots), where the California National Guard was deployed and there were significant crackdowns on protesters. There was also significant controversy during the Operation Midway Blitz protests in Chicago, Illinois.

==== In 2026 ====
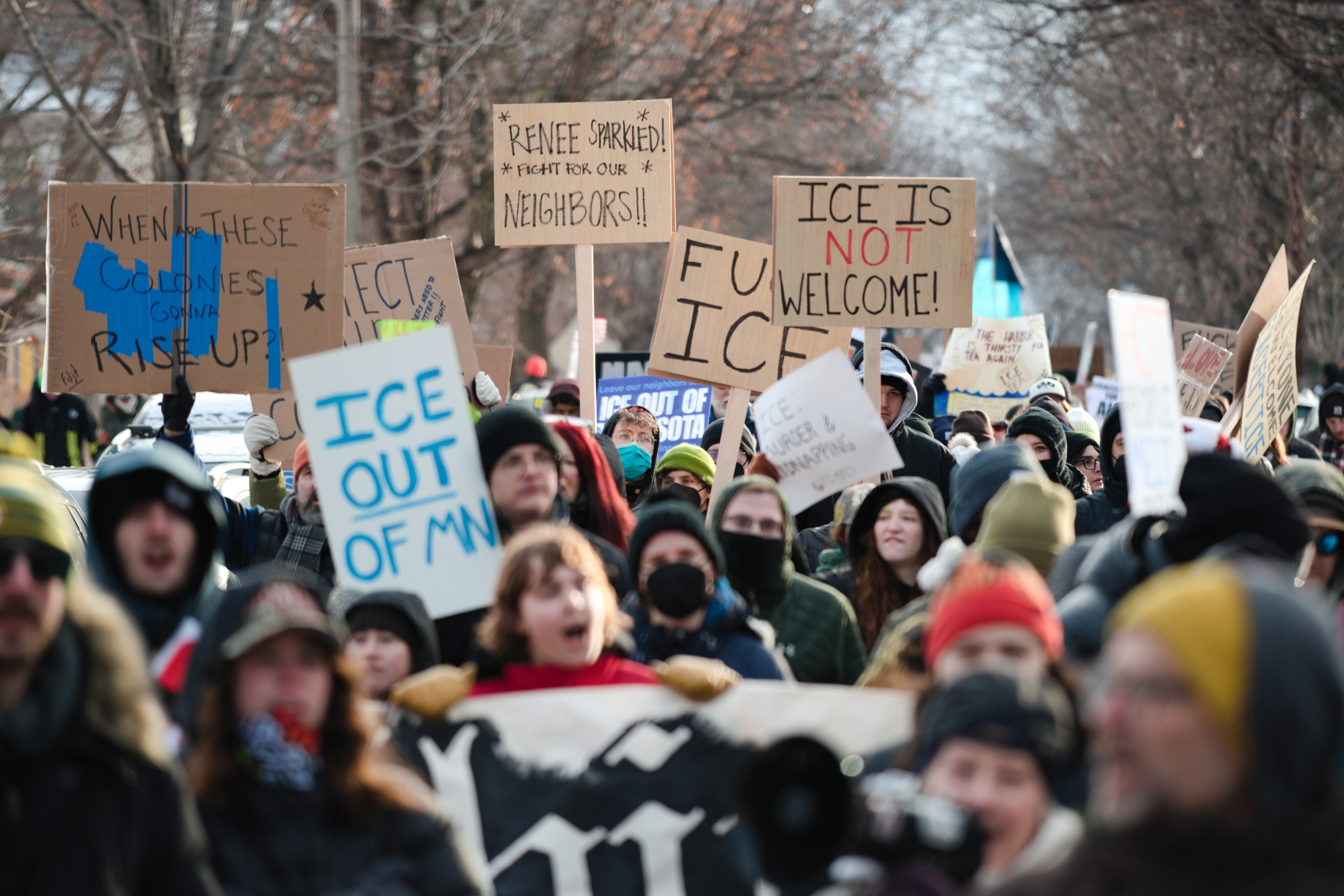
Protesters march in Minneapolis during Operation Metro Surge after the killing of Renée Good

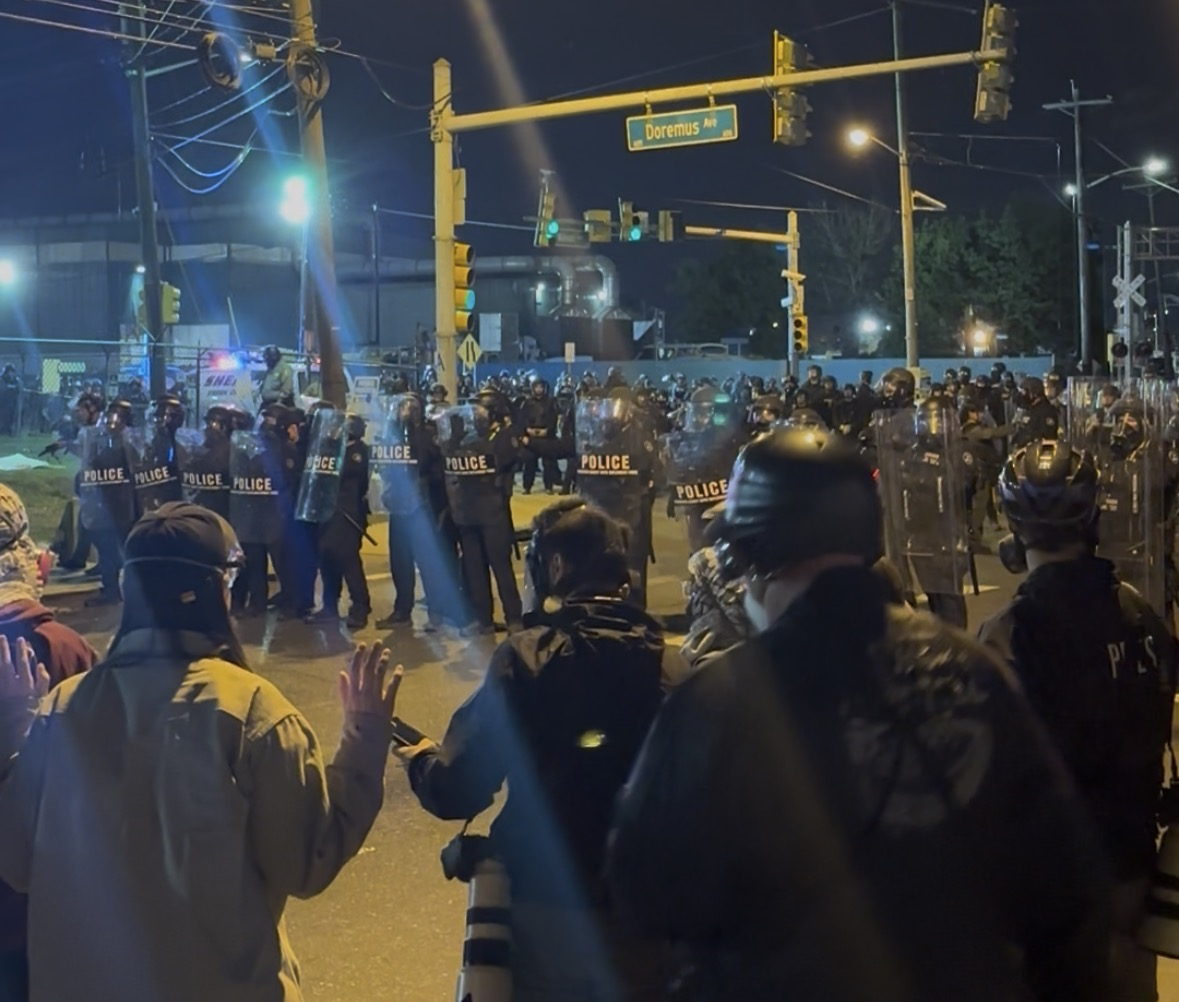
Riot police outside Delaney Hall shortly before arresting protesters and journalists

Since January 2026, widespread progressive and left-wing community- and immigrant-led protests escalated throughout the United States challenging violence by federal immigration enforcement agents (primarily ICE, with other incidents involving CBP). The protests were ignited by a series of shootings and killings by officers including the killing of activist Renée Good, the shooting of two unarmed people in Portland, and the killing of healthcare worker Alex Pretti. Protests continued throughout the year and were later fueled by the killings of Lorenzo Salgado Araujo and Johan Sebastián Durán Guerrero in July.

Most protesters engaged in peaceful demonstrations (including the largest single-day protest in American history), while other protesters have physically confronted ICE agents and police, often using black bloc tactics and obstructing ICE vehicles to impair the federal government's ability to detain and deport immigrants. Protesters have on multiple occasions slashed the tires of ICE vehicles.

There have been hundreds of arrests across the country, including at least 30 arrests in Minnesota during Operation Metro Surge, at least six during the Portland, Oregon protests, at least 74 in New York City, and at least 90 in New Jersey during the Delaney Hall hunger strike and protests. Journalists have been increasingly harmed or criminally charged during their coverage of the protests, which has received widespread condemnation from advocacy groups including the Committee to Protect Journalists and the Society of Professional Journalists, while French organization Reporters Without Borders characterized local and federal government responses to some protests as "repression typical of an authoritarian regime."

The protests are a continuation of protests from the previous year against a newly-elected Trump's aggressive immigration policy — most notably the Los Angeles protests in June and the Operation Midway Blitz protests in September.

== Other incidents and aspects ==
A month after the beginning of the presidency, the government had been sued 200 times for "executive overreach," which the administration lost for the most part. On Twitter, Trump justified his policies by quoting Napoleon: "He who saves his Country does not violate any Law." In reaction, the American Left accused him of acting as a dictator.

Experts and newspapers feared a constitutional crisis because of frequent checks and balances breaches. The Trump administration often questioned the legitimacy of judges blocking his executive orders.

According to The New Yorker, Trump's new governance based itself on unconditional loyalty towards himself. Trump allegedly implemented a climate where any criticism, even among the Republicans, is sanctioned. Figures like Jack Posobiec and Laura Loomer acted as ideological safeguards by listing potential dissidents among the party.

The administrations openly wanted to concentrate political powers within Trump's hands. They justify it with the unitary executive theory, alleging that by having been elected and with the approval of the Constitution, Trump is warranted in having unchecked and absolute power in the judicial branch, and in politics in general. Legal expert Julien Jeanneney argued that the "unconstitutional" policies of Trump are backed by the Supreme Court, of which a third of the judges had been appointed by Trump during his first presidency, hence making Republican judges the majority. According to Jeanneney, most of the judges "seem clearly on Trump's side concerning most of his policies, even when they violate the Court's long-lived principles."

Numerous experts of fascism and historians (Jason Stanley, Marci Shore, Timothy Snyder, Johann Chapoutot, Paul Lerner, Anne Berg, Diana Garvin, Tiffany Florvil, Claudia Koonz, Asma Mhalla, and Ben Worthy) denounced the authoritarianism of the presidency, which they explicitly linked to fascism. However, experts Christopher R. Browning, Roger Griffin, Janos Bourgeois, Lloyd Cox, and Brendon O'Connor contested this comparison, although Browning noted "uncanny resemblances" between Trump and Hitler, and Cox and O'Connor talked about the "proto-fascist phenomenon."

== See also ==
- Targeting of political opponents and civil society under the second Trump administration
- NSPM-7
- 2025 Prairieland ICE detention center incident

== Sources ==
- Badie, Bertrand; Berg-Schlosser, Dirk; Morlino, Leonardo (2011). "Fascism". In Badie, Bertrand; Berg-Schlosser, Dirk; Morlino, Leonardo (eds.). International Encyclopedia of Political Science. SAGE Publications. doi:10.4135/9781412994163. ISBN 9781412959636.
- Blamires, Cyprian (2006). World Fascism: A Historical Encyclopedia. Vol. 1. Santa Barbara, CA: ABC-CLIO.
- Bragman, Walker (January 5, 2026). "Experts Warn U.S. in Early Stages of Genocide Against Trans Americans". Important Context. Archived from the original on January 8, 2026.
- Copsey, Nigel (2008). Contemporary British Fascism: The British National Party and the Quest for Legitimacy (second ed.). London and New York: Routledge. ISBN 978-0-230-57437-3.
- Copsey, Nigel (2023). "Afterword: "Are you a communist? No, I am an anti-fascist."". In Pirjevec, Jože; Pelikan, Egon; Ramet, Sabrina P. (eds.). Anti-Fascism in European History: From the 1920s to Today. Central European University Press. pp. 269–280. ISBN 978-963-386-658-0.
- Davies, Peter; Lynch, Derek, eds. (2002). The Routledge Companion to Fascism and the Far Right. Routledge. ISBN 978-1-134-60952-9 – via Google Books.
- Eley, Geoff (2013). Nazism as Fascism: Violence, Ideology, and the Ground of Consent in Germany 1930–1945. London and New York: Routledge. ISBN 978-0-203-69430-5.
- "Fascism". Encyclopedia Britannica. January 8, 2008.
- Gillies, Jamie (2022). "The Authoritarian Elephant Next Door?: A Canadian and Comparative Perspective Amidst American Democratic Backsliding & Uncertainty". American Behavioral Scientist. 67 (5): 598–611. doi:10.1177/00027642221103182. S2CID 248979975.
- Goodwin, Matthew J. (2011). New British Fascism: Rise of the British National Party. London and New York: Routledge. ISBN 978-0-415-46500-7.
- Griffin, Roger (1995). Fascism. Oxford, England: Oxford University Press.
- Haltiwanger, John (September 25, 2020). "Historians and election experts warn Trump is behaving like Mussolini and despots that the US usually condemns". Business Insider. Archived from the original on October 18, 2023.
- Hartley, John (2004). Communication, Cultural and Media Studies: The Key Concepts (3rd ed.). Routledge. ISBN 978-0-521-55982-9.
- "Fascism". Holocaust Encyclopedia. United States Holocaust Memorial Museum. Archived from the original on March 28, 2025.
- Jardina, Ashley; Mickey, Robert (2022). "White Racial Solidarity and Opposition to American Democracy". The Annals of the American Academy of Political and Social Science. 699 (1): 79–89. doi:10.1177/00027162211069730. S2CID 247499954.
- Kallis, Aristotle, ed. (2003b). The Fascism Reader. London: Routledge.
- Kaufman, Robert R.; Haggard, Stephan (2019). "Democratic Decline in the United States: What Can We Learn from Middle-Income Backsliding?". Perspectives on Politics. 17 (2): 417–432. doi:10.1017/S1537592718003377. S2CID 149457724.
- Larsen, Stein Ugelvik; Hagtvet, Bernt; Myklebust, Jan Petter, eds. (1984). Who Were the Fascists: Social Roots of European Fascism. Columbia University Press. ISBN 978-82-00-05331-6.
- Levitsky, Steven; Way, Lucan A. (2010). Competitive Authoritarianism: Hybrid Regimes after the Cold War. Problems of International Politics. Cambridge University Press. ISBN 978-0521882521.
- López, Matias; Luna, Juan Pablo (2021). "Assessing the Risk of Democratic Reversal in the United States: A Reply to Kurt Weyland". PS: Political Science & Politics. 54 (3): 421–426. doi:10.1017/S1049096521000329. ISSN 1049-0965. S2CID 235612952.
- "Fascism". Merriam-Webster Online. Archived from the original on August 22, 2017.
- Müller, Jan-Werner (October 29, 2024). "No, Trump is not a fascist. But that doesn't make him any less dangerous". The Guardian. ISSN 0261-3077. Archived from the original on March 31, 2025.
- Nolte, Ernst (1965). The Three Faces of Fascism: Action Française, Italian Fascism, National Socialism. Translated by Vennewitz, Leila. London: Weidenfeld & Nicolson.
- Payne, Stanley G. (1975). "Spanish Fascism in Comparative Perspective". In Turner, Henry Ashby (ed.). Reappraisals of Fascism. New Viewpoints. pp. 142–169. ISBN 978-0531053720.
- ——— (1992). "Fascism". In Hawkesworth, Mary; Kogan, Maurice (eds.). Encyclopaedia of Government and Politics. Vol. 1. Routledge. pp. 167–178. ISBN 978-0-203-71288-7.
- Paxton, Robert O. (2004). The Anatomy of Fascism (First ed.). New York: Alfred A. Knopf. ISBN 978-1-4000-4094-0.
- Reich, Wilhelm (1970). The Mass Psychology of Fascism. HarperCollins. ISBN 978-0-285-64701-5.
- Richardson, John E. (2017). British Fascism: A Discourse-Historical Analysis. Stuttgart: Ibidem Press. ISBN 978-3-8382-6491-2.
- Rowland, Robert C. (2021). The Rhetoric of Donald Trump: Nationalist Populism and American Democracy. University Press of Kansas. ISBN 978-0-7006-3196-4.
- Staudenmaier, Peter (2004). "Fascism". In Krech III, Shepard; McNeill, John; Merchant, Carolyn (eds.). Encyclopedia of World Environmental History. Routledge. pp. 517–521. ISBN 0-415-93733-7.
- Weyland, Kurt (2020). "Populism's Threat to Democracy: Comparative Lessons for the United States". Perspectives on Politics. 18 (2): 389–406. doi:10.1017/S1537592719003955. S2CID 213708401.
- Wistrich, Robert (October 1976). "Leon Trotsky's Theory of Fascism". Journal of Contemporary History. 11 (4). Thousand Oaks, California: SAGE Publishing: 157–184. doi:10.1177/002200947601100409. JSTOR 260195. S2CID 140420352.
- Woodley, Daniel (2010). Fascism and Political Theory: Critical Perspectives on Fascist Ideology. London and New York: Routledge. ISBN 978-0-415-47354-5.
