= Authority (disambiguation) =

Authority is the power to command.

Authority or The Authority may also refer to:

== Arts, entertainment, and media ==
- Authority (album), a 2014 album by British electronic music group Client
- "Authority" (Law & Order: Special Victims Unit), a ninth-season episode of Law & Order: Special Victims Unit
- Authority (novel), a 2014 book by Jeff VanderMeer, the second book in the Southern Reach trilogy
- Authority (essay collection), a 2025 book of literary criticism by Andrea Long Chu
- The Authority (comics), superhero comic book published by DC Comics, under the Wildstorm imprint, debuting in 1999
- The Authority (His Dark Materials), His Dark Materials character who debuts in the 2000 novel The Amber Spyglass
- "The Authority" (The Amazing World of Gumball), a second-season episode of The Amazing World of Gumball
- The Authority, used by the autonomous council of vampire hierarchs in The Southern Vampire Mysteries novels and the TV series True Blood based on the novels

== Internet ==
- Authority, a grading of a blog's worthiness, used by Technorati
- Authority, one of two scores assigned by the HITS algorithm, a scheme used for ranking web pages (also known as hubs and authorities)

== Law ==
- Legal authority, a right or permission to do something
  - Legal authority to arrest someone, known as the power of arrest
- Authority, one of the sources of law in a particular legal system
  - Primary authority
  - Secondary authority
- Authority in the law of agency, the ability of an agent to legally bind a principal
  - Apparent authority
  - Actual authority
- Rational-legal authority, a sociological concept

== Organizations ==
- High Authority (disambiguation), any of several executive organizations or branches
- Palestinian National Authority, the administrative organization established to govern the West Bank and Gaza Strip as a consequence of the 1994 Oslo Accords
- Police authority (UK), a body charged with securing efficient and effective control of a territorial police area
- Public authority, a government-chartered corporation such as a transit authority
- The Authority (professional wrestling), a faction in WWE created by Triple H and Stephanie McMahon

== Other uses ==
- Authority (management), formal or legitimate, specified in a charter
- Authority (sociology), the legitimate or socially approved use of power
- Authority (textual criticism), a text's reliability as a witness to the author's intentions
- Appeal to authority, a type of argument in logic
- Authority control, in library and information science, standardization of the names of entities
- Taxonomic authority, the scientist who first validly published a taxon name

== See also ==
- Authoritarian personality, influential theory, developed in a 1950 book, by several UC Berkeley psychologists
- Authoritarianism, describes a form of government characterized by an emphasis on the authority of the state in a republic or union
