= Bertrand Badie =

French political scientist and international relations specialist

Bertrand Badie (born 1950) is a Franco-Persian political scientist and international relations specialist, emeritus professor at Sciences Po. He is one of the most renowned French specialists in international relations.

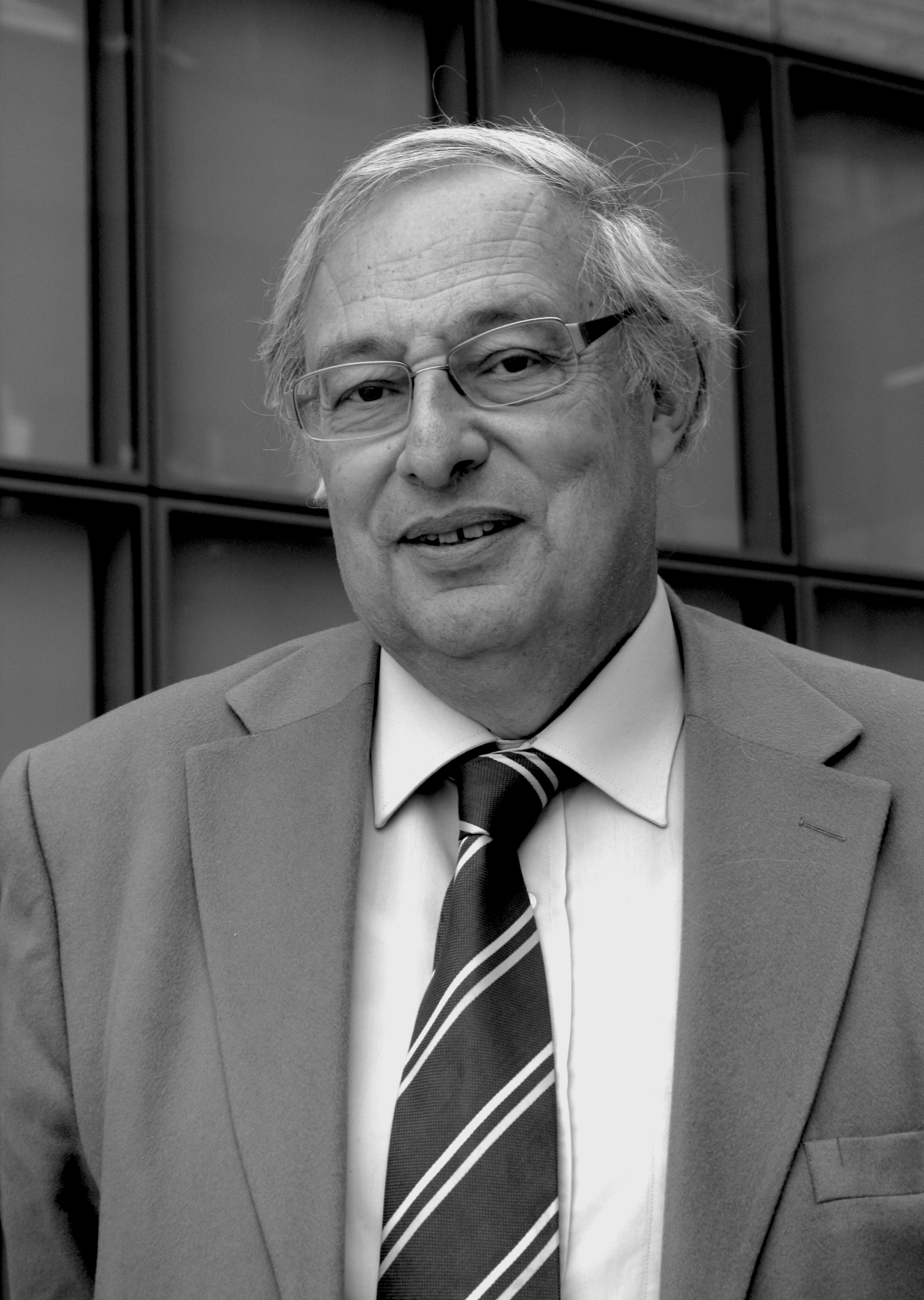
Badie in 2012

== Bibliography ==
- Bertrand Badie, The sociology of the State, University of Chicago Press, 1983, ISBN 9780226035499
- Bertrand Badie, The imported State, Stanford University Press, 2000
- Bertrand Badie, Diplomacy of Connivance, Palgrave Macmillan US, 2012, ISBN 978-1-137-00642-4
- Bertrand Badie, Humiliation in International Relations, Bloomsbury, 2017
- Bertrand Badie, New perspectives on the international order, Palgrave, 2019
- Bertrand Badie, Rethinking International relations, Elgar, 2020
- Bertrand Badie, co-editor of The International Encyclopedia of Political Science (with Berg-Schlosser and Morlino), Sage, 2011 and Handbook of Political Science, Sage, 2020
- Bertrand Badie, A Subjective Approach to International relations, Polity Press, 2025.
