= Detention of Leqaa Kordia =

Palestinian immigrant detained in US

- Part of the Visa and deportation controversies in the second Trump administration
- Date: March 13, 2025
- Location: Newark, New Jersey, U.S.
- Cause: Pro-Palestinian activism at Columbia University
- Participants: U.S. Immigration and Customs Enforcement
- Arrests: Leqaa Kordia

Leqaa Kordia (Arabic: لقاء كردية) is a Palestinian woman from East Jerusalem who was detained by the U.S. Immigration and Customs Enforcement (ICE) on March 13, 2025, at an immigration office in Newark, New Jersey. The government cited her overstaying an F-1 student visa, which had expired on January 26, 2022, after she left her academic program. Kordia had previously been arrested at Columbia University during a pro-Palestinian demonstration, though those charges were later dropped.

Following her detention, Kordia was transferred to the Prairieland ICE Detention Center in Alvarado, Texas. Government attorneys alleged she had provided material support to Hamas based on money transfers to family members in Gaza. An immigration judge rejected that claim in April 2025, finding no evidence of any connection to a terrorist organization. Despite two court orders for her release on bond, Kordia remained in ICE custody while the government appealed the orders while pursuing removal proceedings. Her continued detention was enabled by the government filing automatic stays, which allow the government to keep a person detained during an appeal.

Kordia's case drew increasing public attention throughout 2025, with politicians, human rights organizations, and legal advocates calling for her release. By January 2026, she had become the last Columbia protester remaining in immigration detention. On March 16, 2026, she was released from detention after the government did not appeal a third court order for her release.

== Biography ==
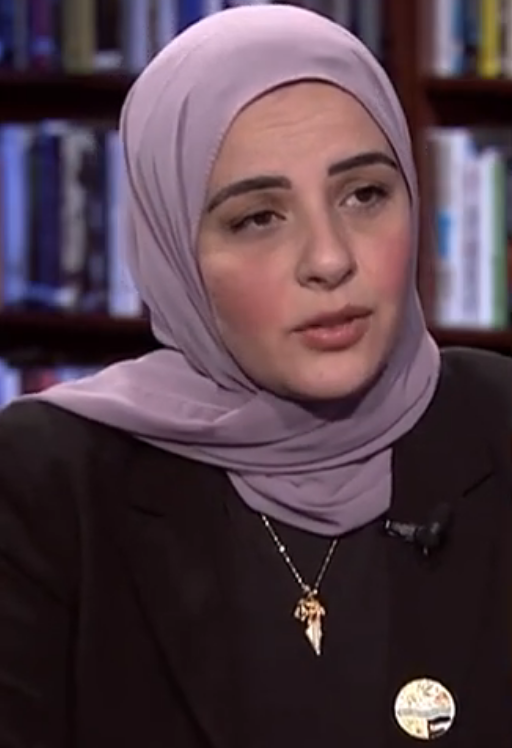
Kordia interviewed by Democracy Now! in April 2026

Leqaa Kordia was born in East Jerusalem. Her parents separated when she was young. Her mother lived in Gaza for a few years, and Kordia would travel back and forth from the strip to her father in Ramallah. Eventually, Kordia's mother moved to the United States and remarried, becoming a U.S. citizen. Kordia and her brother remained with her father in the West Bank. When she was nine years old, during the second intifada, an Israeli soldier raided her house and pointed a rifle at her in her bedroom.

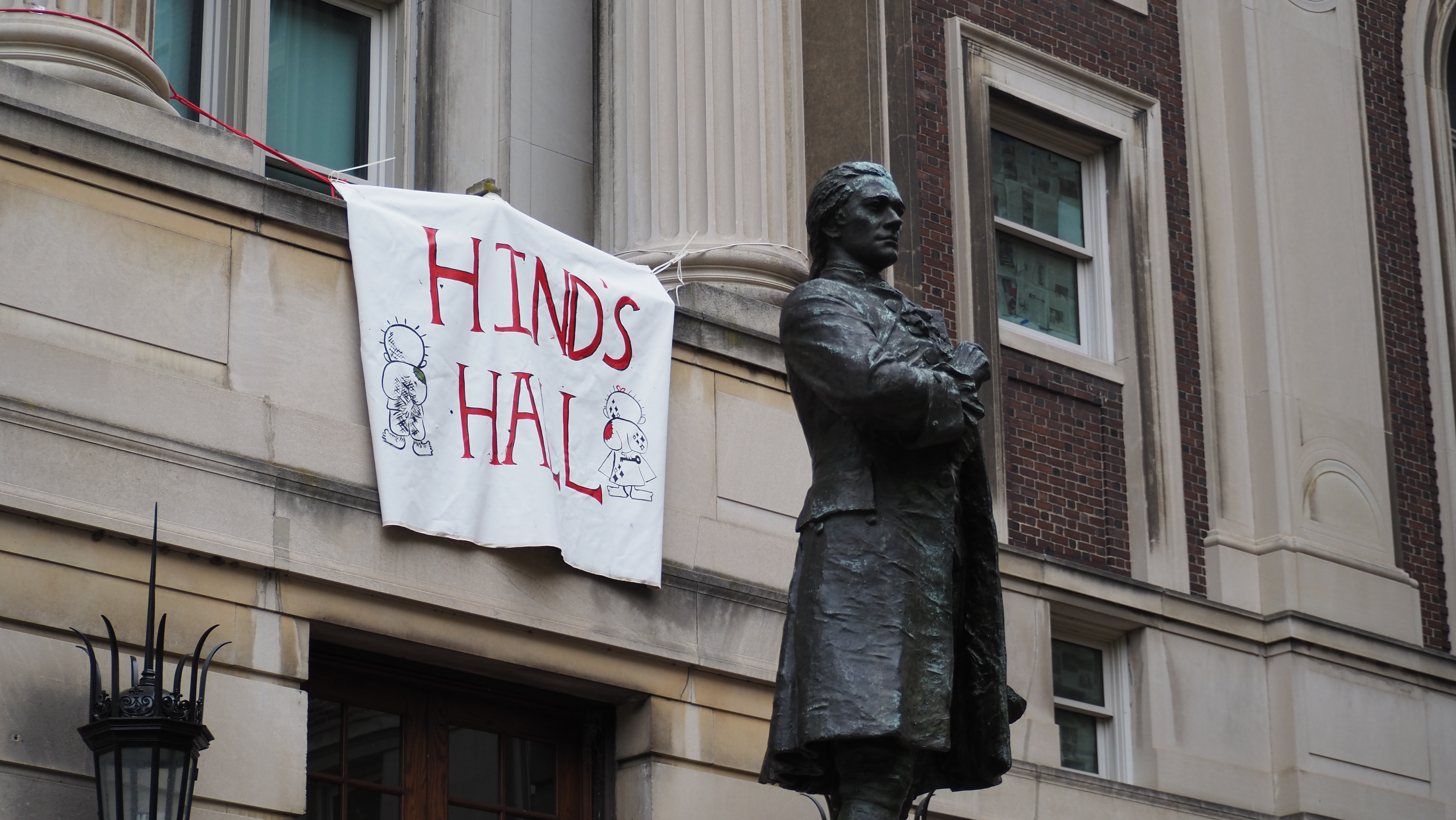
A banner hangs from Columbia's Hamilton Hall after protesters occupied the building on April 30, 2024, renaming it "Hind's Hall." Later that day, Kordia was arrested alongside 100 other pro-Palestine protesters outside the gates of Columbia University. The charge of failure to disperse was subsequently dismissed.

Kordia came to the U.S. in 2016 on a visitor visa and subsequently enrolled in English-language programs, first at Uceda Paterson and later at Bergen County Career Advancement Training, on an F-1 student visa. In 2022, after her mother filed a family-based petition for Kordia to start the process of obtaining permanent residency, she dropped out of school. She then cared for her mother and autistic half-brother in Paterson, New Jersey, working as a waitress. Since October 7, 2023, Kordia has lost over 200 relatives in the Gaza war and genocide, according to her attorney. Kordia attended several protests in support of Palestine. On April 30, 2024, she was arrested alongside 100 other protesters at Columbia University, but the charges were later dropped.

== Arrest by ICE agents and detention ==
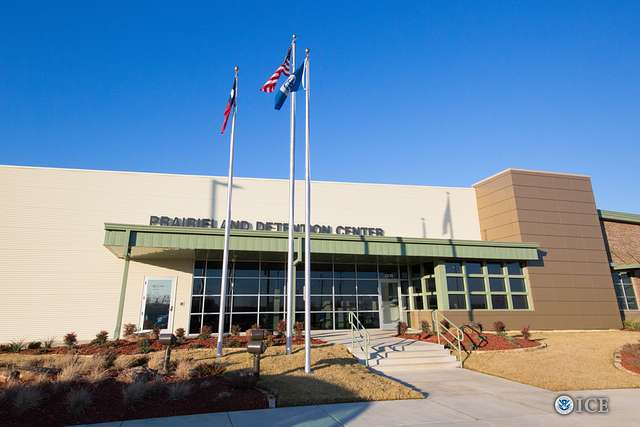
The Prairieland ICE detention center where Kordia is detained.

Kordia arrived at the ICE field office in Newark, New Jersey for what she believed was a simple interview on March 13, 2025. At the immigration hearing, she was detained and placed in an unmarked van, ultimately arriving at the Prairieland Immigration and Customs Enforcement (ICE) Detention Center in Alvarado, Texas. While detained at the center, she wrote an Op-ed for USA Today entitled "10 months later, I'm the last Columbia protester still in ICE custody" on January 21, 2026. She also had an English language book by the Palestinian poet Refaat Alareer, who was killed in a 2023 Israeli airstrike, while in detention, which she said she shared with other detainees.

Government attorneys alleged that Kordia was a Hamas supporter based on her transfer of money to support family members in the Middle East, in Gaza and elsewhere, since 2017. The Department of Homeland Security (DHS) subpoenaed Kordia's records from Western Union and MoneyGram, which showed she had transferred funds to relatives in Gaza.

On February 6, 2026, Kordia was hospitalized at Texas Health Huguley Hospital in Burleson, Texas following a seizure. She was discharged back into ICE custody on February 9, 2026. According to her attorney, Sarah Sherman-Stokes, ICE did not inform Kordia's family of the location where she received medical treatment, citing "a safety issue." In a statement to the Guardian, a spokesperson for the Department of Homeland Security dismissed Kordia’s claims about medical neglect. Kordia wrote that, during her hospitalization, she was chained to a bed for 72 hours.

== Legal proceedings ==
Kordia vs. Noem
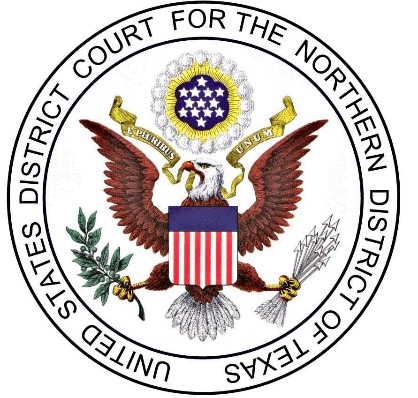
- Court: United States District Court for the Northern District of Texas
- Docket nos.: 3:25-cv-01072

Court membership
- Judges sitting: Sam A. Lindsay, Rebecca Rutherford

On April 16, 2025, immigration judge Tara Naselow-Nahas filed a court order for Kordia's release on a $20,000 bond, stating "There is no evidence in the record that this person supports Hamas or is a member of a terrorist organization. In the absence of evidence of any connection to terrorist organizations, the Court cannot find that Respondent is supporting a terrorist organization by sending money to a family member in Palestine." Despite this order, Kordia remained in ICE custody after the Trump administration ordered an automatic stay. According to Kordia, "ICE appealed the same day, saying that I'm dangerous, I went for a protest and all that."

On April 30, 2025, Kordia's legal team filed a habeas corpus petition against DHS secretary Kristi Noem, US Attorney General Pam Bondi, and acting ICE director Todd Lyons. They described her detention as a violation of her civil liberties, and detailed the allegations of violations to Kordia's religious freedom while in custody. Her representatives from the Texas Civil Rights Project alleged her detention was a constitutional violation of the first amendment and fifth amendment for free speech and due process.

In March 2025, the New York Police Department (NYPD) provided federal immigration agencies with legal information regarding Kordia. The four page report, provided to Homeland Security Investigations, included a summary of Kordia's April 2024 arrest as well as her date of birth and home address. On May 6, 2025, NYPD launched a probe into whether the department had violated policy by sharing Kordia's records with the federal agency.

On November 3, 2025, the Department of Justice ordered Kordia removed, but granted withholding of removal. Kordia remains in detention pending the government's attempts to remove her to a third country.

In March 2026, her attorney filed a petition for her release citing health concerns. On the one-year anniversary of her detention, Texas judge Tara Naselow-Nahas ordered her release on bond, which she set at $100,000. This marked the third time that a judge ordered Kordia's release. She was released on March 16 after the government did not appeal the third order to release Kordia.

== Reactions ==
Initially, Kordia's case attracted little public attention despite her continued detention while other Gaza protesters arrested alongside her were released. Her profile rose in late 2025 when The New Yorker profiled her as "The Last Columbia Protester in ICE Detention."

=== Individuals and organizations ===
Kordia's detention was criticized by groups such as the Center for Constitutional Rights, Defending Rights & Dissent, Fight for the Future, National Lawyers Guild, and Project South. Amnesty International USA launched a campaign calling for her release in October 2025. Her arrest and detention was also criticized by Mahmoud Khalil. New York City First Lady Rama Duwaji created and shared original artwork supporting Kordia's release from detention.

During Kordia's detention, demonstrations demanding her release were held in Dallas, Texas and at Columbia University. Activists at Columbia University also held a hunger strike in March 2026 in soldarity with Kordia.

=== Ethnic and religion-based organizations ===
==== Arab and Muslim Americans ====
The Arab-American Anti-Discrimination Committee and Council on American–Islamic Relations criticized Kordia's arrest.

==== Jewish Americans ====
The Jewish Telegraphic Agency identified the protests that Kordia participated in as "anti-Israel protests that drew allegations of antisemitism." Jewish groups that expressed disapproval of Kordia's detention included Bend the Arc, IfNotNow, and Jewish Voice For Peace.

=== Elected officials ===
U.S. Senators Cory Booker, Andy Kim and Chris Van Hollen along with congresspeople Rashida Tlaib and Nellie Pou, were among the politicians who publicly called for her release. In January 2026, ICE denied Texas State Representative Salman Bhojani a scheduled visit with Kordia. In February 2026, New York City mayor Zohran Mamdani presented her case directly to President Donald Trump and White House Chief of Staff Susie Wiles, handing over a list of Kordia and three other detained activists and requesting that their cases be dismissed. While Columbia student Ellie Aghayeva was released following that meeting, Kordia remained in ICE custody.

== See also ==
- Detention of Mahmoud Khalil – 2025 arrest of Palestinian student in U.S
- Visa and deportation controversies in the second Trump administration – Use of immigration procedures to target political dissidents residing in the US
- Deportation of Kilmar Ábrego García – 2025 US extrajudicial deportation
- Deportation of Rasha Alawieh – Lebanese nephrologist deported by US CBP
- Detention of Mohsen Mahdawi – 2025 arrest of Palestinian student in U.S.
- Detention of Rümeysa Öztürk – 2025 arrest in Massachusetts
- Immigration policy of the second Donald Trump administration
- Michel Shehadeh – Arrested in 1987 under the Immigration and Nationality Act of 1952 on the basis of alleged support for the Popular Front for the Liberation of Palestine, with charges dismissed two decades later.
- Reactions to the 2024 pro-Palestinian protests on university campuses
