= High Authority =

High Authority may refer to:

- High Authority of the European Coal and Steel Community, the original executive body of the former European Coal and Steel Community.
- High authority for the struggle against discrimination and for equality, a French anti-discrimination body.
