= Dirk Berg-Schlosser =

German political scientist (born 1943)

Dirk Berg-Schlosser (born 10 December 1943 in Ruhlsdorf) is professor emeritus of political science at Marburg University in Germany.

Berg-Schlosser has studied economics, sociology and political science at LMU Munich, SciencesPo Paris, and the Free University of Berlin. He graduated from LMU Munich with a degree of Dipl.oec. publ. in 1968, equivalent to a master's degree. From 1968 to 1970, he did graduate work at the University of California, Berkeley. In 1971, he received a doctorate in political science from LMU Munich. This was followed by field work in Kenya from 1973 to 1975. In 1979, he completed his Ph.D. in political science at UC Berkeley and received his “Habilitation” (Dr. phil. habil.) from the University of Augsburg in Germany. He has conducted major research projects funded by Deutsche Forschungsgemeinschaft, Volkswagen-Foundation, Nuffield Foundation, Daimler Chrysler Foundation.

== Research ==
Berg-Schlosser's major research interests include the study of political culture, democratization, development studies, and comparative methodology. He has held professorships and visiting professorships at the Universities of Munich, Augsburg, Eichstätt, Charles University Prague, Sciences Po Lille and Sciences Po Paris, Stellenbosch/South Africa and UC Berkeley. In addition, he has given courses on comparative methodology at the Universities of Essex, Ljubljana, São Paulo, Stellenbosch, Singapore, METU Ankara, the Higher School of Economics Moscow and St. Petersburg, the Institute of Higher Studies at Vienna, and FLACSO Mexico City. He is currently a fellow of the Stellenbosch Institute of Advanced Studies (STIAS).

== Career ==
Berg-Schlosser has been member of the executive committee of the German Political Science Association (DVPW), 1980–1986, 2003–2009; the executive committee of the “European Consortium for Political Research” (ECPR), 2000–2006 and its Chair 2003-2006; the executive committee of the International Political Science Association (IPSA) 2003–2009, 2006–2009 as vice-president and chair of the Committee on Research and Training (CRT). He was IPSA summer school coordinator (2009–2016) and responsible for the summer schools at São Paulo, Stellenbosch, Singapore, Ankara, Mexico City, St. Petersburg.

He is member of the Editorial Boards of International Journal of Comparative Sociology, International Political Science Review 2003–2012, International Political Science Abstracts, Zeitschrift für Vergleichende Politikwissenschaft, European Political Science Review, Taiwan Journal of Democracy; Co-editor of the ECPR book series on Comparative Politics for Oxford University Press, 2009 - 2012); member of the Prize Committee of the Johan Skytte Prize in Political Science, 2009–2016.

He has been appointed as European Research Council (ERC) referee 2009–2013, and has served as referee for Deutsche Forschungsgemeinschaft, Leibniz-Gemeinschaft, Volkswagen Foundation, Swedish Rijksbank, Swiss National Fund, Austrian Science Foundation, International Science Foundation; National Research Foundation/South Africa, Fonds de la Recherche Scientifique (fnrs), Czech Science Foundation.

== Major publications ==
- SAGE Handbook of Political Science (ed. with Bertrand Badie and Leonardo Morlino), 3 vol., SAGE, London, 2020.
- Political Science – A Global Perspective (with Bertrand Badie and Leonardo Morlino), SAGE, London, 2017.
- Mixed Methods in Comparative Politics, Palgrave, 2012.
- International Encyclopedia of Political Science (ed. with Bertrand Badie and Leonardo Morlino), 8 vol., SAGE, Los Angeles, 2011.
- Aktuelle Methoden der Vergleichenden Politikwissenschaft (with Lasse Cronqvist), Barbara Budrich Publishers, Opladen, 2011.
- Democratization – The State of the Art (ed.), Barbara Budrich Publishers, Opladen & Farmington Hills, 2nd ed., 2007.
- Poverty and Democracy (with Norbert Kersting), ZED Books, London, 2003.
- Vergleichende Politikwissenschaft, Leske-Verlag, Opladen (co-author and co-editor with Ferdinand Müller-Rommel), 4th ed., 2003.
- Authoritarianism and Democracy in Europe 1919-39. Comparative Analyses (co-author and co-editor with Jeremy Mitchell), Palgrave, London, 2002.
- Perspectives of Democratic Consolidation in Eastern Europe (ed. with Raivo Vetik), Columbia University Press, New York, 2001.
- Einführung in die Politikwissenschaft, Verlag C.H. Beck, Munich, 7th. edition 2003, (with Theo Stammen); Czech edition: Prague, 2000.
- Conditions of Democracy in Europe, 1919-1939 - Systematic Case Studies (Co-author and co-editor: Jeremy Mitchell), Macmillan, London, 2000.
- Perspektiven der Demokratie - Probleme und Chancen im Zeitalter der Globalisierung (ed. with Hans-Joachim Giegel), Campus Verlag, Frankfurt a.M., 1999.
- Empirische Demokratieforschung - Exemplarische Analysen, Campus Verlag, Frankfurt a.M., 1999.
- Political Culture in Germany, (co-author and co-editor with Ralf Rytlewski), Macmillan Press, London, 1993.
- Political Stability and Development: A Comparative Analysis of Kenya, Tanzania and Uganda (with Rainer Siegler), Lynne Rienner Publishers, Boulder/Col., 1990.
- Politische Kultur in Deutschland - Bilanz und Perspektiven der Forschung, PVS-Sonderheft 18, Opladen, 1987 (co-author and co-editor with Jakob Schissler).
- Tradition and Change in Kenya - A Comparative Analysis of seven Major Ethnic Groups, Verlag F. Schöningh, Paderborn, 1984.
- Politische Kultur - eine neue Dimension politikwissenschaftlicher Analyse, Ernst-Vögel-Verlag, Munich, 1972.

Numerous articles in major journals and contributions to collective volumes.
