= Voting Rights Act (disambiguation) =

The Voting Rights Act most commonly refers to the Voting Rights Act of 1965, a landmark United States federal law. The term may also refer to:

- John Lewis Voting Rights Act
- State Voting Rights Act
  - California Voting Rights Act
  - John R. Lewis Voting Rights Act of Connecticut
  - John R. Lewis Voting Rights Act of New York
  - Voting Rights Act of Virginia
  - Washington Voting Rights Act
