= John R. Lewis Voting Rights Act of Connecticut =

Law enacted in Connecticut

Connecticut State Legislature
- Full name: John R. Lewis Voting Rights Act of Connecticut
- Acronym: CTVRA
- Signed into law: June 12, 2023
- Governor: Ned Lamont

Status: Current legislation

The John R. Lewis Voting Rights Act of Connecticut (CTVRA) is a Connecticut state statute and State Voting Rights Act (SVRA) designed to protect voting rights. It is modeled after the federal Voting Rights Act of 1965 and is named for civil rights movement activist and congressman John Lewis. It codifies many of the requirements of the federal act into state law and contains provisions designed to prevent discrimination. This includes preclearance provisions, the federal version of which is currently inoperable following the Supreme Court's decision in Shelby County v. Holder.

== Legislative history ==
The CTVRA was passed as part (§§ 410–418) of Connecticut's biennium 2023 budget bill (Public Act 23-204). It was signed into law by Governor Ned Lamont on June 12, 2023.

== Key provisions ==
=== Language assistance ===
The CTVRA requires certain municipalities to provide language assistance for voting. It codifies into state law requirements of the federal Voting Rights Act, but also goes beyond it. According to the Office of the Secretary of the State of Connecticut a municipality is subject to these requirements if they meet any of the following criteria.

1. More than 2% of the municipality's voting-age citizens speak a particular shared language other than English and are limited English proficient individuals.
2. More than 4,000 of the municipality's voting-age citizens speak a particular shared language other than English and are limited English proficient individuals.
3. In the case of a municipality that contains any part of a Native American reservation, more than 2% of the reservation's Native American voting-age citizens speak a particular shared language other than English and are limited English proficient individuals.

Under these criteria there are 22 municipalities in Connecticut subject to the language assistance requirements of the CTVRA.

== See also ==
- Voting Rights Act of 1965
- California Voting Rights Act
- John R. Lewis Voting Rights Act of New York
- Voting Rights Act of Virginia
- Washington Voting Rights Act
