= John R. Lewis Voting Rights Act of New York =

New York state law

New York State Legislature
- Acronym: NYVRA
- Assembly voted: June 2, 2022 (106-43)
- Senate voted: May 31, 2022 (43-20)
- Signed into law: June 20, 2022
- Governor: Kathy Hochul
- Section: N.Y. Elec. Law § 17-200–222
- Bill: S.1046-E / A.6678-E

Status: Current legislation

The John R. Lewis Voting Rights Act of New York (NYVRA) is a State Voting Rights Act (SVRA) modeled after the federal Voting Rights Act that is designed to prevent racial voter suppression and discrimination. It is named after the civil rights movement activist and congressman John Lewis. The act prohibits voter suppression, including vote dilution, voter intimidation, voter deception, and voter obstruction. It also establishes preclearance requirements for certain jurisdictions as well as expanded requirements for jurisdictions with a certain number of adult citizens with limited English proficiency.

== Legislative history ==
The NYVRA was introduced in the New York Senate as S.1046-E and in the New York Assembly as A.6678-E. On May 31, 2022, it passed the New York State Senate by a vote of 43 in favor and 20 against. On June 2, 2022, it passed the New York State Assembly by a vote of 106 in favor and 43 against. On June 20, 2022, Governor Kathy Hochul signed the NYVRA into law.

== Key provisions ==
=== Preclearance ===
The act creates a preclearance requirement for certain jurisdictions with a history of discrimination. These jurisdictions must seek approval from the New York Office of the Attorney General or a state court before making certain changes to their election procedures. This provision is modeled after Section 5 of the Voting Rights Act of 1965, which has been inactive since 2013 following the Supreme Court Case Shelby County v. Holder. The preclearance requirements of the NYVRA went into effect on September 22, 2024.

== Litigation ==
Several lawsuits were filed under the NYVRA beginning in 2024, including challenges to county legislative districts and at-large systems for electing town boards.

=== Nassau County redistricting ===
On February 7, 2024, New York Communities for Change and several voters filed a lawsuit against Nassau County challenging the 2023 redistricting plan for the Nassau County Legislature. The plaintiffs alleged that the map diluted the voting strength of Black, Latino, and Asian voters in violation of the NYVRA and other state-law requirements.

In January 2025, the parties reached a settlement to replace the challenged map with one containing six districts in which Black, Latino, and Asian residents constituted a majority of eligible voters. The map was to take effect for the county's November 2025 legislative elections and remain in effect until the next redistricting cycle after the 2030 census.

=== Clarke v. Town of Newburgh ===
In January 2024, six residents of the Town of Newburgh notified the town that its at-large method of electing members of the town board potentially violated the NYVRA. After the town board responded that it would investigate possible changes, the residents filed suit, alleging that the at-large system diluted the voting power of Black and Hispanic voters.

On November 7, 2024, Justice Maria Vazquez-Doles of the New York Supreme Court, Orange County, dismissed the case and declared the NYVRA unconstitutional. On January 30, 2025, the New York Supreme Court, Appellate Division reversed, holding that the town had not shown that compliance with the NYVRA would require it to violate equal-protection guarantees.

On November 20, 2025, the New York Court of Appeals affirmed the Appellate Division's order. The court held that Newburgh, as a political subdivision of the state, lacked capacity to bring a facial constitutional challenge to the NYVRA's vote-dilution provision, and that the case did not fall within a narrow exception allowing a municipality to challenge a state statute when compliance would force it to violate the constitution.

In February 2026, the town settled the lawsuit and agreed to adopt proportional ranked-choice voting for Town Council elections, replacing its prior at-large block voting system. WAMC reported that Newburgh became the first municipality in New York state to adopt proportional ranked-choice voting.

=== Other NYVRA lawsuits ===
In Young v. Town of Cheektowaga, filed in March 2024, a local resident challenged the at-large system used to elect the Cheektowaga Town Board, alleging racially polarized voting and vote dilution under the NYVRA.

In Serratto v. Town of Mount Pleasant, Hispanic voters challenged the at-large system used to elect the Mount Pleasant Town Board. In March 2026, the town approved a settlement under which it would move to district-based council elections, including a district centered on the Village of Sleepy Hollow, and expand the town board by two seats.

== See also ==
- Voting Rights Act of 1965
- California Voting Rights Act
- Voting Rights Act of Virginia
- Washington Voting Rights Act
- John R. Lewis Voting Rights Act of Connecticut
