= SVRA (disambiguation) =

SVRA usually refers to the Sportscar Vintage Racing Association, an American automobile club and sanctioning body for vintage car racing.

SVRA may also refer to:

- Shenandoah Valley Regional Airport, Virginia, US
- State Voting Rights Act, state-level voting legislation in the US
- State Vehicular Recreation Area, a type of recreation area for off-road vehicles in the US
