= Washington Voting Rights Act =

2018 law in the U.S. state of Washington

Washington State Legislature
- Full name: Washington Voting Rights Act of 2018
- Acronym: WVRA
- House voted: February 27, 2018 (52–46)
- Senate voted: March 5, 2018 (29–20)
- Signed into law: March 19, 2018
- Governor: Jay Inslee
- Bill: SB 6002
- Associated bills: HB 1048

Status: Current legislation (amended)

The Washington Voting Rights Act (WVRA) is a state law in the U.S. state of Washington that aims to protect voting rights and prevent discrimination. It is the second state level voting rights act to be enacted after the California Voting Rights Act was approved in 2002. It was enacted in the aftermath of a lawsuit against the city of Yakima under the federal Voting Rights Act of 1965. Among its provisions, the act allows individuals to issue a request for voting by districts as opposed to at-large elections, something that was a key issue in the lawsuit against Yakima. It also requires public notification of proposed changes to elections. In 2023 the Washington State Legislature passed HB 1048 to strengthen the WVRA. In 2023 the Washington Supreme Court upheld the WVRA in a unanimous (9–0) opinion.

== Legislative history ==
The state's Voting Rights Act was proposed in response to weakening of the federal Voting Rights Act. Among its provisions was the closing of a loophole that forbid cities in Washington of a certain size from using district-based elections for city councils unless they had switched from at-large elections prior to 1994.

=== SB 6002 ===
The WVRA was introduced as SB 6002 in the 2018 session of the Washington State Legislature. On January 19, 2018, it passed the Washington State Senate by a vote of 29 in favor and 19 against. On February 27, 2018, it passed the Washington House of Representatives as amended by a vote of 52 in favor and 46 against. The amended bill was then agreed to by the Washington State Senate by a vote of 29 in favor and 20 against. On March 19, 2018, Governor Jay Inslee signed the bill into law.

=== HB 1048 ===
HB 1048 (AN ACT Relating to enhancing the Washington voting rights act) was introduced in the 2023 session of the Washington State Legislature to strengthen the WVRA. It passed the Washington House of Representatives on March 4, 2023, by a vote of 57 in favor and 38 against. On April 5, 2023, the bill passed the Washington State Senate by a vote of 27 in favor and 21 against. It was signed into law by Governor Jay Inslee on April 13, 2023, and went into effect on January 1, 2024.

== Uses ==
The act has been used in two lawsuits filed against counties in Eastern Washington: one against Yakima County for alleged disenfranchisement of Latino voters; and another in Franklin County that alleged that Latino votes were diluted under the existing districts.

In the 2023 Franklin County case, the Washington Supreme Court found that limited voting, cumulative voting, and the single transferable vote (proportional ranked-choice voting) were potential remedies for violations of the Washington Voting Rights Act in a case regarding Latino representation.
