= State Voting Rights Act =

Act in the US

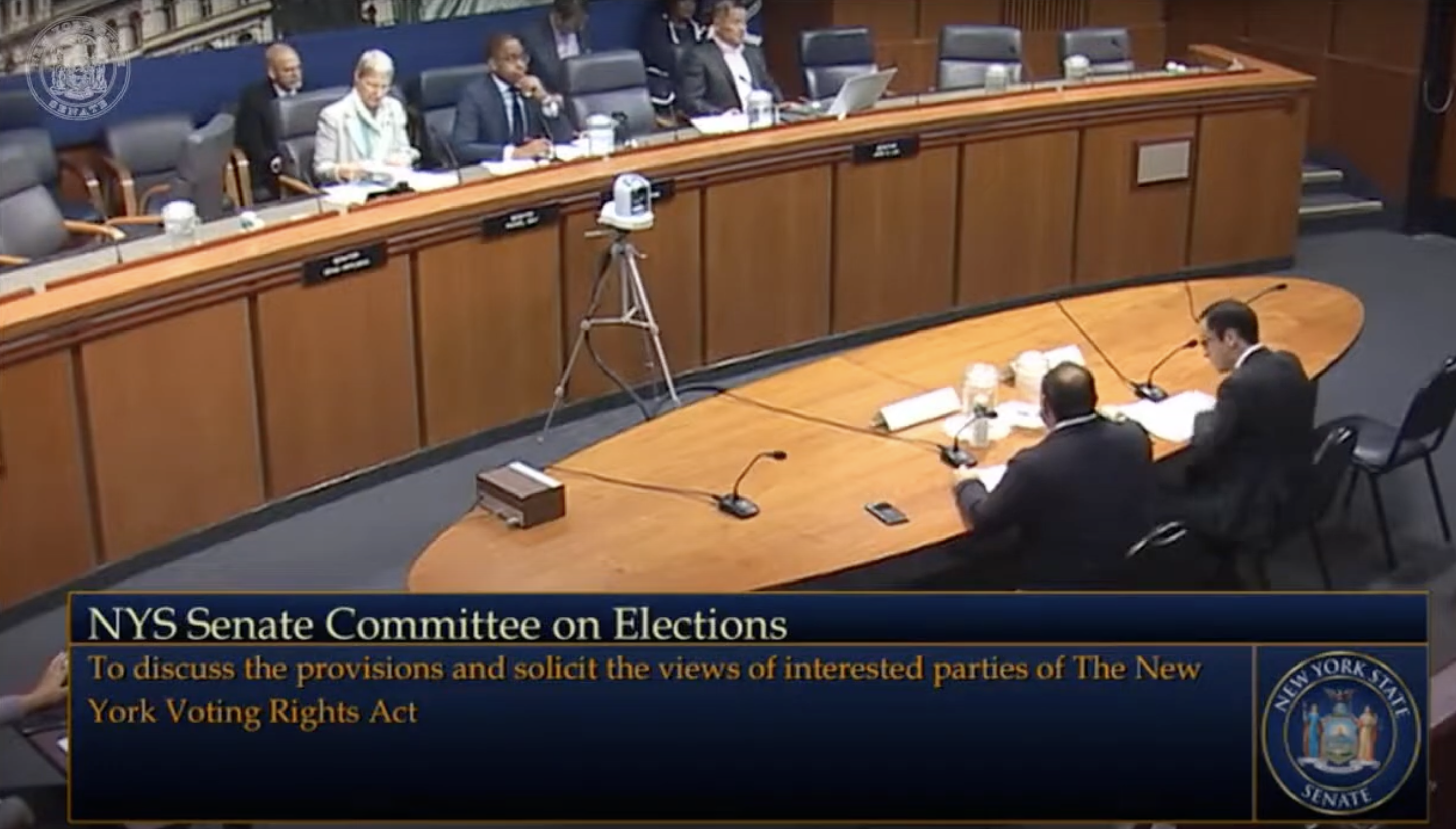
Michael Pernick Testimony - Public Hearing on the New York Voting Rights Act before the New York State Senate Standing Committee on Elections, March 3, 2020.

In the United States, a State Voting Rights Act (SVRA) is a state-level provision (either state constitutional amendment or state statute) that addresses racial discrimination in voting and provides protections beyond those offered by the federal Voting Rights Act of 1965. SVRAs seek to mitigate the impact of court decisions that have weakened the federal VRA, such as the 2013 decision in Shelby County v. Holder. By implementing preclearance measures and combating racial vote dilution, SVRAs create stronger protections for minority voters at the state level.

The first SVRA was enacted in 2002 in California. Nearly two decades later, the Washington Voting Rights Act was passed, followed by the Oregon Voting Rights Act a year later. In 2021, Virginia became the first southern state to do more than federal law requires to prevent racial discrimination in voting. In 2022, New York enacted what was then the most comprehensive SVRA, which served as a template for a similar law enacted in Connecticut in 2023. A pared down version of the NYVRA was passed in Minnesota in 2024.

== Background ==
The federal Voting Rights Act (VRA) of 1965 was a critical tool in addressing racial discrimination in voting, particularly in southern states. Its most potent provision was the preclearance requirement under Section 5, which mandated that certain jurisdictions with histories of discrimination obtain federal approval before changing voting laws. However, the U.S. Supreme Court's decision in Shelby County v. Holder (2013) invalidated the formula used to determine which jurisdictions were subject to preclearance, effectively weakening the VRA's protections.

After Shelby County, many states moved quickly to implement restrictive voting laws that had previously been subject to federal oversight. Since 2013, at least 29 states have passed 94 restrictive voting laws, including stricter voter ID requirements, reductions in early voting periods, and restrictions on mail-in voting. In 2023 alone, more than 322 restrictive voting bills were introduced in 45 states. The consequences of these laws have been especially harmful for minority voters. Research indicates that the racial turnout gap has grown significantly since the Shelby County decision. For example, in the 2022 midterm elections, the racial turnout gap was larger than in any midterm since at least 2006. Additionally, redistricting cycles following the Shelby County decision have led to significant dilution of political power for communities of color, with fewer opportunities to elect candidates of their choice.

== General Provisions of SVRAs ==
State Voting Rights Acts (SVRAs) primarily aim to combat racial vote denial, racial vote dilution, and retrogression, which are the same principal harms addressed by the federal Voting Rights Act. SVRAs often go beyond the protections offered by the federal Voting Rights Act by adopting stronger safeguards against voting discrimination.

=== Preclearance ===
Both the New York Voting Rights Act (NYVRA) and the Connecticut Voting Rights Act (CTVRA) include provisions that require certain electoral changes in covered jurisdictions to undergo preclearance before they can take effect. Preclearance was the key feature of the Voting Rights Act of 1965 before it was rendered inoperable by the Supreme Court in Shelby County v. Holder. Under the VRA, preclearance required jurisdictions with a history of racial discrimination in voting to receive approval from the federal government before implementing any changes to voting laws.

The Virginia Voting Rights Act (VAVRA) includes an opt-in preclearance system. Political subdivisions in Virginia may voluntarily choose to submit certain electoral changes, such as the relocation of polling places or the implementation of at-large elections, to the Virginia Attorney General for approval. If the changes are found to have a discriminatory purpose or effect, they are not allowed to be implemented.

=== Cause of Action ===
Like the Voting Rights Act of 1965, SVRAs provide an affirmative cause of action for plaintiffs to challenge discriminatory vote practices in state court. Most SVRAs strengthen protections against racial vote dilution beyond those offered by the Voting Rights Act of 1965. Racial vote dilution involves electoral practices that reduce the electoral power of minority groups without preventing them from voting. The California Voting Rights Act (CAVRA) and similar laws in other states have removed the first Gingles precondition, which requires that a minority group be geographically compact enough to constitute a majority in a single-member district.

Racial vote denial refers to laws or practices that disproportionately prevent minority voters from casting ballots. While Section 2 of the Voting Rights Act of 1965 prohibits such practices, the 2021 Supreme Court decision in Brnovich v. Democratic National Committee introduced new factors making it more difficult for plaintiffs to succeed in these cases. In response, some SVRAs, like those in New York and Connecticut, omit or replace the more restrictive Brnovich factors, providing broader protections for voters of color.

== Enacted SVRAs ==
Several states have enacted SVRAs, providing protections that go beyond the federal Voting Rights Act of 1965:

- California Voting Rights Act (CAVRA) of 2002: The first SVRA in the United States, CAVRA allows challenges to at-large election systems that dilute minority voting strength without requiring proof of geographical compactness.
- Washington Voting Rights Act (WAVRA) of 2018: Built on the framework of CAVRA, WAVRA enables minority voters to challenge local election systems where racially polarized voting denies fair representation.
- Oregon Voting Rights Act (ORVRA) of 2019: This SVRA is focused on ensuring that minority groups have equal opportunities to elect their preferred candidates in local elections.
- Virginia Voting Rights Act (VAVRA) of 2021: The first southern state to pass an SVRA, VAVRA mandates preclearance for certain voting changes and offers protections against vote denial and racial vote dilution.
- New York Voting Rights Act (NYVRA) of 2022: The most comprehensive SVRA enacted to date, NYVRA establishes a state preclearance system and includes broad protections against racial vote dilution and retrogression.
- Connecticut Voting Rights Act (CTVRA) of 2023: Modeled on the NYVRA, CTVRA offers extensive protections for minority voters and requires preclearance for certain voting changes.
- Minnesota Voting Rights Act (MNVRA) of 2024: A pared-down version of the NYVRA, it was enacted to address minority voter protections in Minnesota.
- Maryland Voting Rights Act (MDVRA) of 2026: This SVRA allows challenges to counties or municipalities that hold elections in a way that dilutes the votes cast by minority voters.

== Proposed SVRAs ==
Several states have proposed SVRAs modeled after existing laws, but these proposals have not yet passed:

- Michigan Voting Rights Act (MIVRA) of 2023: A set of four bills introduced in June 2023, aiming to establish a state-level preclearance system and combat racial vote dilution.
- Harry T. and Harriette V. Moore Voting Rights Act of Florida (FLVRA) of 2024: Introduced in January 2024, this proposed law seeks to establish protections similar to the NYVRA.
- John R. Lewis Voting Rights Act of New Jersey (NJVRA) of 2024: Based on the CTVRA, this proposed law was introduced in January 2024 to enhance voting protections for minority groups in New Jersey.

== Impact and Litigation ==
SVRAs have had a significant impact, especially in states like California, where over 100 jurisdictions have switched to district-based elections under CAVRA. In other states, SVRAs have become vital tools for challenging restrictive voting laws that disproportionately affect minority voters.

== See also ==
- Voting Rights Act of 1965
- Shelby County v. Holder
- Brnovich v. Democratic National Committee
