= Voting Rights Act of Virginia =

Election law in Virginia, United States

Virginia State Legislature
- Full name: Voting Rights Act of Virginia
- Introduced: January 8, 2021
- House voted: February 1, 2021
- Senate voted: February 25, 2021
- Sponsor(s): Del. Marcis S. "Cia" Price; Sen. Jennifer McClellan
- Governor: Ralph Northam
- Website: lis.virginia.gov

Status: Current legislation

The Voting Rights Act of Virginia is a Virginia law that prohibits racial discrimination in voting and establishes a preclearance provision for proposed changes to election administration, among other provisions. It is modeled after the federal Voting Rights Act of 1965, as well as the John Lewis Voting Rights Act (which would restore portions of the federal Voting Rights Act that were revoked in the 2013 Supreme Court case Shelby County v. Holder), and is the first voting rights act enacted in the American South. (Note: Outside of the south, California, Washington and Oregon have all enacted (narrower) voting rights acts.)

== Background ==
The Voting Rights Act was part of a surge of progressive legislation in Virginia (Note: Other measures have included abolishing the death penalty, raising the minimum wage, stricter gun control, establishing an independent redistricting commission intended to end gerrymandering, and allowing local governments to remove Confederate monuments.) following the recapture of the state legislature and governorship by the Democratic Party after a "generation" of Republican control. (Note: Furthermore, past Democratic control saw power in the hands of Southern Democrats—not modern-day liberal Democrats.) It also came at the same time Republican lawmakers across the country were engaging in a nationwide effort to make voting laws more restrictive following a failed attempt to overturn the victory of Democratic candidate Joe Biden in the 2020 presidential election. Indeed, the bill had been positioned as a major counterpoint to that effort, with Virginia Governor Ralph Northam stating, "At a time when voting rights are under attack across our country, Virginia is expanding access to the ballot box, not restricting it".

The bill was also viewed in light of the American south's long history of voter suppression, which was aimed principally at disenfranchising African Americans. As characterized by The New York Times:

Alone among the states of the former Confederacy, Virginia had become a voting rights bastion, increasingly encouraging its citizens — especially people of color — to exercise their voting rights. In the last 14 months, the state’s Democratic-controlled General Assembly and Mr. Northam have together repealed the state's voter ID law, enacted 45 days of no-excuse absentee voting, made Election Day a state holiday and enacted automatic voter registration for anyone who receives a Virginia driver's license (Note: Governor Ralph Northam had also recently restored the voting rights of nearly 70,000 formerly incarcerated Virginians.)...Ralph Northam this week (week of March 31, 2021) capped a multiyear liberal movement for greater ballot access by signing off on sweeping legislation to recreate pivotal elements of the federal Voting Rights Act that were struck down by the Supreme Court's conservative majority in 2013.

The bill was framed in particular as a direct, state-level response to the 2013 ruling of the Supreme Court of the United States in Shelby County v. Holder, which eliminated the federal Department of Justice's authority under the federal Voting Rights Act to assess voting laws suspected of violating the Act (“[resulting] in the denial or abridgement of the right of any citizen to vote on account of race or color") in Southern states with a history of racial discrimination in voting (which included Virginia) through a federal ‘preclearance’ process (ie. requiring prior clearance before coming into force). Indeed, it was partially modeled after the John Lewis Voting Rights Advancement Act, a proposed federal law that would restore the federal pre-clearance provision. As summarized by the New York Times, "Virginia, which for nearly 50 years had to submit changes to its elections to the federal government for approval under the Voting Rights Act's preclearance requirements, has now effectively imposed the same covenants on itself, an extraordinary step for a state with a long history of segregation and racially targeted voting laws".

== Key provisions ==
=== Prohibition of discriminatory voting laws ===
The Act prohibits racial discrimination or intimidation related to voting. Specifically, the act states:

No voting qualification or prerequisite to voting or standard, practice, or procedure shall be imposed or applied by the state or any locality in a manner that results in a denial or abridgement of the right of any citizen of the United States to vote based on race or color or membership in a language minority group.

It empowers the state Attorney General to sue in cases of voter suppression.

=== Preclearance ===
Inspired by the preclearance requirement in the federal Voting Rights Act of 1965, which required some states and other jurisdictions with histories of racial discrimination in voting to clear any changes to election procedure with the federal government, the Voting Rights Act of Virginia requires local election officials to collect public feedback or receive advance approval from the state Attorney General before making changes to local elections. More specifically, it would give localities the option of either asking the attorney general's office to sign off on any changes or publicizing the proposed change and allowing a public comment period of at least 30 days, followed by a 30-day waiting period in which any person potentially affected by the change would have the right to challenge it in court. The measure is intended to prevent voter suppression efforts by local officials.

=== Special accommodations ===
==== Minority language accessibility ====
The bill would require local election officials to provide voting materials in foreign languages if a sizable portion of the local population has a primary language that is not English (this is already required by US law for federal elections—this bill mandates it for local elections as well).

==== Disability assistance ====
The bill mandates that people who have disabilities that make them unable to read or write must be provided assistance and allows voters who are over 65 or disabled to request and be brought a printed ballot outside of a polling location.

=== Voter Outreach and Education Fund ===
The bill establishes the Voter Education and Outreach Fund, to be funded by penalties awarded as a result of voting discrimination.

== Legislative history ==
The Act (originally House Bill 1890) was introduced into the House of Delegates by Delegate Marcia Price (D) on January 15, 2021. It passed the House on February 1, 2021 in a 55–45 vote (all Democrats for, all Republicans against). On February 25, 2021, it passed the state Senate with unanimous support from Democrats and unanimous opposition by Republicans.

On March 31, 2021, Governor Ralph Northam (D) gave the bill preliminary approval, though suggested technical amendments that the General Assembly had to approve before the measure became law. On April 7, 2021, the state legislature approved the changes.

== Reactions ==
The Act has been contrasted with concurrent Republican efforts in other states to make voting laws more restrictive. The bill's sponsor Marcia Price, for instance, has said that "Virginia is standing strong against a coordinated and intentional effort to restrict voting rights across the nation. These targeted restrictions are designed to disenfranchise people of color, working Americans, and non-native English speakers. With this bill, our Commonwealth is taking the opposite approach and we are making a bold statement against voter suppression. We are upholding the dignity, voice, and vote of all Virginians." Marcia Johnson-Blanco, co-director of the Voting Rights Project at the Lawyers' Committee for Civil Rights Under Law, praised the bill similarly, saying, "The Voting Rights Act of Virginia shows just how far a state with roots from the darkest days of racism in this country can come, and will be a model for the entire nation. This legislation stands in stark contrast to the regressive bills that have been adopted and proposed in other states that will make it more difficult for people to vote." State Senator Jennifer McClellan likewise stated, "The Voting Rights Act of Virginia is a huge victory for our democracy. While other states are threatening voting rights, Virginia took a major step today to protect the right to vote."

Republicans in both the Virginia House of Delegates and the Virginia Senate unanimously opposed the bill, arguing that it would inundate local election administrators with lawsuits and complicate routine changes to voting. The Virginia Municipal League and the Virginia Association of Counties opposed the bill, contending that it could create burdensome new complications for minor election changes. Some registrars worried the penalties for improperly discounting ballots could punish election workers for innocent errors made in a fast-paced and demanding work environment.

== See also ==
- Black suffrage in the United States
- Voter suppression in the United States
- Jim Crow
- Election Integrity Act of 2021
- State Voting Rights Act
