= California Voting Rights Act =

California voting legislation

California State Legislature
- Full name: California Voting Rights Act of 2001
- Acronym: CVRA
- Introduced: February 23, 2001
- Signed into law: July 9, 2002
- Sponsor(s): Sen. Richard Polanco
- Governor: Gray Davis
- Code: Elections Code
- Section: CA Elec Code §§ 14025-14032
- Bill: S.B. 976

Status: Current legislation

The California Voting Rights Act of 2001 (CVRA) is a State Voting Rights Act (SVRA) in the state of California. It makes it easier for minority groups in California to prove that their votes are being diluted in "at-large" elections by expanding on the federal Voting Rights Act of 1965. In Thornburg v. Gingles (1986), the Supreme Court of the United States ruled that there are certain conditions that must be met in order to prove that minorities are being disenfranchised: that the affected minority group is sufficiently large to elect a representative of its choice, that the minority group is politically cohesive, and that white majority voters vote sufficiently as a bloc to usually defeat the minority group's preferred candidates; the CVRA eliminated one of these requirements. Unlike the Voting Rights Act of 1965, which is a federal law, the CVRA does not require plaintiffs to demonstrate a specific geographic district where a minority is concentrated enough to establish a majority. Certain cities that have never had minority representation or have a history of minority candidate suppression can be liable for triple damages and be forced to make changes within 90 days. That makes it easier for minority voters to sue local governments and eliminate at-large elections. The Act was eventually signed into law on 9 July 2002.

In 2006, California's Fifth District Court of Appeal ruled the act constitutional in Sanchez v. City of Modesto. The city claimed that the act was unconstitutional because it inherently favored people of color. The court concluded that the act was not racist in nature and returned the case to the trial court.

Critics of the act argue that it inappropriately makes race a predominant factor in elections and that it does not make sense to eliminate the requirement to establish a geographic district in which there is a minority concentration. Advocates argue that at-large elections allow bloc voting, which effectively keeps minorities out of office.

== Legislative history ==
Seal of California

The bill was introduced to the California State Senate by Democratic Senator Richard Polanco. The bill was endorsed by both the American Civil Liberties Union and the Mexican American Legal Defense and Educational Fund. The bill passed on the Senate floor with a vote of 22 to 13, and passed on the assembly floor with a vote of 47 to 25. The Act was signed into law by Governor Gray Davis on July 9, 2002.

In 2016, the California legislature passed Assembly Bill 350, which amended Section 10010 of the elections code to provide a 45-day "safe harbor" limit after the receipt of a letter from potential plaintiffs in CVRA cases. The amendment took effect on January 1, 2017, and prevents lawsuits during the 45-day period. If the city makes legal moves towards district elections during that 45-day period, it cannot be sued for an additional 90 days after it makes a legal declaration. The city must then hold at least two public hearings on the matter within 30 days. The amendments to section 10010 also put a limit of $30,000 on the amount the city must pay to potential litigants if the city moves to district elections within the 90 day period. The CVRA and Section 10010 also apply to charter cities, but the section's application to enable charter cities to use an ordinance to go to district elections has not been tested in court.

== Impact ==
=== Overview ===
Primarily, the CVRA makes it easier for minority groups to sue governments that use at-large elections on the grounds that they dilute the strength of minority votes. The CVRA also requires the government to pay all legal and court fees for the plaintiff if the plaintiff win, including cases in which the government chooses to settle before a verdict is reached. By 2009, three cases had been successfully brought against local governments; all three resulted in the elimination of at-large elections (and the drawing of district lines). A total of $4.3 million has been paid to compensate attorney's fees.

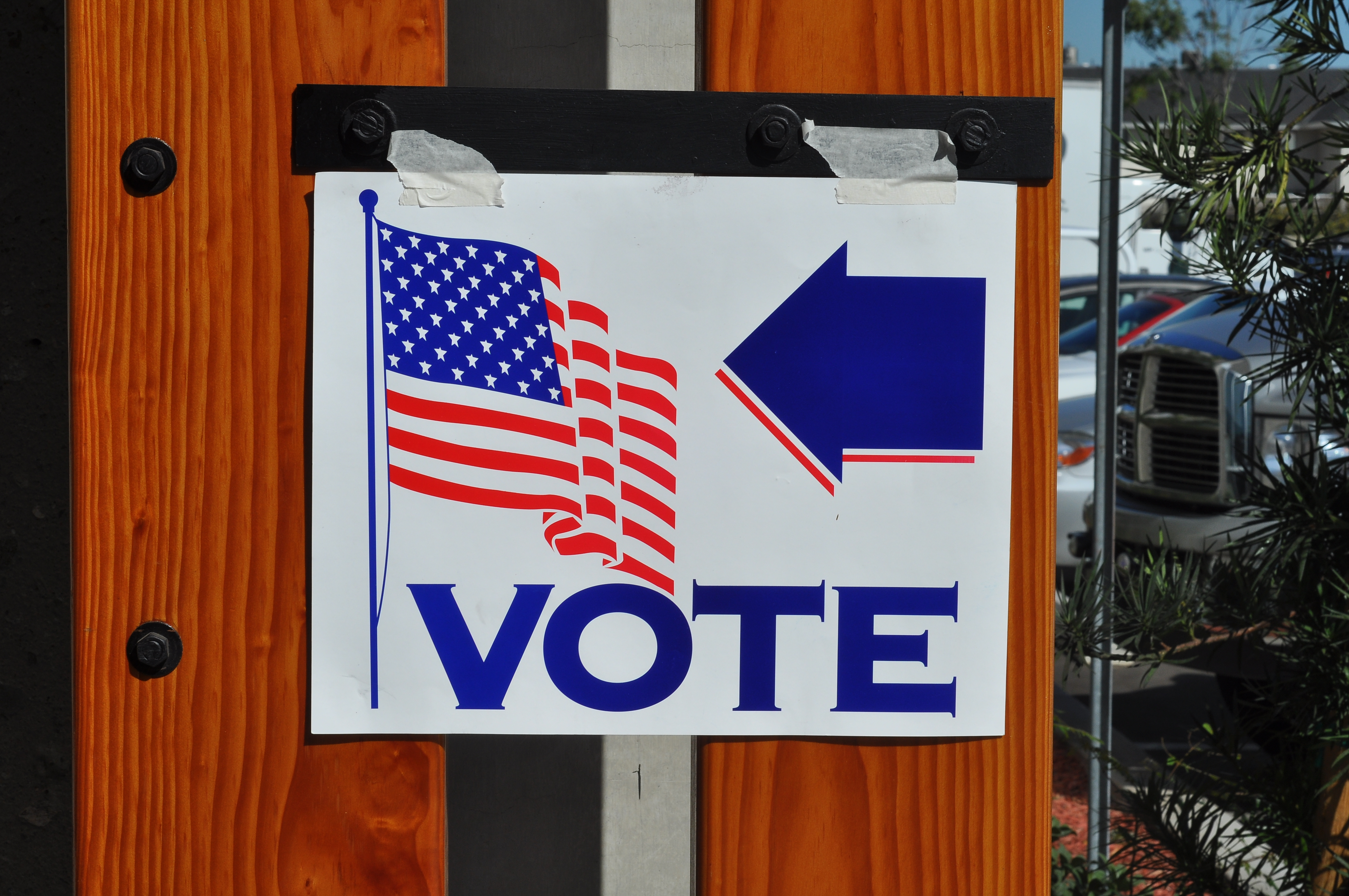
Directional Sign for Voting Location in California

=== Proponents ===
Supporters of the CVRA championed how much easier it made it for minority groups to dismantle at-large elections; minorities no longer had to prove that a specific minority candidate lost because of racially-polarized voting, they had to prove only that racially-polarized voting existed. Luis Artega, executive director of the Latino Issues Forum, supported the bill and claimed, "We have long been aware that at-large elections in a racially polarized electorate effectively work to dilute Latino voice and influence". The law has in practice served the Latino population, but it applies to all ethnic minorities. Regardless of whether racially polarized voting exists, some argue that at-large elections allow a majority voice to control the entire populace and therefore prefer elections by district. When district lines are drawn with purpose by using census data, it is important to ensure that minority votes are not further fractured and diluted.

=== Adversaries ===
Critics of the CVRA argue that the act makes race a predominant factor in elections and that eliminating at-large elections does not make sense if a minority cannot occupy and establish a majority in a specific geographic area. John McDermott, the defense attorney for the City of Modesto in its case under the CVRA, claimed that the CVRA is a radical departure from the federal Voting Rights Act and argued that at-large elections can be threatened under the law even if there is no proof that a minority group either suffered a disadvantage or would benefit from districts. Others say the law is unnecessary and argue that the number of minorities holding office was on the rise before the act passed and that the law is being used to "shake down" local governments. General supporters of at-large elections say they encourage candidates to encompass many viewpoints and represent diverse groups.

Another criticism arose from the section of the act maintaining that if a government loses or settles, it is required to pay the attorney's fees of the plaintiffs. Attorney Kevin Shenkman has been particularly criticized after he had won many cases against cities in Southern California, with over 50 cities shifting to districts and paying high legal fees to his firm whether they lost or settled.

== Court cases and settlements ==
Since the CVRA applies to the 58 counties, over 480 cities, and over 1,000 school districts in California, it is difficult to list all of the jurisdictions that have gone to districts or are in the process of doing so in response to the CVRA. Several sources list a selection of jurisdictions that have moved to districts but as the legal issues are clarified by court decisions and state laws, the number of cases brought and settled has increased. The Southwest Voter Registration Education Project (SVREP) has a partial list published in 2016. The Rose Institute of State and Local Government of Claremont McKenna College in a "White Paper" analysed the effect of the CVRA with a partial list of cities that have gone to districts as of 2016. The Lawyers Committee for Civil Rights lists over 118 school districts that have gone to districts as of 2014 because of the CVRA. The League of California Cities has a set of PowerPoint Slides which describe the CVRA process after AB350 amended California elections Code 10010 which includes some case studies.

After the 2016 modifications to Section 10010, settlements became simpler and less expensive.

=== City of Visalia ===
In May 2014, the City of Visalia settled a CVRA lawsuit two months after it was filed for $125,000. A ballot measure to move to district elections failed and a settlement was soon thereafter reached with a stipulated judgement. The court ordered single member districts.

=== City of Escondido ===
The City of Escondido agreed in 2013 to a settlement to pay $385,000 in legal fees to the plaintiffs. At the time, Latinos made up 49% of the population, but in the previous 125 years, only two Latinos had been elected to the city council. The districts were to be drawn up by a seven-member panel selected by retired San Diego County judges. The city council could not alter the panel's district boundaries but could reject the map as drawn. The city said that it paid $200,000 to its own attorneys. The City Council's Ballot Measure P to go to districts had been rejected by 53% in November 2012.

=== Madera Unified School District ===
In 2008, Maria Esther Rey, Jesse Lopez, and Carlos Uranga filed a suit against the Madera Unified School District under the CVRA. Plaintiffs contended that the at-large system of elections diluted the Latino vote. Although the district immediately moved to remedy the situation, the plaintiffs also argued that the upcoming 2008 "at-large" elections should be enjoined which was ordered by the trial court. The 5th District Court of Appeals awarded $162,500 in legal fees to the plaintiffs in 2012.

=== Newport-Mesa Unified School District ===
In 2017, the Newport-Mesa Unified School District settled out of court with Eloisa Rangel for $105,937. Ms. Rangel sued the district in Orange County Superior Court to promote greater representation of Latino members. Kevin Shenkman, a Malibu-based attorney represented Rangel.

=== Hanford Joint Unified School District ===
A suit brought by the Lawyers Committee for Civil Rights in 2003 was settled in 2004. The first case to use the CVRA did not go to court. Plaintiffs were paid $110,000. Although 40% of the district was Latino, no Latino had been elected to the school board in over 20 years.

=== Ceres Unified School District ===
In 2009, the Ceres Unified School district was reported to have paid $3,000 to settle with plaintiffs, who were also permitted to draw the district boundaries.

=== Compton Community College District ===
On March 31, 2012, the Compton Community College District (CCCD) agreed to pay Joaquin Avila $40,000 "in settlement of all fees and costs associated with the" litigation. Mr. Avila was a professor of law at Seattle University. The National Demographics Corporation describes it as a "friendly" lawsuit.

=== Sanchez v. City of Modesto ===
In 2004, the Lawyers Committee for Civil Rights filed a suit under the CVRA against the City of Modesto on behalf of three Latino residents. The committee claimed that racially-polarized voting was keeping Latinos out of office; the city had had only one Latino council member since 1911 even though the Latino population exceeded 25 percent. County Superior Court Judge Roger Beauchesne sided with the city and declared the law unconstitutional. Beauchesne said the law showed preference to minorities without requiring them to demonstrate need and ruled that the requirement for the city to pay attorney's fees was an unconstitutional gift of money. The case was appealed to the 5th District Court of Appeals who struck down the initial ruling, siding with the law. The city appealed the case to the California Supreme Court, claiming that the law allowed reverse racism and constituted unconstitutional affirmative action. The state Supreme Court refused to hear the case and sent it case back to trial court.

The case ended in settlement after the city voted on a ballot measure to use district voting by 2009. Although the city settled, they were still responsible for paying $3 million in fees for the defendants' lawyers.

=== Gomez v. Hanford Joint Union School District ===
In July 2003, the school district of Hanford was sued by Latino voters, backed by civil rights organizations, under the CVRA; the suit claimed that racially-polarized voting had negatively affected the ability of Latinos to assume office (there had not been a Latino on the district's board of trustees in 20 years despite a population that was 38 percent Latino). The city chose to settle and agreed to use by district voting for the board of trustees. It was the first case to be settled under the CVRA. Although the case never went to trial, the district had to pay $110,000 in attorney's fees to the plaintiffs as a part of the settlement.

=== Lawyers Committee for Civil Rights v. Madera Unified School District ===
In August 2008, the Lawyers Committee for Civil Rights filed suit against the Madera Unified School District on behalf of three Latino residents. The plaintiffs pointed out that while 82 percent of students in Madera were Latino (though only 44 percent of those eligible to vote were Latinos), only one out of seven board members was Latino. The city, instead of going to trial, agreed to draw district lines. The district spokesman, Jake Bragonier, said the decision to avoid trial was a "business decision" in reference to the possibility of having to pay attorney's fees.

The committee also asked the court to throw out the previous November's elections. Judge James Oakley ruled against the school board and threw out the November election results. The ruling meant that the school district was officially the losing party and was required to pay the $1.2 million in attorney's fees to the plaintiffs, but a Superior Court judge later reduced the amount by 85% to $162,500.

The 2010 election resulted in four Latino board members. Before this, there had been only one. This was the first case under the CVRA that was decided by a judge, not a settlement.

=== Pico Neighborhood Association v. City of Santa Monica ===
The city of Santa Monica was sued by the Pico Neighborhood Association in Los Angeles County Superior Court, arguing that the city's plurality at-large method for electing city council members violated the CVRA and diluted the votes of the city's Latino minority population. On February 15, 2019 he trial court agreed with the plaintiffs, ordering the City to switch to a by-district voting system and mandating a special election for July 2019. The city requested a stay of the decision and appealed the case to the Court of Appeal for the Second District, which, on July 9, 2020, ruled in favor of the city and applied the historic federal test for vote dilution to the case, finding that the plaintiffs had not proven dilution because they had failed to show that drawing districts would create a minority-majority district. The plaintiffs appealed it to the Supreme Court of California, becoming the first CVRA case to be accepted by the apex court.

On August 24, 2023, the Supreme Court unanimously reversed most of the Court of Appeal's decision, finding the federal test adopted by the Court of Appeal to be insufficient for establishing vote dilution, while affirming that vote dilution is a required element for a CVRA case but separate from proving racially-polarized voting patterns. Instead, the Supreme Court prescribed a new burden for plaintiffs to prove vote dilution under the CVRA, namely if "when, under some lawful alternative election system, the minority group would have the potential, on its own or with the help of crossover voters, to elect its preferred candidate." The Supreme Court namely suggested proportional multi-winner versions of voting systems including Ranked-choice voting, Cumulative voting and Limited voting as alternative remedies to single-winner minority-majority districts for vote dilution.

The Supreme Court remanded the case back to the Court of Appeal for further review, which then remanded the case to Los Angeles County Superior Court to apply the Supreme Court's judgment to the case. As of 2025, the Supreme Court's decision has yet to be applied to the case, nor has a settlement been reached.

=== AC Transit ===
In 2023, the AC Transit Board of Directors voted to transition from hybrid ward-based and at-large elections to solely ward-based elections. This decision was based upon a March 27, 2023, letter received by the District from "lawyers alleging that the District’s method of electing two of the seven members of the District’s Board of Directors in at-large elections instead of by-ward elections violates the California Voting Rights Act".

== 2026 amendments ==
In 2026, State Senator Sabrina Cervantes filed SB 1164 and SB 1360 (together described as the "California Voting Rights Act of 2026") to update the CVRA to prohibit vote dilution, mandate preclearance, expand assistance for language-minority voters, expand private right of action to ensure non-governmental plaintiffs the ability to sue in state court, and direct courts to interpret the law in favor of broad access and equal protection in the voting process. SB 1164 was passed by the Senate on May 20, 2026, while SB 1360 was passed on May 22.

In September 2026, the California Voting Rights Act was amended to include "share-based methods" to remedy voting rights act disputes. The bill defines a share-based method as "one in which more than one candidate is to be elected and different groups of voters may each elect their preferred candidates to the seats to fill based on their relative share of the votes cast". The definition is compatible with proportional or semi-proportional elections. The bill requires that any multi-member elections have at least three seats per district. The amendment allows for multi-member districts to be used in voting rights act disputes rather than defaulting to majority-minority districts.
