= Klopfer v. North Carolina =

- Supreme Court of the United States

Argued December 8, 1966 Decided March 13, 1967
- Full case name: Peter H. Klopfer, Petitioner v. State of North Carolina.
- Citations: 386 U.S. 213 (more) 87 S. Ct. 988; 18 L. Ed. 2d 1

Case history
- Prior: State v. Klopfer, 266 N.C. 349, 145 S.E.2d 909 (1966); cert. granted, 384 U.S. 959 (1966).

Holding
- By indefinitely postponing prosecution, the State denied petitioner the right to a speedy trial guaranteed by the Sixth Amendment to the United States Constitution

Court membership
- Chief Justice Earl Warren Associate Justices Hugo Black · William O. Douglas; Tom C. Clark · John M. Harlan II; William J. Brennan Jr. · Potter Stewart; Byron White · Abe Fortas

Case opinions
- Majority: Warren, joined by Black, Douglas, Clark, Brennan, White, Fortas
- Concurrence: Harlan
- Concurrence: Stewart

Laws applied
- U.S. Const. amends. VI, XIV

Klopfer v. North Carolina, 386 U.S. 213 (1967), was a decision by the United States Supreme Court involving the application of the Speedy Trial Clause of the United States Constitution in state court proceedings. The Sixth Amendment in the Bill of Rights states that in criminal prosecutions "...the accused shall enjoy the right to a speedy trial" In this case, a defendant was tried for trespassing and the initial jury could not reach a verdict. The prosecutor neither dismissed nor reinstated the case but used an unusual procedure to leave it open, potentially indefinitely. Klopfer argued that this denied him his right to a speedy trial. In deciding in his favor, the Supreme Court incorporated the speedy trial protections of the Sixth Amendment against the states.

== Prior history ==
On January 3, 1964, Peter Klopfer, a civil rights activist and Duke University biology professor protesting segregation at Watts Restaurant and Grill, supposedly entered the property of Austin Watts in Chapel Hill, North Carolina and refused to leave when directed. In February of that year, the grand jury for Orange County indicted him for criminal trespass. He pleaded not guilty and the jury was unable to reach a verdict in a short trial at the Orange Superior Court that March. The prosecutor moved for nolle prosequi with leave, a variation of nolle prosequi that was particular to North Carolina. The Superior Court granted the motion.

The effect of granting this motion meant that Klopfer was not completely free of charges. When a case is normally halted on a prosecutor's motion for nolle prosequi, a judge's approval is required to restart proceedings. In North Carolina at the time, a court granting a nolle prosequi with leave motion implicitly granted this permission ahead of time. This allowed the prosecutor to restore the case for trial without seeking further permission and the statute of limitations would not be a barrier to re-instating the prosecution at any time. Klopfer's attorney argued that this was a violation of the right to a speedy trial since it left the charges hanging over Klopfer's head indefinitely, interfering with his right to travel and his professional activity.

Klopfer made this speedy trial argument in appealing to the North Carolina Supreme Court. That Court considered the right to a speedy trial to only apply if there was a trial. In attempting to force the prosecutor to dispose of the case definitively, the Court held the defendant was attempting to compel prosecution by the State and interfering with the prosecutor's discretion. It held that this discretion was within "customary procedure" and not reviewable. It therefore affirmed the lower court's granting of the motion.

== Decision ==
The United States Supreme Court took the case in part to decide if, contrary to the lower Court's opinion, the Sixth Amendment protections on speedy trial applied to state court hearings. The opinion written by Chief Justice Warren, began by reviewing the legal basis for the nolle prosequi with leave motion, calling it an "unusual North Carolina criminal procedural device" and an "extraordinary criminal procedure". The Court found that there was nothing to sustain use of the procedure in either North Carolina statute or in the common law of that state.

In considering the application of this type of motion to Klopfer's case, it noted that the initial indictment was within a month of the supposed offense, but that the State's motion was not granted until August 9, 1965. After waiting over a year and a half for disposition of the case, the Superior Court had then granted the State's motion over Klopfer's objections and with no justification offered by the prosecutor. Klopfer, a professor of zoology at Duke University, complained to the Court that the indefinite suspension of the case interfered with his employment and his right to travel.

Where the North Carolina Supreme Court had dismissed Klopfer's speedy trial argument in one sentence, Warren's decision extensively reviewed the history of the right to a speedy trial. He traced it to sources of English common law as old as the Assize of Clarendon in 1166 and the Magna Carta in 1215. Not only was American common law heir to the English legal tradition, but Warren also found that many of the founding fathers were schooled in that tradition and had studied English law and intended its rights to apply to Americans. The right to a speedy trial was guaranteed in the federal Constitution and in many early state constitutional documents. By 1967, it was guaranteed in some fashion by each of the 50 states. Warren called it "...one of the most basic rights preserved by our Constitution."

The Court also held that the Sixth Amendment's speedy trial guarantee applied to the states. Building on Gideon v. Wainwright, 372 U.S. 335 (1963), Malloy v. Hogan, 378 U.S. 1 (1964), and Pointer v. Texas, 380 U.S. 400 (1965), the Court held that "...the right to a speedy trial is as fundamental as any of the rights secured by the Sixth Amendment" and applied to the states through the Fourteenth Amendment. The lower court's opinion was overturned.

== Effects of the decision ==
This case was later cited by the Supreme Court 22 times. This case was part of the legal history of applying the Federal Constitution's protections as enshrined in the Bill of Rights to cases arising in state courts. In Smith v. Hooey, 393 U.S. 374 (1969), it extended this protection to require speedy prosecutions of defendants even when held across state lines from the indicting court and in Dickey v. Florida, 398 U.S. 30 (1970) it held the same applied to defendants held by authorities at another location in the same state. It did not, however, define "speedy" until the case of Barker v. Wingo, 407 U.S. 514 (1972), setting out a four-part test to be used to judge if a delay was prejudicial or not. The North Carolina laws were changed to eliminate the nolle prosequi with leave motion in 1973, allowing prosecutors to voluntarily dismiss charges without tolling the statute of limitations. State law allows prosecutors to file for a voluntary dismissal with leave to re-instate charges when the delay is caused by the defendant’s own actions, such as a failure to appear or incapacity to stand trial.

== See also ==
- List of United States Supreme Court cases, volume 386
- List of United States Supreme Court cases
