= Continuance =

Postponement of legal proceedings

In American procedural law, a continuance is the postponement of a hearing, trial, or other scheduled court proceeding at the request of either or both parties in the dispute, or by the judge sua sponte. In response to delays in bringing cases to trial, some states have adopted "fast-track" rules that sharply limit the ability of judges to grant continuances. However, a motion for continuance may be granted when necessitated by unforeseeable events, or for other reasonable cause articulated by the movant (the person seeking the continuance), especially when the court deems it necessary and prudent in the "interest of justice."

== Criminal cases ==
=== In general ===
Although a continuance is the result of a court order issued by the judge in a trial or hearing, it also can come from a statute or law. The terms continuance and postponement are frequently used interchangeably.

The burden of scheduling trials, which includes assembling witnesses, lawyers and jurors at the same time, is not usually a reason to grant continuances in criminal cases, except for compelling reasons.

A person accused of a crime has certain rights defined by the federal constitution, state constitutions and various statutes, such as the right to be represented by counsel, the right to compulsory process (issue of subpoena ad testificandum and subpoena duces tecum) to secure the attendance of witnesses, gather evidence and the right to a speedy trial. In some cases, denial of a continuance may infringe on such rights and amount to a violation of due process—which could result in dismissal of an indictment, or provide grounds for reversal.

Courts will lend a defendant all practicable help in securing evidence necessary for a defense, if it is sought in a timely manner. It is usual to grant a continuance if there is a problem in gathering evidence or the serving of subpoenas upon witnesses, if the defendant is not at fault for the delay. (See Powell v. Alabama)

Once accused of a crime, the prosecutor has a right to a reasonable opportunity to secure the personal attendance of a witness. A continuance is proper if it appears due diligence has failed to procure the presence of a witness. It must be shown that it is reasonably certain the witness' presence will be subsequently secured, and that the expected testimony will be material to the accused's defense.

=== The Federal Speedy Trial Act of 1974 ===
Under the Sixth Amendment to the United States Constitution, a person accused of a crime and facing a criminal prosecution, is guaranteed the right to a speedy trial. Various state constitutions also guarantee this right.

The Federal Speedy Trial Act of 1974 operates to implement an accused person's constitutional right to a speedy trial. Factors considered by the courts within the Speedy Trial Act are:

- Whether the failure to grant a continuance in the proceeding would be a miscarriage of justice.
- Whether the trial is so complex, the gathering of witnesses and evidence so burdensome, or the fact situation so unusual that a continuance should be granted.
- The arrest precedes the indictment or the fact situation is complex.
- The failure to grant such a continuance in a case is enough to deny the defendant reasonable time to obtain counsel, or effective preparation.

The result of this law has been that many continuances previously issued have been denied.

Unless the defendant consents in writing to the contrary, a trial may not commence less than 30 days from the date when the defendant first appears through counsel or expressly waives counsel or elects to proceed pro se (without a lawyer). Case law of the Speedy Trial Act is found in 16 ALR 4th p. 1283 et seq.

A defendant's rights under the Speedy Trial Clause of the Sixth Amendment are triggered by "either a formal indictment or information or else the actual restraints imposed by arrest and holding (imprisonment) to answer a criminal charge."

In the 1972 Barker v. Wingo case, the United States Supreme Court set out a four-factor test for determining whether delay between the initiation of criminal proceedings and the beginning of a trial violates the Sixth Amendment right to a speedy trial. The court must consider:

- The length of delay.
- The cause of the delay.
- The defendant's assertion of his rights to a speedy trial.
- The presence or absence of prejudice resulting from the delay.

Appeal Courts routinely reject Sixth Amendment challenges to a speedy trial, after a criminal conviction. The case of United States v. Loud Hawk did not consider a 90-month delay in trial excessive. In that case, there had been a series of motions consuming a great deal of time.

In the 1992 case of Doggett v. United States, the United States Supreme Court considered an 8½ year delay between indictment and criminal trial excessive.

=== Continuance because of excessive press coverage ===
Sometimes press coverage of a criminal act and the trial can become excessive. This is usually greater in one part of the jurisdiction than others. Coverage is often greater in the time immediately following the commission of the crime and also after a high profile arrest. The question becomes: does the excessive coverage, including editorial speculation, so color the potential jury pool that a fair trial cannot be had? A continuance of the criminal trial can be granted to transfer the trial to another part of the jurisdiction, or to let passions cool. The movement of the trial is called a change of venue.

Federal Rule of Criminal Procedure 21 (a) provides for the transfer of proceedings to another district if the judge is satisfied that there exists a prejudicial atmosphere. To meet the requirements for a transfer, the trial judge must determine that there exists so great a prejudice in favor of the prosecution or against the defendant that there is a reasonable likelihood the defendant cannot obtain a fair and impartial trial. In the famous 1966 Sam Sheppard case, (Sheppard v. Maxwell) the United States Supreme Court held that where there was a reasonable likelihood that the prejudicial news prior to trial will prevent a fair trial, the judge should continue the case until the threat abates, or transfer it to another county not so permeated with publicity. This doctrine has been annunciated in other cases.

There is reason to believe that courts do not generally grant a change of venue upon a reasonable likelihood of prejudice from pre-trial publicity. A showing of actual prejudice usually is required unless the state (prosecution) effectively concedes prejudice.

In the 1981 California case of Martinez v. Superior Court the court used the "reasonable likelihood of prejudice standard" to grant a mandamus petition and order a change of venue in a murder prosecution. The court emphasized extensive publicity over the course of a year prior to the trial, the small size of the county where the trial was to be held, and the gravity of the charge. The court observed that the status of the victim and the accused in the community are significant, but not necessarily controlling factors in ruling on a venue change request.

In the 1982 California case of Odle v. Superior Court the California Supreme Court did not find there had been any reasonable likelihood of prejudice from pretrial publicity.

The usual approach is to demand a showing of actual prejudice. In the 1981 case of People v. Botham, the Colorado court overturned the defendant's murder conviction partly because there had been a denial of a change of venue. The court emphasized the number of jurors who had expressed an opinion that the defendant was guilty, the number who had been exposed to pretrial publicity, the juror's knowledge of the details of the crime, and the information that was brought forth on voir dire to find that the defendant met the burden of showing a presumption of partiality.

A more typical finding is seen in Swindler v. State, a 1991 case from Arkansas that upheld the death penalty and rejected challenges to jury bias and change of venue motion where three jurors were seated who had read and heard about the case, and over 80% of the jurors called were excused for cause. Extensive case law is discussed.

Perhaps the most famous case in pre-trial publicity is that of Sheppard v. Maxwell argued by F. Lee Bailey. Sam Sheppard, a doctor was convicted of second degree murder of his wife. The case had been subjected to a large amount of pre-trial news coverage and widespread speculation about Sheppard's guilt. The United States Supreme Court ruled that the case should be remanded for a new trial, opining that the trial court should have limited news access prior to the trial.

Change of venue requests, choice of a new venue and where the new venue is sought because of local prejudice varies in different jurisdictions. General case law is discussed.

=== Absence of witness or evidence ===
Continuances are traditionally granted to allow the defendant additional time for procuring an absent witness, or other evidence necessary for the defense or the prosecution of the applicant's case.

Several factors are considered in issuing a continuance on the ground that a witness or evidence is absent:

- The expected evidence or witness is material and competent to the trial.
- There is a probability that the evidence will be forthcoming if the case is continued. (Case law reviewed)
- The moving party (the party requesting the continuance) has exercised due diligence (issued a subpoena) to secure the evidence or witness.

=== Absence or incapacitation of counsel ===
To obtain a continuance on the basis of absence of counsel in a criminal trial, the defendant must show that the absence was attributable to some unforeseeable cause.

When the absence of counsel is caused by an act or omission of the defendant, a continuance may be properly denied.

The Supreme Court of the United States will not postpone argument for the purpose of giving a famous counsel an opportunity to appear for a party adequately represented by other able counsel.

Discretion for the criminal trial court to grant or deny a continuance is ultimately limited and defined by the Sixth Amendment to the United States Constitution and the Fourteenth Amendment of the United States Constitution. These include the right to have effective counsel. Case law discussed.

A legitimate difference of opinion in trial tactics between the defendant and counsel (lawyer) can be a reason for dismissing the lawyer in a criminal case, and the seeking of a continuance.

A continuance may be granted if the counsel is legitimately engaged in another professional proceeding.

=== Surprise ===
A continuance may be granted in a criminal case where matters arise that could not have been reasonably anticipated. A continuance should be granted where depositions with information tending to create an alibi for the accused had been suppressed.

If the defendant has been deceived by the state in a criminal action, a continuance can be granted.

A continuance can be granted if there is an amendment to the indictment or introduction of new information in the criminal complaint.

A continuance may be granted because unexpected evidence or testimony has emerged. This includes additional witnesses not named in the original indictment, or unanticipated testimony of witnesses, such as major differences of fact from deposition and trial. Minor differences in testimony do not constitute surprise.

=== Other grounds ===
In some cases, the denial of a continuance to allow for adequate trial preparation may constitute grounds for an allegation of denial of effective assistance of counsel as required by the Sixth Amendment. The propriety of the trial court's refusal of a continuance sought on the ground of a want of time for a preparation of the defense of a criminal case depends on the facts and circumstances of the individual case.

A conviction may be reversed if, in the discretion of the court, the accused was not given an adequate time to prepare a defense, and this was material in depriving the accused of a fair trial.

A criminal prosecution may be continued if the defendant is too ill to attend the trial. In cases where there is little hope that the accused's health will ever improve, and continuance can properly be denied. Notable is a case of an 80-year-old man who had many delays due to a chronic medical condition. In his trial, the judge ruled there was little hope he would ever be in a better condition, and denied the continuance.

There has been opposite opinion where a continuance was allowed, and any question of a prospective improvement in the defendant was not the test and irrelevant.

A continuance is proper when the accused is unable to assist counsel because of mental illness.

== Civil cases ==
The absence of counsel is a recognized ground for continuance of a civil case and is in the discretion of the court to grant or deny.

Illness, death or withdrawal of counsel in civil cases are also reasons for granting a continuance.

=== Absence of witness or evidence ===
A civil case may be continued due to a lack of evidence or witnesses. An affidavit is usually required to explain the issues involved in the request for a continuance. An affidavit for continuance that did not state the name and address of an absent witness and what the defendant expected to prove by his testimony failed to comply with the requirements of the statute, and denial thereof was not an abuse of the trial court's discretion.

If all the requirements of an application for a continuance are met and described in the affidavit submitted to the court, and it is not being done for purposes of delay, it may be an abuse of discretion to deny a continuance.

To justify a continuance of a civil case due to the absence of evidence, the missing evidence must be shown to have relevance to the case.

The missing evidence must be material to some issue in the case.

Generally, in a civil case, a continuance sought due to absence of evidence will not be granted unless reasonable diligence has been used to procure it. The question of diligence is a matter of fact, addressed to the sound discretion of the court.

In some jurisdictions, the issuance of a subpoena is evidence of due diligence.

In many jurisdictions the service of a subpoena by itself, is insufficient to entitle a party to a continuance because of the absence of a witness.

To demonstrate the absence of material evidence in the form of papers, documents and the like, it is usually necessary to show that a subpoena duces tecum has been issued.

A continuance in a civil case can be granted because of the death or illness of a party to the action.

=== Absence or incapacity of counsel ===
The absence of counsel is a recognized ground for continuance of a civil case.

A court is not required to grant a postponement merely because a party's attorney is absent.

The court may require that the party seeking the continuance to show the reasons that the counsel is absent.

=== Absence of party ===
The absence of a party may be grounds for a continuance of a civil case. Factors considered legitimate in an absence are illness or disability.

It must be determined by the court whether the absence of a party or witness is material to the case, and whether there have been prior continuances or delays.

Absence because of voluntary intoxication is not a proper reason to continue a civil case. Absence because of mental illness may or may not be a legitimate reason for a continuance of a civil trial.

=== Surprise ===
A party may have a good ground for a continuance of a civil case when through no fault of their own, it is taken by surprise by the conduct of its adversary and would be unjustly prejudiced if forced to proceed without being given an opportunity to prepare to meet the new situation.

Surprises include an amendment or substitution of pleadings. Lack of time to prepare for a new complaint is a reason for a continuance. If the amendment requires the production of new evidence, a continuance may be granted.

=== Other grounds ===
A continuance may be granted because more time is needed to prepare for trial.

Where a defendant in a civil proceeding is entitled to have interested persons joined as parties (added to the list of plaintiffs or defendants in the case), and it is shown at the trial that those persons have not been included in the petition, he is entitled to a postponement of the trial until they can be joined. A civil case may be continued to allow proper service to another party. A pending, intervening proceeding may be the legitimate reason for a continuance.

== Procedure ==
=== Application for a continuance ===
Applications for continuance usually must be in writing and given to both the court and the opposing party (other litigants). The Federal Rules of Civil Procedure confers on federal district courts the authority to make local practice and procedure rules. In general, written requests are required. Failure in this will lead to a refusal for a continuance.

Affidavits outlining the reasons for application of a continuance are usually required to accompany the written request.

=== Hearing and order for a continuance ===
A hearing may be held on the issue of the propriety of an application for a continuance. However, there is no absolute requirement that a formal hearing in the matter of a continuance. It is reversible error to deny a continuance because the trial court thought the defendant was malingering. This occurred when the court came to a conclusion outside the facts presented at trial, and were contradictory to a physician's testimony that it was unsafe for the defendant to appear.

A continuance is a judicial act and takes a judicial act to overturn it.

It is within the discretion of the court to assign and impose costs for a continuance in a civil case. Extensive case law reviewed. As a condition to granting a continuance, a court may require a plaintiff to a file a bond securing a payment of all court costs incurred.

== See also ==
- Barker v. Wingo
- Change of venue
- Due process
- Fourteenth Amendment of the United States Constitution
- Powell v. Alabama
- Sheppard v. Maxwell
- Sixth Amendment to the United States Constitution
- Subpoena ad testificandum
- Subpoena duces tecum

https://doi.org/10.5281/zenodo.22121648
