= Peter Klopfer =

German-American zoologist (1930–2026)

Peter H. Klopfer
- Born: Peter Hubert Klopfer; August 9, 1930; Berlin, Brandenburg, Prussia, Germany
- Died: June 5, 2026 (aged 95)
- Education: University of California at Los Angeles; Yale University
- Known for: Ethology; Research on lemurs
- Scientific career
- Fields: Zoology
- Workplaces: Duke University
- Thesis: An Analysis of Learning in Young Anatidae (1957)

Peter Hubert Klopfer (August 9, 1930 – June 5, 2026) was a German-born American zoologist, civil rights advocate and educator. He was Professor Emeritus of Biology at Duke University, where in 1966 he co-founded, with John Buettner-Janusch, the Duke Lemur Center (formerly Duke Primate Center). This facility houses the largest living collection of endangered primates in the world.

Klopfer was an Elected Fellow of the American Association for the Advancement of Science (1963) and the Animal Behavior Society (1968). In 1979–80 he received the Humboldt Research Award for his achievements in the field of Sensory and Behavioral Biology.

As a scientist Klopfer authored, co-authored or edited twenty-five volumes and more than 125 peer-reviewed articles, most in the field of animal behavior. Among other contributions, Klopfer's research helped to establish the link between oxytocin and maternal attachment behavior and to initiate study of neural processes involved in hibernation among primates.

As a civil rights advocate Klopfer was jailed in 1964 for protesting segregated restaurant facilities in Orange County, North Carolina, including Watts Restaurant and Grill. He subsequently became the plaintiff in the 1967 United States Supreme Court case, Klopfer v. North Carolina, which upheld that the Speedy Trial Clause of the Sixth Amendment to the United States Constitution applies to individual states in the same way as it does to the federal government.

As an educator Klopfer and his wife, Martha Smith Klopfer, were among the Quakers who founded Carolina Friends School in 1962. CFS was one of the first schools in the modern South that welcomed children of all races.

== Life and career ==
=== Early life and education ===
Peter Hubert Klopfer was born on August 9, 1930, the elder of two sons born to German immigrant parents, Hubert Robert Klopfer (1900–1937) and Edith Brauer (1896–1977). Shortly after the end of World War I, Hubert Klopfer studied economics at Columbia University. There, in the 1940s (and later at UCLA), his brother, Bruno Klopfer, taught psychology and popularized use in the U. S. of the Rorschach test.

He was raised in the suburbs of Philadelphia and attended Abington Friends School. When his father became ill with Hodgkin lymphoma, young Peter lived for several years with Alice and Thomas Knight, Hicksite Quaker elders in Wyncote, Pennsylvania, who were close friends of his father. Late in 1937, after Hubert Klopfer's death, the brothers and their mother settled in southern California. Edith Brauer supported her family by taking in boarders, chiefly older German women with connections to the film industry.

As a teenager Klopfer attended Windsor Mountain School, an international boarding school in Lenox, Massachusetts, before matriculating at the University of California, Los Angeles, from which he earned a B.A. (with honors) in Biology in 1952. Here Klopfer was especially inspired by the "personal but unassuming" pedagogical style and "wide-ranging studies" of George A. Bartholomew. While an undergraduate at UCLA Klopfer's Quaker convictions led him to refuse conscription for military service during the Korean War. Returning his draft card resulted in a prison sentence; however, Judge Leon Yankwich, then Chief Judge of the United States District Court for the Southern District of California, released Klopfer on probation, on condition that he "obey all laws, State and Federal, so far as…conscience allows." Klopfer proceeded to join a technical assistance training program (forerunner of the Peace Corps) that was based at Haverford College.

At Haverford Klopfer came to know the herpetologist, Emmett Reid Dunn, who advanced the rigor of the young scientist's interest in animal behavior. While at Haverford Klopfer also discovered the work of Niko Tinbergen, in particular Tinbergen's 1952 paper, "Derived Activities: Their Causation, Biological Significance, Origin, and Emancipation during Evolution". Around the same time Klopfer became acquainted with the work of Eckhard Hess and his associate, A.O. Ramsay. Ramsay, who was both a researcher and a high school science teacher, offered a vocational model that Klopfer briefly followed (1952–53) when he returned to his former high school, Windsor Mountain School, as a science teacher.

Through volunteering at an American Friends Service Committee weekend work camp in Claremont, California, Peter Klopfer became acquainted with Martha Smith. Friendship grew into engagement, and they married in 1955. Through more than six decades the couple collaborated in many ways: as researchers, as founders of Carolina Friends School, as active members of Durham Monthly Meeting of Friends (NC) and board members of other Quaker organizations, as Masters runners, as equestrians, and as participants in Ride and Tie competitions. Peter and Martha Klopfer had three daughters and four grandchildren. Since 1958 the Klopfers made their home in North Carolina, residing nearly all that time in Orange County, on land that now accommodates Carolina Friends School, located 5 miles from the Duke Lemur Center and 6 miles from Duke University's Biological Sciences Building.

Klopfer did his Ph.D. work at the Osborn Memorial Labs of Yale University, drawn there by the recommendation of George Bartholomew and the charisma of G. Evelyn Hutchinson and Frank A. Beach. Here Klopfer came to know a variety of faculty members and guest lecturers, including J.P. Trinkaus, Dillon Ripley, Don Griffin, José Delgado, Konrad Lorenz and Margaret Mead. His cohort of graduate students at Yale included Malcolm S. Gordon, Alan J. Kohn, Daniel A. Livingstone, Robert H. MacArthur, and Jane Van Zandt Brower. Klopfer's Ph.D. thesis studied imprinting in waterfowl; however, his interest in maternal attachment in goats also dates to these years.

After a brief stint as head of the science department at Windsor Mountain School (1956), Klopfer's next stop in his formation as a scientist was a year (1957–58) as a postdoctoral fellow at W.H. Thorpe's Madingley Field Station for Animal Behaviour in Cambridge, England. In addition to Thorpe, Klopfer associated at Cambridge with Robert Hinde, Thelma Rowell, Malcolm Gordon, and Stephen Wainwright. Klopfer and Wainwright later became longtime colleagues at Duke University.

=== Academic career ===
Klopfer's career in higher education began in 1958, when he accepted a position as Assistant Professor in Duke University's Department of Zoology. Apart from four Visiting Professor positions in German and Israeli universities, Klopfer has spent his entire career at Duke University. He attained the rank of Associate Professor in 1963 and Professor in 1967. He was Professor Emeritus of Biology.

He held a variety of professional offices at Duke, including service on the Undergraduate Faculty Council (1959–64; 1988–89), the Neurosciences Curriculum Committee (1965–66), the Animal Care Committee (1966–68), the Academic Council (1967–71), and the Institutional Animal Care and Use Committee (1997–2018). He was Duke's representative to the Board of Directors for the Organization for Tropical Studies (1967–82), Secretary of Duke's American Association of University Professors chapter (1967–69), and Director of its Field Station for Animal Behavior Studies (1968–73).

An additional arena of Klopfer's service to Duke University was as its women's track coach, before Title IX (1972), when the team was a club (but did compete in ACC cross country meets). Klopfer was trained for this work by Duke's legendary and long-serving track coach, Al Buehler. Buehler also inspired Klopfer himself to become a Master's runner, a pursuit that he and his wife, Martha Klopfer, participated in for decades. In the 1970s Peter and Martha Klopfer were among the founding members of the Carolina Godiva Track Club.

In addition to his election to the AAAS, the Animal Behavior Society, and his Humboldt Award, other fellowships, awards, and honors Klopfer has received include a U.S. Public Health Service Special Postdoctoral Fellowship (1964), a Career Development Award from the National Institute of Mental Health (1965–70), the Duke University Student Association's "Outstanding Professor" Award (1968), and the "Distinguished Service Award" of the Cook Society, Duke University Office on Institutional Equity (2009). Klopfer was also named a "Distinguished Professor" by the UNCF (formerly the United Negro College Fund) in 1985–86.

During his academic career Klopfer held a variety of editorial positions with academic journals, including as associate editor, Journal of Experimental Zoology (1970–76), Editorial Advisor, Springer Verlag (1970–1990), and co-editor of the Plenum Press series, Perspectives in Ethology (1970–1990). Klopfer served as an editorial board member for The American Naturalist (1972–76) and the International Journal of Comparative Psychology (1995–2000).

Klopfer traveled widely as an academic research scientist. He was a Visiting Professor in Israel at Tel Aviv University (1970) and Hebrew University of Jerusalem (1987), and in Germany at the universities of Tübingen (1979–80) and Potsdam (1992). In Budapest, Hungary, he gave the Inaugural Lectures at Bolyai College of Eötvös Loránd University (1995).

Lemurs, both in Madagascar and at the Duke Lemur Center, were a focus of Klopfer's research. A personal interview with Klopfer in August 2020 yielded the following list of previous animals and habitat locations he studied: ducks in Manitoba; ducks and passerine birds in England; elephant seals in California; antelope in Israel, Jordan and Egypt; fish in Germany and Belize; horses on the Outer Banks of North Carolina; goats and giant tortoises on Aldabra; birds in Costa Rica, Panama, Guatemala, Jamaica, Cayman Brac and Puerto Rico; birds, ducks, goats and lemurs in North Carolina.

=== Activism and advocacy ===
Klopfer compiled a life-long record of activism and advocacy with respect to civil liberties and civil rights. That record was rooted in his membership in the Religious Society of Friends (Quakers), which dated to his youth and is briefly discussed above. It continued with the American Friends Service Committee, on whose Southwestern Region Executive Committee Klopfer served (1967–74; 2003–10). Perhaps the fullest manifestation of Peter (and Martha) Klopfer's Quaker commitments is the founding of Carolina Friends School (CFS) as a racially integrated school. The couple were not only founding and sustaining board members of CFS; they taught at it, raised funds for it, donated the land for it, sent their three daughters to it, and have provided continuous servant leadership to it for six decades.

While a young professor at Duke, Klopfer chose to take an active role in the civil rights movement that swept across the American South from 1954–1968. Indeed, just days after arriving in Durham, North Carolina (from Cambridge, England, in 1958), Peter and Martha Klopfer behaved, at a segregated laundromat, in a manner that confounded both its black and its white patrons. They put their dark-colored laundry in machines designated "colored" and their light-colored laundry in ones designated "white."

As an extension of his Quaker pacifism Klopfer, when a young adult, had joined the American Civil Liberties Union, the Fellowship of Reconciliation and the Congress of Racial Equality (CORE). He supported non-violent sit-ins to segregate public accommodations that began in Durham and Orange Counties in 1960. As documented in detail by Daniel H. Pollitt in a 1965 article published in the North Carolina Law Review 43 (689–767), the national profile of this movement for justice became especially pronounced in early 1964. On January 3, 1964, Peter Klopfer was one of six professors (four from Duke and two from UNC-Chapel Hill) who were arrested as part of a multi-racial group that met to request service at Watts Motel and Restaurant in southern Chapel Hill. Before they could enter "Watts Grill," the would-be protestors were "jumped on in the parking lot and beaten" Local police intervened in the bloodshed only after one of the UNC professors, Albert Halstead Amon, received serious head injuries.

On February 24, 1964, Klopfer was indicted for the misdemeanor crime of criminal trespass by an Orange County grand jury. North Carolina Superior Court Judge Raymond B. Mallard presided over Klopfer's initial trials. A string of hung juries and legal appeals—some of them focused on Klopfer's refusal, as a Quaker, to swear on the Bible—ultimately led Klopfer, his attorney Wade H. Penny, and the American Civili Liberties Union to assert, first to the North Carolina Supreme Court and then to the United States Supreme Court, that Klopfer's Sixth Amendment right to a speedy trial had been abridged. Ultimately, the U.S. Supreme Court voted by a margin of 6-3 to accept the case, which was argued on December 8, 1966, and decided unanimously in Klopfer's favor on March 13, 1967. Chief Justice Earl Warren wrote the opinion.

Ten years later, when Peter Klopfer was a member of the Carolina Friends School board of directors, the school filed an amicus curiae brief in another legal case, arguing for repeal of legislation passed by the state of North Carolina in 1977 that required non-public schools to administer standardized tests. Don Wells, Carolina Friends School principal at that time, asserted in sworn testimony that a "standardized equivalent measure" of student success, which Carolina Friends School employed, was the Quaker process of "consensus," which those in the judicial system should know well since it is what juries use "to decide, at times, matters of life and death." Surely this same process should be "suitable for use in measuring student progress," the school's argument concluded. Ultimately the North Carolina legislature concurred with this view. In 1979 "the General Assembly amended Chapter 115 of the General Statutes to include two new articles, Articles 32A and 32B, both of which have the effect of limiting the authority of the State Board of Education to regulate the educational programs of nonpublic schools providing instruction to children of compulsory attendance age."

=== Death ===
Klopfer died on June 5, 2026, at the age of 95.

== Major publications ==
(not including abstracts or book reviews)

=== Articles ===
- Klopfer, P.H., 1956, Comments concerning the age at which imprinting occurs. Wilson Bulletin, 68(4):320-321.
- Klopfer, P.H., 1956, Goose behavior by a White Leghorn chick. Wilson Bulletin, 68(1):68-69.
- Klopfer, P.H., 1957, An experiment on emphathic learning in ducks. American Naturalist 91:61-63.
- Klopfer, P.H., 1958, Influence of social interactions on learning rates in birds. Science, 128:903.
- Klopfer, P.H. and R. Macarthur, 1958, North American birds staying on board during Atlantic crossing. British Birds, 51:358.
- Klopfer, P.H., 1959, Environmental determinants of faunal diversity. The American Naturalist, 93:337-342.
- Klopfer, P.H., 1959, An analysis of learning in young anatidae. Ecology, 40(1):90-102.
- Klopfer, P.H., 1959, The development of sound-signal preferences in ducks. Wilson Bulletin, 71(3):262-266.
- Klopfer, P.H., 1959, Social interactions in discrimination learning with special reference to feeding behavior in birds. Behaviour, 14(4):282-299.
- Klopfer, P.H., and R.H. MacArthur, 1960, Niche size and faunal diversity. American Naturalist, 94:193-200.
- Klopfer, P.H. and R.H. MacArthur, 1961, On the causes of tropical species diversity: Niche Overlap. American Naturalist, 95:222-226.
- Welch, B.L. and P.H. Klopfer, 1961, Endocrine variability as a factor in the regulation of population density. American Naturalist, 95:256-260.
- Klopfer, P.H., 1961, Observational learning in birds: The establishment of behavioral modes. Behaviour, 97:71-80.
- Gottlieb, G. and P.H. Klopfer, 1962, The relation of developmental age to auditory and visual imprinting. J. Comp. and Physiol. Psych., 55:821-826.
- Klopfer, P.H. and J.P. Hailman, 1962, On measuring "Critical Learning Periods" in birds. Animal Behavior, 10:233- 234.
- Klopfer, P.H. and G. Gottlieb, 1962, Imprinting and behaviour polymorphism: Auditory and visual imprinting in domestic ducks and the involvement of the critical period. J. Comp. and Physiol. Psych., 55:126-130.
- Klopfer, P.H. and G. Gottlieb, 1962, Learning ability and behavioral polymorphism within individual clutches of wild ducklings. Zietschrift für Tierpsychologie, 19:183- 190.
- Klopfer, P.H. and M.S. Klopfer, 1962, Notes on handrearing Fallow deer, Dama dama. International Zoo Yearbook, 4:295-296.
- Klopfer, P.H., 1963, Behavioral aspects of habitat selection: The role of early experience. Wilson Bulletin, 75:15-22.
- Klopfer, P.H., 1964, Parameters of imprinting. American Naturalist, 98:175-182.
- Klopfer, P.H. and J.P. Hailman, 1964, Parameters of imprinting in Birds. Zeitschrift f_r Tierpsychologie, 21:755-762.
- Klopfer, P.H., 1964, Imprinting and the critical period. Research Problems in Biology, Series 3:96-98.
- Klopfer, P.H., D.K. Adams and M.S. Klopfer, 1964, Maternal imprinting in goats. Proceedings Nat. Acad. Sci., 52:911-914.
- Klopfer, P.H. and J.P. Hailman, 1964, Perceptual preferences and imprinting in chicks. Science, 145:1333-1334.
- Klopfer, P.H. and J.P. Hailman, 1965, Habitat selection in birds. In: Advances in the Study of Behavior. Lehrman Hinde and Shaw, eds., 19:279-303.
- Klopfer, P.H., 1965, Imprinting: A reassessment. Science, 147:302-303.
- Klopfer, P.H., 1965, Behavioral aspects of habitat selection: A preliminary report on stereotypy in foliage preferences of birds. Wilson Bulletin, 77:376-381.
- Klopfer, P.H. and B.K. Gilbert, 1966, A note on retrieval and recognition of young in the elephant seal, Mirounga angustirostris.. Zeitschrift fuer Tierpsych. 6: 23:757-760.
- Klopfer, P.H., and J. Gamble, 1967, Maternal "Imprinting" in Goats: The role of Chemical Senses. Zeitschrift für Tierpsychologie, 23:588-592.
- Klopfer, P.H., 1967, Is imprinting a cheshire cat? Behavioral Science, 12:122-129.
- Klopfer, P.H., 1967, Stimulus preferences and imprinting. Science, 156:1394-1396.
- Klopfer, P.H., 1967, Behavioral stereotypy in birds. Wilson Bulletin, 79:290-300.
- Klopfer, P.H., 1967, Men in Middle Life by K. Soddy & M. Kidson, based on a study by the Scientific Committee of the World Federation on Mental Health. Tavistock Publications, London.
- Klopfer, P.H. and P. Kilham, 1968 The construct "race" and the "innate differential". Columbia University Forum
- Klopfer, P.H. and P. Kilham, 1968, The construct "race" and the "innate differential". Science and the Concept of Race. M. Mead, et al., eds., Columbia University Press, pp. 16–25.
- Klopfer, P.H. and J.J. Hatch, 1968, Some experimental approaches to the study of animal communication. In: Animal Communication. T. Sebeok, ed., Indiana University Press.
- Klopfer, P.H., 1968, Laboratory studies of imprinting and social experience. In: Laboratory Studies of Animal Behavior. Allen W. Stokes, ed., Freeman Press.
- Klopfer, P.H., 1968, From Ardrey to altruism. Behavioral Science, 13:399-402.
- Klopfer, P.H., D.H. Sheppard and H. Oelke, 1968, Habitat selection: differences in stereotypy between insular and continental birds. Wilson Bulletin, 80:452-457.
- Kilham, P., P.H. Klopfer and H. Oelke, 1968, Species identification and color preferences in chicks. Animal Behavior, 16:238-245.
- Klopfer, P.H. and M.S. Klopfer, 1968, Maternal "imprinting" in goats: fostering of alien young. Zietschrift für Tierpsychologie, 24:362-866.
- Klopfer, P.H., 1968, Is heart rate an indicator of imprinted preferences and affect? Developmental Psychobiology, 1:205-209.
- Klopfer, P.H., 1969, Stimulus preferences and discrimination in neonatal ducklings. Behaviour, 32:309-314.
- Neumann, C.P. and P.H. Klopfer, 1969, Cage size and discrimination tests in birds: a methodological caution. Behaviour, 34:132-137.
- Klopfer, P.H., 1969, Aggression and its evolution. Psychiatry and Social Science Review, 3:2-7.
- Klopfer, P.H., 1969, Instincts and chromosomes: what is an "innate" act. American Naturalist, 103:556-560.
- Klopfer, P.H., 1969, The cosmic deathwish: evolutionary origins of mortality. Duke University Council on Aging and Human Development. Proceedings of Seminars, 1965-1969:279-285.
- Klopfer, P.H. and A. Jolly, 1970, The stability of territorial boundaries in lemur troop. Folia Primatologica, 12:199-208.
- Klopfer, P.H., 1970, Sensory physiology and esthetics. American Scientist, 58 (No. 4):399-400.
- Klopfer, P.H., 1970, Discrimination of young in galagos. Folia Primatologica, 13:137-143.
- Klopfer, P.H. and M.S. Klopfer, 1970, Patterns of maternal care in three species of lemur. Zeitschrift f. Tierpsych., 27:984-996.
- Oelke, H. and P.H. Klopfer, 1970, Licht als Stimulations faktor in der Biotopwahl von Katzendrosseln (Dumetella carolinensis). J. f. Ornithol., 111:357-361.
- Klopfer, P.H., 1971, Imprinting: determining its perceptual basis in ducklings. Journal of Comparative and Physiol.Psych., 75:378-385.
- Klopfer, P.H., 1971, Mother love: what turns it on? American Scientist, 59:404-407.
- Klopfer, P.H., 1971, Language and the teacher. In: Methods in Teaching Biology. A. Barash, ed., Tel Aviv.
- Klopfer, P.H., 1972, Patterns of maternal care in three species of Lemur: II. effects of early separation. Zeitschrift f. Tierpsych., 30:277-296.
- Feldman, D. and P.H. Klopfer, 1972, Observational learning in lemurs. Zeitscrhift für Tierpsych., 30:297-304.
- Klopfer, P.H., H.R. Pulliam, B. Gilbert, D. and L. McDonald and G. Millikan, 1972, On the evolution of sociality with special reference to the grass-quit, Tiaris olivacea. Wilson Bulletin, 84:77-89.
- Klopfer, P.H., 1972, Why are men conscious? Ann. Conn. Acad. Sci., 44:151-159.
- Klopfer, P.H., 1973, Evolution and behavior. In: Perspectives in Animal Behavior. G. Bermant, ed., Scott, Foresman & Co., Illinois.
- Klopfer, P.H., R.Barnett and L. McGeorge, 1973, Maternal Care. Addison-Wesley, California (Monograph).
- Klopfer, P.H., 1973, Imprinting: monocular and binocular cues in object discrimination. Jour. Comp. Physiol. Psych., 84:482-487.
- Klopfer, P.H., 1973, Mother-young relations in Lemurs. In: Perspectives in Prosimian Biology. R.D. Martin, A.C. Walker, and G.A. Doyle, eds., Duckworth Publ., London.
- Klopfer, P.H., 1973, Does behavior evolve? Annals N.Y. Acad. Sci., 223:113-125.
- Klopfer, P.H., and M.S. Klopfer, 1974, How come leaders to their posts: How are social ranks and roles determined? Amer. Sci., 61:560-564.
- Klopfer, P.H., 1974, Patterns of maternal care in lemurs: III notes on individual differences. Zeitschrift für Tierpsych., 40:210-220.
- Rubenstein, D.I., R.D. Ridgely, R.J. Barnett and P.H. Klopfer, 1974, Migration and species diversity in the tropics. Proc. Nat. Acad. Sci., 71:339-340.
- Rhoad, K.D., J.W. Kalat and P.H. Klopfer, 1975, Aggressive displays of Betta splendens to various stimuli. Animal Learning & Behavior, 3:271-276.
- Klopfer, P.H., 1976, Evolution, Behavior, Language. In: Communication, Behavior, and Evolution. E. Simmel and M. Hahn, eds., Academic Press.
- Klopfer, P.H. and M.S. Klopfer, 1977, How come leaders to their posts: compensatory responses of mothers to impaired young. Animal Behavior, 25:288-291.
- Klopfer, P.H., 1977, Instinctive behavior patterns. In: Int. Encyc. of Neurology, Psychiatry, Psychoanalysis and Psychology. B.B. Wolman ed., Aesculapius Press.
- Fairchild, L., D. Rubenstein, S. Patti and P.H. Klopfer, 1977, A note on seasonal changes in feeding strategies of mixed and single species flocks, Ibis, 119:85-87.
- Klopfer, P.H., 1977, Social Darwinism lives: should it? Yale J. Biol. & Med., 50:77-84.
- Rubenstein, D.I., R.J. Barnett, R.S. Ridgely and P.H. Klopfer, 1977, Feeding ecology of Mixed Species Flocks. ibis, 119:10-21.
- Klopfer, P.H. and D.I. Rubenstein, 1977, The concept "privacy" and its biological basis. J. of Social Issues, 33:52-65.
- Klopfer, P.H., 1977, Communication in prosimians. In: How Animals Communicate. T. Sebeok ed., Indiana University Press, pp. 841–850.
- Klopfer, P.H., 1978, Eco-Ethology: The adaptive value of behavior. Animal Behavior. K. Immelmann, ed., Kindler Publ., Munich.
- Klopfer, P.H. and K. Boskoff, 1979, Maternal behavior in prosimians. In: The Study of Prosimian Behavior. G.A. Doyle and R.D. Martin, eds., Academic Press. pp. 123–156.
- Klopfer, P.H., D. Gubernick and C. Jones, 1979, Maternal imprinting in goats: a failure to replicate? Animal Behav., 27:314-315.
- Klopfer, P.H., 1979, Imprinting ducklings: variability in individuals and responses. Behavioral Processes., 3:293-303.
- Klopfer, P.H., 1979, On human ethology. Behavioral and Brain Science pp. 39–40.
- Klopfer, P.H., 1980, Species Identity. In: Species Identification. A. Roy, ed., Garland Publ., pp. 355–360.
- Klopfer, P.H., 1980, A biographical note on Gregory Bateson. International Encyclopedia of the Social Sciences. Sills, D., ed., Macmillan, pp. 42–44.
- Klopfer, P.H., 1981, Islands as models. Bio. Sci., 31:838-839.
- Klopfer, P.H., 1981, The Naked Ape Reclothed. Am. J.Primatol., 1:301-305.
- Klopfer, P.H., 1981, Origins of parental care. In: Parental Care. D. Gubernick and P. Klopfer, eds., Plenum Press, New York 1-12.
- Klopfer, P.H., 1981, The evolution of aggression. In: The Biology of Aggression, P. Brain and D. Denton, eds., Nijhoff., Netherlands 3-15.
- Klopfer, P.H., M. Klopfer and J. Etemad, 1981, Girls and horses: a sex difference in attachments J. Elisha Mitchell Soc. 97:1-8.
- Klopfer, P.H., and L. Klopfer, 1982, On "Human Ethology". Semiotica. 39: 175-185
- Klopfer, P.H., 1982, Mating types and human sexuality. BioSci. 32:803-806.
- Klopfer, P.H. and J. Polemics, 1984. Three paradigms on the relation of science to society. Southeastern Atlantic Quarterly. 83:405-415.
- Klopfer, P.H., 1985, Central Controls for aggression. In: Perspectives in Ethology VI, Bateson and Klopfer, eds. Plenum Press. 33-44.
- Klopfer, P.H., and J. Ganzhorn, 1985, Behavioral aspects of habitat selection in Habitat Selection in Birds, Cody, ed. Academic Press.
- Klopfer, P.H., J. Parrish and C. Brandt, Imprinting and interactive influences, 1987, Int. J. Compar. Psych. 1:50-57.
- Klopfer, P.H., 1988, Reseeding The Commons, Schneirla Conference Proceedings. Erlbaum.
- Klopfer, P.H., C. Brandt, J. Parrish, and E. Honoré, 1986, Imprinting: annual cycles, in Behavioral Processes, 12:203-204.
- Klopfer, P.H., 1988, Metaphors for development: how important are experiences early in life? Developmental Psychobiology, 21:671-678.
- Klopfer, P.H. and J. Polemics (pseudonym), 1988, Is sociobiology Darwinistic? J. Elisha Mitchell Sci. Soc. (N.C. Acad Sci.) 104:619-27.
- Klopfer, P.H., A biography of Margaret Mead, 1988, Int. Encyclopedia of Communication, Oxford U. Press.
- Klopfer, P.H., A biography of Gregory Bateson, 1988, Int. Encyclopedia of Communication, Oxford U. Press.
- Klopfer, P.H., and J. Polemics, 1989, Have animals rights?, J. Elisha Mitchell Soc. (N.C. Acad. Sci.) 104:99-107.
- Klopfer, P.H. and N. Budnitz, 1990, Fixed Action Patterns and neural Darwinism. J. of Ornithol. 131:97-99.
- Klopfer, P.H., and J. Polemics, 1991, The development of aggression in children: a review. J. Elisha Mitchel, J. (NC Acad. Sci) 105:115-131.
- Klopfer, P.H. and J. Polemics, 1992, On the emergence of goodness. J. Elisha Mitchell Soc. (N.C. Acad. Sci.) 108:81-88.
- Klopfer, P.H., 1992, Structure and function in the CNS. Behav. Brain Sci. 15:281-282.
- Klopfer, P.H. and J. Polemics, 1993, Old wine in new bottles: another look at "instinct". J. Elisha Mitchell (N.C. Acad. Sci), 109:77-86.
- Klopfer, P.H., 1993, Ethology and noninvasive techniques. pg. 103-112 In Kapsis, M., and S. Gad-ed. Non-Animal Techniques in Biomedical and Behavior Research and Testing. Lewis Pubs.
- Klopfer, P.H., 1994, Konrad Lorenz and the National Socialists: on the politics of ethology. Int. J. Comp. Psych. 7:202-208.
- Klopfer, P.H. and J. Polemics, 1994, The postmodernist critique of science: is it useful? J. Elisha Mitchell (N.C. Acad. Sci) 110:113-120.
- Klopfer, P.H., 1996, Mother-young attachments: on the use of animal models. Amer. Sci. 84:319-321.
- Klopfer, P.H. and J. Podos, 1998, Behavioral Ecology. Encyclopedia of Comparative Psychology, G. Greenberg and M. Haraway, eds. pp. 81–87. Garland Pub. Co., NY
- Conklin, H. and J. Polemics, 1997, Brain dimorphisms and sex: a review. Int. J. Comp. Psych. 10:25-56
- Klopfer, P.H., 2001, Parental care and development. in, Cycles of Contingency, S. Oyama, P.Griffiths, R. Gray, eds.pp 167–174 M.I.T. Press, Cambridge, Ma.
- Klopfer, P.H., 2000, A Biography of G.E.Hutchinson. in, Encyclopedia of Global Environmental Change, T.Munn, ed. J.Wiley and Sons, London.
- Sax, B. and Klopfer, P.H., 2001, Jakob von Uexkuell and the Anticipation of Sociobiology, in Jakob von Uexkuell: a paradigm for biology and semiotics, Kalevi Kull, ed., Semiotica 131-1/4:767-778. Mouton de Gruyter, Berlin, N.Y.
- Klopfer, P. and J.Polemics, 2002. The state of ethology, Animal Behavior Soc. Newsletter 47 (3):4-5
- Klopfer, P.H. 2005 Animal cognition and the new anthropomorphism. International Journal of Comparative Psychology, 18, 202-206.
- Kim, D. and J.Polemics, sub. for pub., Functions of play and animal adaptability
- Klopfer, P.H., A. Krystal, C.Williams, and A. Yoder, in press, Neuroethology: do hibernating lemurs sleep? in, Nova Acta Leopoldina, conference proceedings at Humboldt Univ., Berlin, FRD, May, 2009.
- Andrew D. Krystal, MD, MS1; Bobby Schopler, DVM, PhD2; Susanne Kobbe, PhD3; Cathy Williams, DVM2; Hajanirina Rakatondrainibe, DVM4; Anne Yoder, PhD2,5; Peter Klopfer, PhD2,5
- Discovery of a Novel REM Sleep-Like State in a Hibernating Primate - Cheirogaleus medius PLoS ONE 8(9): e69914. doi:10.1371/journal.pone.0069914
- The Relationship of Sleep with Temperature and Metabolic Rate in a Hibernating Primate Andrew D. Krystall*, Bobby Schopler2, Susanne Kobbe3, Cathy Williams2, Hajanirina Rakatondrainibe4, Anne D. Yoder2,5, Peter Klopfer2,6 rsos.royalsocietypublishing.org
- Blanco MB, Dausmann KH, Faherty SL, Klopfer P, Krystal AD, Schopler R, Yoder A. 2016 Hibernation in a primate: does sleep occur? R. Soc. open sci. 3: 160282. doi:10.1098/rsos.160282
- Faherty SL, Villanueva-Cañas JL, Klopfer PH, Albà MM, Yoder AD (2016) Gene expression profiling in the hibernating primate, Cheirogaleus medius. Genome Biol Evol 8:evw163
- Klopfer, P.H. 2018. Frank Beach, a biography. Encyclopedia of Animal Cognition and Behavior, Springer Verlag
- Klopfer, P.H. 2019. Imprinting. Encyclopedia of Animal Cognition and Behavior, Springer Verlag.
- Marina B. Blanco1,2, Lydia K. Greene1,2, Robert Schopler1, Cathy Williams1, Danielle Lynch1, Jenna Browning1, Kay Welser1, Melanie Simmons1, Peter H. Klopfer2, Erin E. Ehmke1 On the modulation and maintenance of hibernation in dwarf lemurs at the Duke Lemur Center, USA. (sub. for pub., 2020)
- Blanco MB, Greene LK, Klopfer PH, Lynch D, Browning J, Ehmke EE, Yoder AD Body mass and tail girth predict hibernation expression in captive dwarf lemurs Physiological and Biochemical Zoology, volume 95, number 2, March 2022. q 2021 The University of Chicago. All rights reserved. Published by The University of Chicago Press. doi:10.1086/718222
- Blanco MB, Greene LK, Ellsaesser L, Schopler B, Davison M, Ostrowski C, Klopfer PH, Fietz J, Ehmke EE.

Of fruits and fats: white adipose tissue profiles in captive dwarf lemurs are affected by diet and temperature. Proc. R. Soc.B 289:202259

- Blanco MB*1,2, Greene LK1,2, Klopfer PH2, Yoder AD2, Ehmke EE1, Lin J3, Smith DL3Telomere dynamics in captive dwarf lemurs resemble patterns of temperate hibernators. Sub for pub 2022

=== Books ===
- Klopfer, P.H., 1962, Behavioral Aspects of Ecology. Prentice-Hall, New Jersey.
- Klopfer, P.H. and J.P. Hailman, 1967, Introduction to Animal Behavior: Ethology's First Century. Prentice-Hall.
- Klopfer, P.H., 1969, Territories and Habitats: a study of the use of space by animals. Basic Books.
- Klopfer, P.H., 1970, Editor, Behavioral Ecology, Dickenson Publ.
- Klopfer, P.H. and J.P. Hailman, eds., 1972, Volume 1 - Function and Evolution of Behavior: an historical sample from the pens of ethologists. Addison-Wesley Publ., California.
- Klopfer, P.H. and J.P. Hailman, eds., 1972, Volume II - Control and Development of Behavior: an historical sample from the pens of ethologists. Addison-Wesley Publ., California.
- Klopfer, P.H., 1973, Behavioral Aspects of Ecology, 2nd edition. Prentice-Hall, New Jersey.
- Klopfer, P.H., 1973, Instinct is a Cheshire Cat: A Primer on Animal Behavior. J.B. Lipincott Company.
- Bateson, P.P.G. and P.H. Klopfer, eds., 1973, Perspectives in Ethology, Vol. I, Plenum Press, New York.
- Klopfer, P.H., 1974, An Introduction to Animal Behavior: Ethology's First Century. (Revision) Prentice-Hall.
- Bateson, P.P.G. and P.H. Klopfer, eds., 1977, Perspectives in Ethology, Vol. II, Plenum Press.
- Bateson, P.P.G. and P.H. Klopfer, eds., 1978, Perspectives in Ethology, Vol. III, Plenum Press.
- Gubernick, D. and P.H. Klopfer, eds., 1981, Parental Care in Mammals. Plenum Press, New York.
- Bateson, P.P.G. and P.H. Klopfer, eds., 1981, Perspectives in Ethology IV, Plenum Press.
- Bateson, P.P.G. and P.H. Klopfer, eds., 1982, Perspectives in Ethology V, Plenum Press.
- Bateson, P.P.G. and P.H. Klopfer, eds. 1985, Perspectives in Ethology VI, Plenum Press.
- Bateson, P.P.G. and P.H. Klopfer, eds. 1987, Perspectives in Ethology VII, Plenum Press.
- Klama, J. (Pseudonym) 1988, Aggression: conflict in animals and man, Longmans, London (with others).
- Klama, J. (Pseudonym) Aggression: the myth of the beast within, Wiley, NY. (with others).
- Bateson, P.P.G. & P.H. Klopfer eds., 1989, Perspectives in Ethology, VIII, Plenum Press.
- Bateson, P.P.G. & P.H. Klopfer eds., 1991, Perspectives in Ethology, IX, Plenum Press.
- Klopfer Honoré, E. and P.H. Klopfer, 1991, A Concise Survey of Animal Behavior, Academic Press.
- Klopfer, P.H., 1991, The Carolina Godiva Guide to Running. CFS Press.
- Bateson, P.P.G., P.H. Klopfer and N. Thompson, eds., 1993, Perspectives in Ethology, X, Plenum Press.
- Klopfer, P.H. 1999 Politics and People of Ethology: personal reflections on the study of animal behavior. Bucknell Univ. Press
- Honore, E. and P.H.Klopfer Darwin and the First Grandfather. Amazon
- Wing, G. and P. and M. Klopfer. Aldabra Journal. Amazon

=== Articles of public and social concerns ===
- 1966 Prayers of an electronic Saint. The Churchman, March 1966:6-8
- 1967 On the inevitability of altruism. The Churchman, Feb. 1967:9-10.
- 1968 George Fox and the Hippies. The Churchman, pp. 7–8.
- 1969 Anarchy and the C.O. The Churchman, June–July 1969:6-7.
- 1970 When the soldiers leave, will the dying stop? The longer term effects of biochemical weapons. Crossroads, 1:8-12.
- When the soldiers leave, will the dying stop? The longer term effects of biochemical weapons. The Churchman, April 1970:7-8.
- 1971 That tiger, aggression. Friends Journal, April:196-197.
- 1974 Reflections upon tax refusal. The Churchman, March:11.
- 1990 Angels on pins: animal rights and wrongs. Perspectives, Duke U.Medical Cntr., 10:1 et seq.
- 2004 Learning from Lemurs, in Encyclopedia of Animal Behavior, M. Bekoff and J.Goodall, eds. Greenwood Publishers
