= Zedner v. United States =

- Supreme Court of the United States

Argued April 18, 2006 Decided June 5, 2006
- Full case name: Jacob Zedner, Petitioner v. United States
- Docket no.: 05-5992
- Citations: 547 U.S. 489 (more) 126 S. Ct. 1976; 164 L. Ed. 2d 749; 2006 U.S. LEXIS 4509; 74 U.S.L.W. 4271; 46 A.L.R. Fed. 2d 649; 19 Fla. L. Weekly Fed. S 213

Holding
- A defendant cannot prospectively waive all protections of the Speedy Trial Act.

Court membership
- Chief Justice John Roberts Associate Justices John P. Stevens · Antonin Scalia; Anthony Kennedy · David Souter; Clarence Thomas · Ruth Bader Ginsburg; Stephen Breyer · Samuel Alito

Case opinions
- Majority: Alito, joined by Roberts, Stevens, Kennedy, Souter, Thomas, Ginsburg, Breyer; Scalia (all but Part III–A–2)
- Concurrence: Scalia (in part)

Laws applied
- Speedy Trial Act

Zedner v. United States, 547 U.S. 489 (2006), was a United States Supreme Court case concerning the right to a speedy trial in which the defendant's criminal trial took place more than 7 years after he was originally indicted. Justice Samuel Alito, writing for a unanimous Court, ruled that a defendant cannot prospectively waive the protections of the Speedy Trial Act. Justice Antonin Scalia filed a partial concurrence, objecting to Alito's use of legislative history.

== Background ==
Jacob Zedner was arrested in 1996 for attempting to open bank accounts at several financial institutions using a fake $10 million bond issued by the fictitious "Ministry of Finance of U.S.A." littered with obvious errors. Some of the errors included words like "Thunted States" (United States), "Cgicago" (Chicago), and "Dhtladelphla" (Philadelphia). He was indicted by a grand jury in the Eastern District of New York for trying to pass counterfeit Treasury securities on April 4, 1996. The District Court granted a continuance until September 6, then granted another continuance until November 8. Due to difficulties in arranging a trial schedule, the judge suggested that the defendant waive his rights under the Speedy Trial Act "for all time." The defendant and his attorney agreed to do so.

The case continued to languish for the next four years, during which time the defendant changed lawyers, was examined by a psychiatrist, and ultimately decided to proceed pro se. On March 7, 2001, while his competency to stand trial was being examined, the defendant moved to have the case dismissed for failure to comply with the Speedy Trial Act. The District Court denied his motion, and on April 7, 2003, the trial finally began.

=== Procedural history ===
On April 7, 2003, after a trial in the District Court, a jury found Zedner guilty and the judge sentenced him to 63 months imprisonment. The United States Court of Appeals for the Second Circuit upheld the verdict, including the waiver of speedy trial rights, and noted that any error was harmless. The Supreme Court granted certiorari to determine if the waiver was effective.

=== Issue ===
The Speedy Trial Act requires that a trial begin within seventy days of the indictment, but provides for a variety of exceptions. If the trial does not begin on time, the defendant may move for dismissal, which the court must (under most circumstances) grant.

=== Parties' arguments ===
The government contended that the defendant could waive his rights under the Act. The defendant did so, but then contended that such a waiver was unlawful. The issue had not been addressed in earlier cases.

== Opinion of the Court ==
The Court unanimously held that the defendant was correct; one may not prospectively waive one's rights under the Speedy Trial Act. Justice Alito wrote that the purpose of the Act is not simply to protect the defendant's rights, but to protect the public's interest in a speedy trial. For that reason, the Act excludes certain delays even at the request of the defendant.

Alito next discussed the legislative history of the Act; this is the section in which Justice Scalia declined to concur. The history follows the explicit terms of the Act, stating that the public has an interest in quick resolutions to criminal charges. Alito went on to discuss the lack of a provision for prospective waiver in the statute.

The Court then rejected the government's alternate theory of the case: that the defendant, having agreed to the waiver, is now estopped from challenging it. The Court declines to apply estoppel doctrines, stating that it would "entirely swallow the Act's no-waiver policy." Furthermore, the Court found, since the district court requested the waiver, rather than the defendant, estoppel is not applicable. In addition, the harmless error doctrine does not apply to speedy trial violations.

=== Concurrence ===
Justice Scalia concurred in everything except Part III-A-2, the section on legislative history.
