= Pennsylvania v. Finley =

- Supreme Court of the United States

Argued March 2, 1987 Decided May 18, 1987
- Full case name: Pennsylvania v. Finley
- Citations: 481 U.S. 551 (more) 107 S. Ct. 1990; 95 L. Ed. 2d 539

Case history
- Prior: Cert. to the Superior Court of Pennsylvania

Holding
- Anders v. California (1967) applies only to direct appeals, not collateral postconviction proceedings.

Court membership
- Chief Justice William Rehnquist Associate Justices William J. Brennan Jr. · Byron White; Thurgood Marshall · Harry Blackmun; Lewis F. Powell Jr. · John P. Stevens; Sandra Day O'Connor · Antonin Scalia

Case opinions
- Majority: Rehnquist, joined by White, Powell, O'Connor, Scalia
- Concurrence: Blackmun
- Dissent: Brennan, joined by Marshall
- Dissent: Stevens

Laws applied
- U.S. Const. amend. XIV

Pennsylvania v. Finley, 481 U.S. 551 (1987), was a United States Supreme Court case involving the right to counsel.

== See also ==
- List of United States Supreme Court cases, volume 476
- List of United States Supreme Court cases
- Lists of United States Supreme Court cases by volume
- List of United States Supreme Court cases by the Rehnquist Court
