= Speedy Trial Clause =

Clause in the Sixth Amendment of the United States Constitution

The Speedy Trial Clause of the Sixth Amendment to the United States Constitution provides, "In all criminal prosecutions, the accused shall enjoy the right to a speedy and public trial...". The Clause protects the defendant from delay between the presentation of the indictment or similar charging instrument and the beginning of trial.

== History ==
In Barker v. Wingo (1972), the Supreme Court developed a four-part test that considers the length of the delay, the reasons for the delay, the defendant's assertion of his right to a speedy trial, and the prejudice to the defendant. A violation of the Speedy Trial Clause is cause for dismissal with prejudice of a criminal case. Within these parameters, it was determined that the five-year wait for this case to go to trial was not in violation of the Constitution.

In 1974, Congress passed the Speedy Trial Act to help protect and clarify defendants' speedy trial rights.

== Speedy trial statutes ==
In addition to the constitutional guarantee, various state and federal statutes confer a more specific right to a speedy trial. All U.S. states have either statutes or constitutional provisions detailing this right. In New York, the prosecution must be "ready for trial" within six months on all felonies except murder, or the charges are dismissed by action of law without regard to the merits of the case. This is also known as a "ready rule".

The federal law detailing this right in federal actions is the Speedy Trial Act of 1974. In 1979 the Act was amended to ensure that the defendant had time to provide a suitable defense. This amendment made it so trial could not start within less than 30 days after the defendant first appeared in the court. In Zedner v. United States (2006) the Supreme Court determined that a defendant cannot waive his right to a speedy trial using the Speedy Trial Clause because the clause protects all parties involved in a case to ensure that no one's interests are being implicated.

== Speedy trial cases ==
- In Barker v. Wingo (1972), the Supreme Court required a case-by-case analysis of potential Speedy Trial violations, and laid out a four-factor balancing test for lower courts to make that determination.
- In Doggett v. United States (1992), the Supreme Court determined that Doggett's eight and a half year wait for a trial violated his sixth amendment rights.

== See also ==
- Speedy trial
- Justice delayed is justice denied
