= List of United States Supreme Court cases, volume 386 =

This is a list of all the United States Supreme Court cases from volume 386 of the United States Reports:

Case name	Citation	Date decided
Miller v. Pate	386 U.S. 1	1967
Fla. E. Coast R.R. Co. v. United States	386 U.S. 8	1967
D'Amico v. Pennsylvania	386 U.S. 8	1967
Woodington v. Wisconsin	386 U.S. 9	1967
Weiss v. Gardner	386 U.S. 9	1967
Fenster v. Leary	386 U.S. 10	1967
Risch v. Risch	386 U.S. 10	1967
Stoneham v. Texas	386 U.S. 11	1967
Beer v. Att'y Gen.	386 U.S. 11	1967
Milani v. Illinois	386 U.S. 12	1967
Dale v. California	386 U.S. 12	1967
Allison v. United States	386 U.S. 13	1967
Holmes v. Super. Ct.	386 U.S. 13	1967
Rundle v. Johnson	386 U.S. 14	1967
Zuckerman v. Greason	386 U.S. 15	1967
Barlow v. Texas	386 U.S. 16	1967
Kaye v. Co-ordinating Comm.	386 U.S. 17	1967
Chapman v. California	386 U.S. 18	1967
Cooper v. California	386 U.S. 58	1967
Giles v. Maryland	386 U.S. 66	1967
Kilgarlin v. Hill	386 U.S. 120	1967
MacDonald v. California	386 U.S. 127	1967
Kimbro v. Heer	386 U.S. 128	1967
Cascade Nat. Gas Corp. v. El Paso Nat. Gas Co.	386 U.S. 129	1967
Levin v. Miss. River Fuel Corp.	386 U.S. 162	1967
Vaca v. Sipes	386 U.S. 171	1967
Shell Oil Co. v. State Bd. of Equalization	386 U.S. 211	1967
Bogart v. Reagan	386 U.S. 211	1967
Phillips v. California	386 U.S. 212	1967
Klopfer v. North Carolina	386 U.S. 213	1967
FTC v. Jantzen, Inc.	386 U.S. 228	1967
FPC v. United Gas Pipe Line Co.	386 U.S. 237	1967
Swenson v. Bosler	386 U.S. 258	1967
Hester v. Swenson	386 U.S. 261	1967
Young v. U.S. Bd. of Parole	386 U.S. 261	1967
Alterman Transp. Lines, Inc. v. Pub. Serv. Comm'n	386 U.S. 262	1967
Hollis v. California	386 U.S. 262	1967
Ricks v. California	386 U.S. 263	1967
Fontaine v. California	386 U.S. 263	1967
Haendiges v. Ford	386 U.S. 264	1967
Anders v. California	386 U.S. 264	1967
Tettamble v. Missouri	386 U.S. 265	1967
Hudgins v. California	386 U.S. 265	1967
Ford v. California	386 U.S. 266	1967
Nielsen v. Neb. State Bar Ass'n	386 U.S. 266	1967
Wheaton v. California	386 U.S. 267	1967
Wackenhut Corp. v. Aponte	386 U.S. 268	1967
City of Galveston v. United States	386 U.S. 269	1967
Louisiana v. United States (1967)	386 U.S. 270	1967
Daugherty v. California	386 U.S. 271	1967
Garner v. California	386 U.S. 272	1967
Erb v. California	386 U.S. 273	1967
Cotter v. California	386 U.S. 274	1967
Propp v. California	386 U.S. 275	1967
Otwell v. California	386 U.S. 276	1967
Shaw v. California	386 U.S. 277	1967
Boyden v. California	386 U.S. 278	1967
Roy v. California	386 U.S. 279	1967
McClellan v. California	386 U.S. 280	1967
Davis v. California	386 U.S. 281	1967
Adams v. California	386 U.S. 282	1967
Michael v. California	386 U.S. 283	1967
Deckard v. Warden	386 U.S. 284	1967
Beattie v. California	386 U.S. 285	1967
Garrison v. California	386 U.S. 286	1967
Comm'r v. Stidger	386 U.S. 287	1967
McCray v. Illinois	386 U.S. 300	1967
Neely v. Martin K. Eby Constr. Co.	386 U.S. 317	1967
O'Brien v. United States	386 U.S. 345	1967
Gulf-Canal Lines, Inc. v. United States	386 U.S. 348	1967
New York v. United States (1967)	386 U.S. 349	1967
Arden Farms Co. v. State Dept. of Agric.	386 U.S. 350	1967
R.R. Transfer Serv., Inc. v. City of Chicago	386 U.S. 351	1967
United States v. First City Nat'l Bank	386 U.S. 361	1967
Balt. & Ohio R.R. Co. v. United States	386 U.S. 372	1967
Bostick v. South Carolina	386 U.S. 479	1967
Colonial Refrigerated Transp., Inc. v. United States	386 U.S. 480	1967
Rogers v. City of Denver	386 U.S. 480	1967
Berman v. N.Y.C. Bd. of Elections	386 U.S. 481	1967
Shannon v. Sequeechi	386 U.S. 481	1967
Cross v. Mun. Ct.	386 U.S. 482	1967
Mangus v. A.C.E. Freight, Inc.	386 U.S. 482	1967
Connor v. Johnson	386 U.S. 483	1967
Honda v. Clark	386 U.S. 484	1967
Crown Coat Front Co. v. United States	386 U.S. 503	1967
State Farm Fire & Cas. Co. v. Tashire	386 U.S. 523	1967
Nowakowski v. Maroney	386 U.S. 542	1967
D'Amico v. Balti. & Ohio R.R. Co.	386 U.S. 544	1967
Fla. E. Coast R.R. Co. v. United States	386 U.S. 544	1967
Cross v. California	386 U.S. 546	1967
Young v. Dir.	386 U.S. 546	1967
Pierson v. Ray	386 U.S. 547	1967
FTC v. Procter & Gamble Co.	386 U.S. 568	1967
Specht v. Patterson	386 U.S. 605	1967
National Woodwork Mfrs. Ass'n v. NLRB	386 U.S. 612	1967
Houston Insulation Contractors Ass'n. v. NLRB	386 U.S. 664	1967
Thorpe v. Housing Auth.	386 U.S. 670	1967
Laverne v. Laurel Hollow	386 U.S. 682	1967
Walker v. Arkansas	386 U.S. 682	1967
Stewart v. Indus. Comm'n	386 U.S. 683	1967
Dacey v. Grievance Comm.	386 U.S. 683	1967
Miller Brewing Co. v. Jones	386 U.S. 684	1967
Utah Pie Co. v. Cont'l Baking Co.	386 U.S. 685	1967
Clewis v. Texas	386 U.S. 707	1967
Prohibition Party v. Hare	386 U.S. 713	1967
Arnold v. Virginia	386 U.S. 713	1967
Fleischmann Distilling Corp. v. Maier Brewing Co.	386 U.S. 714	1967
The Lanham Act specifies available compensatory remedies, and they do not include attorney's fees; furthermore, attorney's fees are generally not recoverable without statutory or contractual provisions.
Waldron v. Moore-McCormack Lines, Inc.	386 U.S. 724	1967
Jackson v. Lykes Bros. S.S. Co.	386 U.S. 731	1967
Anders v. California	386 U.S. 738	1967
Entsminger v. Iowa	386 U.S. 748	1967
Nat'l Bellas Hess, Inc. v. Dept. of Revenue	386 U.S. 753	1967
Redrup v. New York	386 U.S. 767	1967
Turner v. New York	386 U.S. 773	1967
Oscar Gruss & Son v. United States	386 U.S. 776	1967
Armored Carrier Corp. v. United States	386 U.S. 778	1967
Fifth Ave. Coach Lines, Inc. v. City of New York	386 U.S. 778	1967
Callender v. New York	386 U.S. 779	1967
Laverne v. Piranesi Imports, Inc.	386 U.S. 779	1967
Montieth v. Oregon	386 U.S. 780	1967
