= Anders v. California =

- Supreme Court of the United States

Argued March 14, 1967 Decided May 8, 1967
- Full case name: Anders v. California
- Citations: 386 U.S. 738 (more) 87 S. Ct. 1396; 18 L. Ed. 2d 493; 1967 U.S. LEXIS 1569

Case history
- Prior: Cert. to the Supreme Court of California

Holding
- The failure to grant this indigent petitioner seeking initial review of his conviction the services of an advocate, as contrasted with an amicus curiae, which would have been available to an appellant with financial means, violated petitioner's rights to fair procedure and equality under the Fourteenth Amendment.

Court membership
- Chief Justice Earl Warren Associate Justices Hugo Black · William O. Douglas; Tom C. Clark · John M. Harlan II; William J. Brennan Jr. · Potter Stewart; Byron White · Abe Fortas

Case opinions
- Majority: Clark, joined by Warren, Douglas, Brennan, White, Fortas
- Dissent: Stewart, joined by Black, Harlan

Anders v. California, 386 U.S. 738 (1967), was a United States Supreme Court case in which a court-appointed attorney filed a motion to withdraw from the appeal of a criminal case because of his belief that any grounds for appeal were frivolous.

The Supreme Court ruled that any such motion must be accompanied by a brief (commonly referred to as an Anders brief) outlining the case and any potential (albeit possibly frivolous) grounds for appeal, that the appellate court must independently review the case, and that a defendant must be allowed the right to appeal either pro se or by other counsel.

== Background ==
The specific case involved a California defendant, Charlie Anders, who was convicted of felony possession of marijuana. Anders then requested that the California District Court of Appeal appoint appellate counsel for him, which was granted.

Anders' counsel, after review of the case and discussion with Anders, determined that no non-frivolous grounds for appeal existed, and notified the court by letter that counsel would not file an appeal, and that Anders wanted to file an appeal on his own behalf. The entire notification consisted of a single letter from Anders' counsel to the court stating that there was no merit to the appeal. Anders then requested that another attorney be appointed. That request was denied, whereupon Anders filed a pro se appeal which was not successful.

Six years later, Anders requested that his case be re-opened on the basis that he was denied the right to counsel. Both the California District Court of Appeal and the California Supreme Court ruled against Anders, whereupon Anders appealed to the Supreme Court which granted certiorari.

The U.S. Supreme Court held in the specific case that Anders was denied his Sixth Amendment right to counsel, as the bare assertion of lack of grounds for appeal by his counsel was not enough to constitute adequate representation. The Court ruled, however, that an attorney could still move to withdraw on the basis that no non-frivolous grounds for appeal exist, but that certain steps had to be taken before such a motion could be granted.

== Anders brief ==
In order to file an Anders brief (also called a "no-merits brief"), the attorney must do the following:

1. The attorney must file a motion to withdraw as the defendant's counsel.
2. The motion to withdraw must "be accompanied by a brief referring to anything in the record that might arguably support the appeal." Any and all grounds, even if counsel considers them frivolous, must be raised in the brief. Those grounds include areas such as whether or not a plea of guilty was made voluntarily and freely, or whether the sentence imposed by the court was within the permissible range.
3. The defendant should be given a copy of the brief and given time to raise any grounds (either pro se or by other counsel) that the defendant so chooses to raise.
4. The court must then independently "after a full examination of all the proceedings" decide if the appeal is wholly frivolous. If the court decides it is, then it is to grant counsel's motion to withdraw and then (depending on state law) either dismiss the appeal or rule on its merits, but must still allow the defendant to further appeal if desired. If the court, though, finds that there is at least one non-frivolous ground, it must then allow the defendant the right to make the case and appoint counsel if needed. (As part of an Anders brief, an attorney may request that, if the court finds a non-frivolous ground(s) for appeal, the attorney be allowed to withdraw the brief and remain as counsel, whereupon the attorney would then amend the appeal to argue on the ground(s) that the court has found.)

== Practical effect ==
The decision of whether or not to file an Anders brief is sometimes difficult for lawyers seeking to respect the ethical rules on frivolity while being zealous advocates for their clients.

The Oregon Court of Appeals noted an anomaly with the Anders decision: if counsel raises no grounds for appeal, then the court must review the entire record to determine if a ground for appeal may exist, but if counsel raises any ground (even only one), then the court is only required to review that portion of the record pertaining to the ground raised by counsel and is not required to review any portion related to other grounds not raised.

There is the possibility that an attorney may not see the merit in the error assigned by his or her client, and a client may have viable grounds for the client's claim. In State v. Williams, the Ohio Court of Appeals granted an attorney leave to withdraw, but found a potentially meritorious error and designated a different attorney to represent the defendant, noting pointedly that “an Anders brief is not a substitute for an appellate brief argued on the merits.”

There have been incidents where cases have been pressed through the courts after the attorney was granted withdrawal based on an Anders brief, and the defendant has gone on to prevail. The Court of Appeals of Ohio reversed a conviction in State v. Wilkinson, and in State v. Kerby the court determined that there was a potential issue as to the voluntariness of the confession, appointed new counsel to argue it, and ultimately threw out the defendant's conviction.

== States abandoning Anders ==
According to an article in the Florida State University Law Review, some states have abandoned the Anders procedure for other means to review appellate cases where the attorney claims no non-frivolous grounds.

For example, Idaho does not permit the attorney to withdraw from the case. The attorney, though, can still file an Anders brief (in terms of arguing that there are no non-frivolous grounds for appeal), but the courts do not then independently review the record for error, the argument being that Anders does not trigger the court to do so unless the attorney moves to withdraw, which Idaho has chosen not to permit. New Hampshire also does not permit withdrawal, but specifically exempts a potentially frivolous appeal from being subject to attorney sanctions.

North Dakota has taken a different approach: it allows an attorney to withdraw but then assigns a different attorney to the case so the defendant has counsel if desired.

California no longer requires the attorney to withdraw. Now she or he may submit a "Wende Brief", named after the case in which the procedure was approved.

== States expanding Anders ==
Though Anders itself applies only to criminal proceedings, at some states have expanded its holding to include other types of cases. The Arkansas Supreme Court has applied Anders to family law cases involving termination of parental rights and to adult protective custody cases, and by its own rules to juvenile delinquency and involuntary commitment cases. The Connecticut Supreme Court has similarly applied Anders where appellate counsel is appointed for indigent parents whose parental rights have been terminated.

Illinois also permits an Anders brief in any case where a party has a right to appointed counsel, including proceedings for involuntary commitment, juvenile abuse and neglect, or termination of parental rights. Furthermore, in Illinois, an Anders brief "must identify at least one potentially justiciable issue" on appeal and cannot argue that there are no grounds, even if frivolous or without merit, to support an appeal.

The South Carolina Supreme Court also expanded Anders to post-conviction relief proceedings, which the United States Supreme Court has held is not required.

== See also ==
- Pennsylvania v. Finley (1987)
