= United States v. Utah Construction & Mining Co. =

United States v. Utah Construction & Mining Company
- Supreme Court of the United States

Argued March 23–24, 1966 Decided June 6, 1966
- Full case name: United States v. Utah Construction & Mining Company
- Citations: 384 U.S. 394 (more) 86 S. Ct. 1545; 16 L. Ed. 2d 642; 1966 U.S. LEXIS 2747

Case history
- Prior: 339 F.2d 606 (Ct. Cl. 1965) (aff'd in part and rev'd in part)

Court membership
- Chief Justice Earl Warren Associate Justices Hugo Black · William O. Douglas; Tom C. Clark · John M. Harlan II; William J. Brennan Jr. · Potter Stewart; Byron White · Abe Fortas

Case opinion
- Majority: White, joined by unanimous

Laws applied
- Tucker Act; Wunderlich Act

United States v. Utah Construction & Mining Company, 384 U.S. 394 (1966), is a United States Supreme Court case in which the Court held that "(w)hen an administrative agency is acting in a judicial capacity and resolves disputed issues of fact properly before it which the parties have had an adequate opportunity to litigate, the courts have not hesitated to apply res judicata to enforce repose." Utah Construction established a two-part test to determine whether res judicata effect should be given to an administrative determination. First, the agency proceeding must be examined to determine whether the agency was "acting in a judicial capacity" and whether the parties had "an adequate opportunity to litigate" the issues before the agency. Second, the general rules of res judicata must be applied to the case. Not all administrative adjudications, and not all judicial determinations, are entitled to res judicata effect. For the principles of res judicata to apply, administrative determinations, like court judgments, must be valid, final and on the merits.

== Background ==
The typical construction contract between the Government and a private contractor provides for an equitable adjustments if the government orders certain changes in the work or if the contractor encounters changed conditions differing materially from those ordinarily anticipated. It also provides that the contract shall not be terminated nor the contractor charged with liquidated damages if he is delayed in completing the work by unforeseeable conditions beyond his control. A disputes clause will provide that "all disputes concerning questions of fact arising under this contract" shall be decided by the contracting officer subject to written appeal to the head of the department, "whose decision shall be final and conclusive upon the parties thereto." Appeals from the decision of the contracting officer are characteristically heard by a board or committee designated by the head of the contracting department or agency. Should the contractor be dissatisfied with the administrative decision and bring a Tucker Act suit for breach of contract in the Court of Claims or the District Court, 28 U. S. C. § 1346 (a)(2) (1964 ed.), the finality accorded administrative fact finding by the disputes clause is limited by the provisions of the Wunderlich Act of 1954 which directs that such a decision "shall be final and conclusive unless the same is fra[u]dulent or capricious or arbitrary or so grossly erroneous as necessarily to imply bad faith, or is not supported by substantial evidence." With respect to this statutory provision [*400] we held in United [**1549] States v. Carlo Bianchi & Co., 373 U.S. 709, that where the evidentiary basis for the administrative decision is challenged in a breach of contract suit, Congress did not intend a de novo determination of the facts by the court, which must confine its review to the administrative record made at the time of the administrative appeal.

A contract between a construction company and a Federal agency contained such equitable adjustment clauses determining how the parties would handle unexpected contingencies. The contract also contained such a "Disputes" clause (Article 15), which provided that a designated administrative agency (in this case, the Advisory Board of Contract Appeals) would be the "final and conclusive" arbiter of "all disputes concerning questions of fact arising under this contract" . Id at 396.

When the contractor sought several adjustments under the "changed conditions" clause, the Advisory Board of Contract Appeals made the following factual determinations:

1. the conditions underlying one of the contractor's claims (its "Pier Drilling" claim) met the definition of a "changed condition" within the meaning of Article 4;
2. however, these changed conditions were not what caused the delay experienced by the contractor, thus not justifying a time extension or delay damages;
3. the contractor's second claim (its "Shield Window" claim) was not caused by "changed conditions" within Article 4;
4. the delay experienced by the contractor under this claim was the fault of neither party, thus justifying a time extension under Article 9.
5. the contractor's third claim, for additional compensation on account of the government providing poor quality concrete aggregate, was untimely, as it was not an issue "under the contract" but was instead for breach of contract (government-caused, unreasonable delay[unliquidated damages for breach of warranty or for delay]), in which case Article 15 did not apply, the agency lacked jurisdiction, and the contractor would be entitled to sue in court.

The contractor brought a breach of contract action (pursuant to the Tucker Act, 28 U.S.C. §1346(a)(2) to the Court of Claims. This court held that:

1. both the Pier Drilling and Shield Window claims alleged unreasonable delay by the government, i.e. breach of contract;
2. as such claims were not "under the contract," they were not covered by the disputes clause, thus entitling the contractor to a de novo factual determination by the Court of Claims. (However, the dissenting judge felt that the contract barred de novo factual determination of these issues, as Articles 4 and 9 authorized the administrative agency to determine the cause of the delay.
3. if the concrete aggregate claim were for breach of contract, the contractor would be entitled to determination of the factual underlying by a judicial trial as well.
1. The government claimed that the disputes clause called for finality in all of the agency's findings of facts, not merely in those made in connection with disputes arising under provisions of the contract that contemplate equitable adjustments upon specified contingencies (in this case, Articles 3, 4, and 9), but in connection with "all disputes arising between the parties in the course of completing the contract." As a result, the concrete aggregate claim would not be subject to de novo factual review.
2. Regarding the disagreement in the Court of Claims on the Pier Drilling and Shield Window claims:

- GIVEN that it is settled under Court of Claims jurisprudence that the disputes clause comprehends disputes for which "complete relief is available under a specific contract adjustment provision" -- i.e. "disputes over rights given by the contract" -- which thus cannot be tried de novo in a suit for breach of contract, Morrison-Knudsen Co. v. United States (the agency's findings being subject to review only as permitted by the Wunderlich Act as applied in United States v. Carlo Bianchi & Co.),
- and GIVEN that it is settled that the parties may sue for breach of contract "when only partial relief is available under the contract [such that] the remedies under the contract are not exclusive" (e.g. an extension of time under Article 4).

- ... in such a breach of contract suit for relief unavailable under the contract, may the parties seek de novo review of factual issues?

== Opinion of the Court ==
1. The Supreme Court rejected the government's view of the scope of the disputes clause, holding the parties' dispute clause did not cover all disputes relating to the contract. The phrase "under the contract" referred only to sections that called for "equitable adjustments" (in case of certain costly contingencies). Thus, the court would not extend the phrase to factual disputes alleging a “breach of contract”, and permitted these to be appealed. Pp. 384 U. S. 403–418.

Reasons:

(a) In decisions both before and after the execution of this contract, the Court of Claims had established that the jurisdiction of Boards of Contract Appeals was limited to claims under specific contract provisions authorizing relief, and that contractors need not process pure breach of contract claims through the disputes machinery before filing suit. Pp. 384 U. S. 405-406.
(b) It was the settled practice of the Boards of Contract Appeals at the time of execution of this contract to refuse to consider pure breach of contract claims. P. 384 U. S. 406.
(c) While some Boards possess authority to make factual findings in cases where they have no jurisdiction to grant relief, such findings have no binding effect. Pp. 384 U. S. 407-411.
(d) Congress and the military procurement agencies recognize the jurisdictional limitations of the Boards by enacting alternative administrative remedies and by fashioning additional contract adjustment provisions to deal with claims for delay damages such as presented here. Pp. 384 U. S. 413-417.
(e) The development of these additional contractual provisions illustrates not only administrative acceptance of the narrow interpretation of the disputes clause, but also indicates the lack of any compelling reason to overturn that interpretation now. Pp. 384 U. S. 417-418.

1. Regarding the Pier Drilling and Shield Window claims, the Supreme Court favored the government's position and overturned the Court of Claims. Although the Board lacked authority to consider delay damages under these claims, it did have authority to consider the requests for extensions of time under the relevant contract provisions, requests which called for an administrative determination of the facts. Such determinations of fact (subject to the Wunderlich Act as applied in Bianchi) "are conclusive on the parties," not only under the relevant contract provisions, but also in the court suit for breach of contract and delay damages. Pp. 384 U. S. 418–9

Reasons:

(a) Both the disputes clause and the Wunderlich Act provide that administrative findings on factual issues relevant to questions arising under the contract shall be final and conclusive on the parties. P. 384 U. S. 419.
(b) “Any claim … can be couched in breach of contract language”; the court will not permit a party compel relitigation of a matter simply by doing so. P. 384 U. S. 419. There is a hazard that a party, after administrative review of a recovery "under the contract," might be attempting to mischaracterize the dispute as a "breach of contract" in order to get an appeal. The court justifies this exception because doing otherwise would work contrary to the purposes of the disputes clause (i.e. encouraging frivolous mischaracterizations of disputes that were designed to fall under that clause), and because it would create needless reduplication of evidentiary hearings.
(c) United States v. Carlo Bianchi & Co., 373 U. S. 709, held that administrative findings in the course of adjudicating claims within the disputes clause were not to be retried in the Court of Claims, but were only to be reviewed on the administrative record. P. 384 U. S. 420.
(d) This result is in accord with the principles of collateral estoppel. Pp. 384 U. S. 421-422.
(e) Since the Board was acting in a judicial capacity when it considered these claims, the factual disputes were relevant to the issues properly before it, and both parties had an opportunity to argue their version of the facts and to seek court review of adverse findings, there is no need or justification for a second evidentiary hearing on these matters. P. 384 U. S. 422

== Subsequent developments ==
Under the Contract Disputes Act: Section 6(a) of the act, 41 U.S.C. § 605(a), provides that "all claims by a contractor against the government relating to a contract" (emphasis supplied) are to be first submitted to the contracting officer for decision. Furthermore, under section 8(d), 41 U.S.C. § 607(d), a board of contract appeals can "decide any appeal from a decision of a contracting officer" (emphasis supplied), with limited review by this court, pursuant to section 10 of the act, 41 U.S.C. § 609. Hence, only by election to proceed under the act can a contractor have a breach of contract claim heard by a contracting officer or board of contract appeals.
