= Sheppard v. Maxwell =

United States Supreme Court case

- Supreme Court of the United States

Argued February 28, 1966 Decided June 6, 1966
- Full case name: Sheppard v. Maxwell
- Citations: 384 U.S. 333 (more) 86 S.Ct. 1507; 16 L. Ed. 2d 600; 1966 U.S. LEXIS 1413; 1 Med. L. Rptr. 1220

Case history
- Prior: Appeal from the Sixth Circuit Court of Appeals

Holding
- Sheppard did not receive a fair trial due to media interference.

Court membership
- Chief Justice Earl Warren Associate Justices Hugo Black · William O. Douglas; Tom C. Clark · John M. Harlan II; William J. Brennan Jr. · Potter Stewart; Byron White · Abe Fortas

Case opinions
- Majority: Clark, joined by Warren, Douglas, Harlan, Brennan, Stewart, White, Fortas
- Dissent: Black

Laws applied
- U.S. Const. amend. I, U.S. Const. amend. VI

Sheppard v. Maxwell, 384 U.S. 333 (1966), was a United States Supreme Court case that examined a defendant's right to a fair trial as required by the Sixth Amendment and the Due Process Clause of the Fourteenth Amendment. In particular, the Court sought to determine whether or not Sam Sheppard, the defendant, was denied fair trial for the second-degree murder of his wife, of which he was convicted, because of the trial judge's failure to protect him sufficiently "from the massive, pervasive, and prejudicial publicity that attended his prosecution".

== Background ==
After suffering a trial court conviction of second-degree murder for the bludgeoning death of his pregnant wife, Sheppard challenged the verdict as the product of an unfair trial. Sheppard, who maintained his innocence of the crime, alleged that the trial judge failed to protect him "from the massive, widespread and prejudicial publicity that attended his prosecution". An Ohio federal district court ruled in his favor but the Court of Appeals for the Sixth Circuit reversed that decision. Sheppard petitioned the Supreme Court to hear the case by writ of certiorari, and the Supreme Court granted the petition.

== Decision ==
Justice Tom C. Clark delivered the opinion of the Court. He wrote:

This federal habeas corpus application involves the question whether Sheppard was deprived of a fair trial in his state conviction for the second-degree murder of his wife because of the trial judge's failure to protect Sheppard sufficiently from the massive, pervasive and prejudicial publicity that attended his persecution. ... We have concluded that Sheppard did not receive a fair trial consistent with the Due Process Clause of the Fourteenth Amendment and, therefore, reverse the judgement.

== See also ==
- F. Lee Bailey
- List of United States Supreme Court cases, volume 384
- Continuance

== Bibliography ==
- The Wrong Man: The Final Verdict on the Dr. Sam Sheppard Murder Case (Random House, 2001) ISBN 978-0679457190
