= Cheff v. Schnackenberg =

- Supreme Court of the United States

Argued March 3, 1966 Decided June 6, 1966
- Full case name: Cheff v. Schnackenberg, U.S. Circuit Judge, et al.
- Citations: 384 U.S. 373 (more) 86 S. Ct. 1523; 16 L. Ed. 2d 629; 1966 U.S. LEXIS 2949; 1966 Trade Cas. (CCH) ¶ 71,786

Court membership
- Chief Justice Earl Warren Associate Justices Hugo Black · William O. Douglas; Tom C. Clark · John M. Harlan II; William J. Brennan Jr. · Potter Stewart; Byron White · Abe Fortas

Case opinions
- Plurality: Clark, joined by Warren, Brennan, Fortas
- Concurrence: Harlan (in result), joined by Stewart (Part I)
- Dissent: Douglas, joined by Black
- White took no part in the consideration or decision of the case.

Cheff v. Schnackenberg, 384 U.S. 373 (1966), is a United States Supreme Court case in which the Court held that crimes carrying possible penalties up to six months' imprisonment do not require a jury trial if they otherwise qualify as petty offenses.
