= Doggett v. United States =

- Supreme Court of the United States

Argued October 9, 1991 Reargued February 24, 1992 Decided June 24, 1992
- Full case name: Marc Gilbert Doggett, Petitioner v. United States
- Citations: 505 U.S. 647 (more) 112 S. Ct. 2686; 120 L. Ed. 2d 520; 1992 U.S. LEXIS 4362; 60 U.S.L.W. 4741; 92 Cal. Daily Op. Service 5442; 92 Daily Journal DAR 8657; 6 Fla. L. Weekly Fed. S 604

Case history
- Prior: United States v. Doggett, 906 F.2d 573 (11th Cir. 1990); cert. granted, 498 U.S. 1119 (1991).

Holding
- The 8½ year delay between indictment and arrest violated his Sixth Amendment right to a speedy trial, arguing that the Government had been negligent in pursuing him and that Doggett had remained unaware of the indictment until his arrest.

Court membership
- Chief Justice William Rehnquist Associate Justices Byron White · Harry Blackmun; John P. Stevens · Sandra Day O'Connor; Antonin Scalia · Anthony Kennedy; David Souter · Clarence Thomas

Case opinions
- Majority: Souter, joined by White, Blackmun, Stevens, Kennedy
- Dissent: O'Connor
- Dissent: Thomas, joined by Rehnquist, Scalia

Doggett v. United States, 505 U.S. 647 (1992), was a case decided by the Supreme Court of the United States. The court held that the 8 1/2 year delay between Doggett's indictment and actual arrest violated his Sixth Amendment right to a speedy trial, arguing that the government had been negligent in pursuing him and that Doggett had remained unaware of the indictment until his arrest.

== Background ==
Marc Doggett was indicted in February 1980 on charges of conspiring with several others to import and distribute cocaine. Douglas Driver, the Drug Enforcement Administration's principal agent in the case, informed the United States Marshals Service that DEA would oversee the arrest of Doggett and his confederates.

One month later, in March 1980, two police officers (under orders from Driver) traveled to Raleigh, North Carolina, to arrest Doggett at his parents' house. However, the officers learned from Doggett's mother that he had left for Colombia four days earlier. Upon learning of Doggett's actions, in an attempt to arrest Doggett upon his return, Driver notified the United States Customs stations and several law enforcement agencies, as well as posting Doggett's info on the Treasury Enforcement Communication System (the TECS info expired in September 1980 and was not re-entered).

Driver learned in September 1981 that Doggett had been arrested in Panama on drug charges. Believing an extradition request to be futile, Driver merely asked Panamanian authorities to "expel" Doggett to the United States upon his release; though they promised to comply, upon Doggett's release they freed him the following July and allowed him to travel to Colombia. The American Embassy in Panama notified the Department of State of Doggett's departure to Colombia, but DEA was never informed and presumed that Doggett was still in a Panamanian prison. Driver would not learn of Doggett's travels to Colombia until he was reassigned to Colombia in 1985; he presumed that Doggett had settled in Colombia and (possibly believing that Colombia would also, like Panama, not agree to extradite Doggett) made no effort to track him down.

However, this was not the case: Doggett had returned to the United States on September 25, 1982, passing through Customs in New York City with no incident. Upon his return, Doggett did not return to the drug trade; instead he settled down in Virginia, married, earned a college degree, found a steady job, lived openly under his own name, and "stayed within the law". Most notably, Doggett was never made aware of the indictment against him. Only in September 1988, when the Marshal's Service ran a credit check on several thousand people, did they find out where Doggett was living; Doggett was finally arrested on September 5 of that year, nearly 8 1/2 years after his indictment and almost 6 1/2 years after his return to the United States.

== Court proceedings ==
Doggett moved to have the indictment dismissed on speedy trial grounds. The federal magistrate (using the factors set forth in Barker v. Wingo) agreed with Doggett that the length of the delay was long enough to be "presumptively prejudicial", that the delay "clearly [was] attributable to the negligence of the government", and that "Doggett could not be faulted for any delay in asserting his right to a speedy trial, there being no evidence that he had known of the charges against him until his arrest". However, the magistrate found that "Doggett had made no affirmative showing that the delay had impaired his ability to mount a successful defense or had otherwise prejudiced him" and in its recommendation to the district court "contended that this failure to demonstrate particular prejudice sufficed to defeat Doggett's speedy trial claim".

The district court adopted the magistrate's recommendation and denied Doggett's motion. Doggett then entered a conditional plea of guilty, reserving the right to appeal the speedy trial claim. A split panel of the United States Court of Appeals for the Eleventh Circuit affirmed the district court's ruling in 1990. The majority agreed with the magistrate that Doggett had not shown actual prejudice, and attributing the government's actions to "negligence" rather than "bad faith", concluded that "Barker's first three factors did not weigh so heavily against the government as to make proof of specific prejudice unnecessary". The dissent argued that the majority had placed too much emphasis on Doggett's inability to prove actual prejudice. The United States Supreme Court granted a writ of certiorari in 1991.

== Decision of the court ==
In a 5–4 decision in favor of Doggett, Justice Souter wrote the opinion of the court. Justice Souter noted that the question before the court was whether or not eight and half years between the plaintiff's indictment and arrest violated his Sixth Amendment right to a speedy trial. Citing previous Supreme Court cases, Justice Souter notes, "[The Supreme Court has] observed in prior cases that unreasonable delay between formal accusation and trial threatens to produce more than one sort of harm, including 'oppressive pretrial incarceration', 'anxiety and concern of the accused', and 'the possibility that the [accused's] defense will be impaired'", citing the three cases Barker, Smith v. Hooey, and United States v. Ewell.

== Dissenting opinion ==
Justice O'Connor in dissent noted that Doggett's liberty was never inhibited between his indictment and arrest, and therefore did not have his Sixth Amendment right to a speedy trial violated. She added, "Although the delay between indictment and trial was lengthy, [the] petitioner did not suffer any anxiety or restriction on his liberty."

== See also ==
- List of United States Supreme Court cases, volume 505
- List of United States Supreme Court cases by the Rehnquist Court
