= Watts Restaurant and Grill =

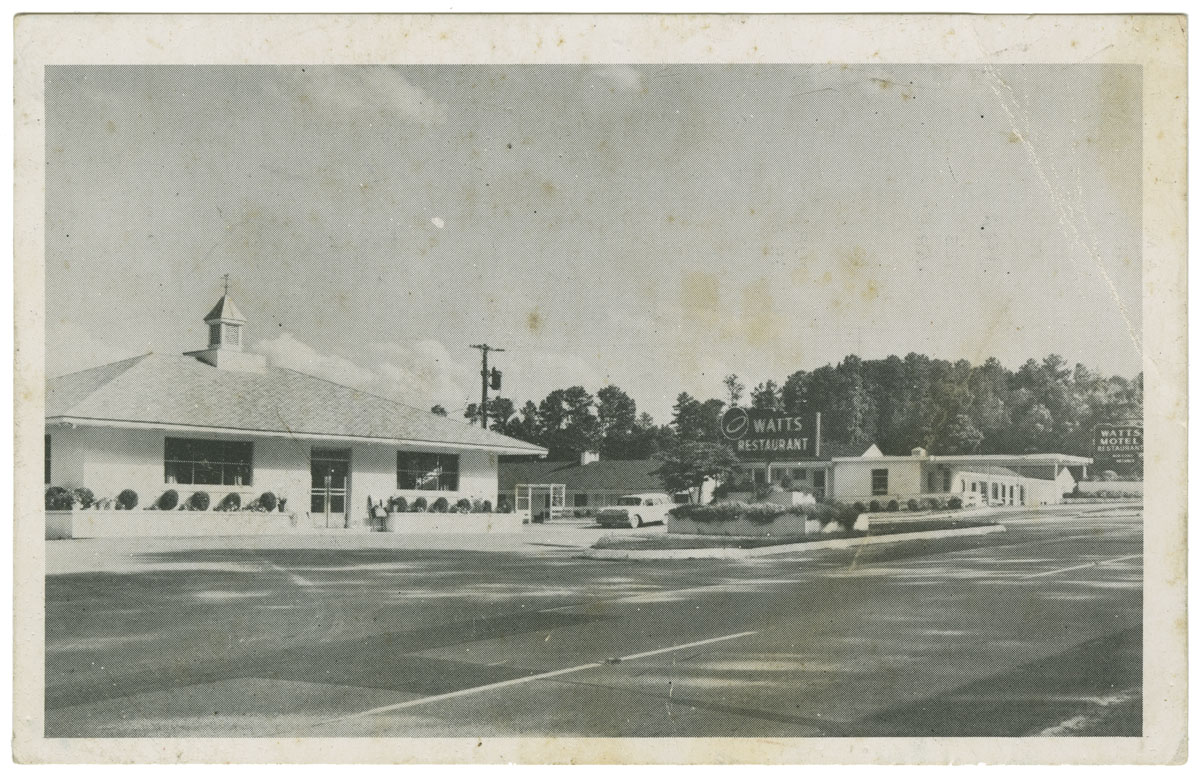
- Interactive map of Watts Restaurant and Grill

Restaurant information
- Established: Early 1950s
- Closed: March 1965
- Previous owner(s): Austin and Jeppie Watts
- Location: 3819 S Columbia Street, Chapel Hill, North Carolina
- Coordinates: 35°52′46″N 79°3′47″W

Watts Restaurant and Grill was a restaurant operating in Chapel Hill, Orange County, North Carolina throughout the 1950s and 60s. The restaurant shared the property with a motel, which operated under the same name.

Watts Restaurant was founded in the early 1950s by Austin and Jeppie Watts. In the 1950s and 1960s, Watts Grill became a popular venue for the KKK, as well as students and fraternity organizations from the University of North Carolina at Chapel Hill. Fraternities such as Lambda Chi Alpha, Chi Phi, and Delta Kappa Epsilon, among others, would visit Watts Grill during pledge week and frequently host parties there. Despite the restaurant's growing popularity, the Wattses remained adamant in their ways and refused to serve any Black clientele.

== Civil Rights Protests ==
=== Background ===
In the 1960s, Chapel Hill was a small college town in the midst of the civil rights movement. While the town had a reputation for being liberal, about a quarter of Chapel Hill's institutions were still segregated. In 1963, sit-in campaigns were organized all around the town to attempt to convince the local businesses to integrate. These events led to the arrest of over 200 students from local high schools and UNC Chapel Hill.

=== The Sit-Ins ===
On January 2, a group of six individuals entered Watts Restaurant, wanting to be served food. This group of demonstrators consisted of several Black students from Lincoln High School including Carolyn Edwards, Mae Black, and Stella Farrar, as well as Jerdene Alston and James Foushee, both of whom attended North Carolina Central University. Two white students from the University of North Carolina at Chapel Hill accompanied these individuals, Van Cornelius and senior, Lou Calhoun. After being denied service, the students laid down in an act of protest and refused to leave the restaurant. In response, Jeppie Watts urinated on both Lou Calhoun and James Foushee. The aftermath of this was captured by UNC professor, Al Amon, who joined the group as their photographer. The police were called and all of the demonstrators were arrested for criminal trespassing, while the Wattses received no charges.

The following day, January 3, a group of professors and students from UNC and Duke, organized by the Chapel Hill Freedom Committee, attempted another sit in. The group was composed of five white professors from Duke, two white professors from UNC, and four students. The Duke professors included Peter Klopfer, David Smith, Frederick Herzog, Harmon Smith, and Robert Osborn. The professors from UNC, William Wynn and Albert Amon, arrived at Watts "determined to be arrested." The students, all from UNC, included three Black protestors and one white protestor: Tom Bynum, Ben Spaulding, Quinton Baker, and John Dunne. The group did not enter Watts, as they were stopped in the parking lot by restaurant staff. During this encounter, the protestors were sprayed with hoses and beaten until the police department arrived, who ultimately arrested the individuals for trespassing.

Throughout the spring of that year, trials were held for many of the demonstrators involved in the sit-ins. Several protestors were found guilty of criminal trespassing and sentenced to several months in jail. The severity of the sentences of the demonstrators were later reduced by Terry Sanford.

=== Klopfer v. North Carolina ===
Peter Klopfer, a zoology professor from Duke University, had to wait significantly longer than the other protestors for his case to be tried. He was charged with trespassing, but the local prosecutor put his case on hold for 18 months after an initial mistrial, citing nolle prosequi. The case ultimately made its way to the United States Supreme Court, where the Court held that Klopfer's right to a speedy trial had been violated, and that the Sixth Amendment applies to the states through the Due Process Clause.

=== Goals of the protests ===
The sit-ins at Watts Restaurant were part of a broader movement in the town of Chapel Hill, which included protests and sit-ins at other local businesses. Each demonstration at Watts garnered the attention of several newspapers across the state of North Carolina, drawing attention to the movement and their cause.

== Transition and decline ==
=== Desegregation ===
After Congress passed the Civil Rights Act on July 2, 1964, Austin and Jeppie Watts initially refused to desegregate their establishment. In response, civil rights "testers," staged sit-ins at Watts Grill and other businesses in Chapel Hill that neglected to comply with the new law. Activists were met with violent counter-protestors, including Austin Watts himself, who was charged with assault and battery for repeatedly punching one of the protestors, Peter Leak. Watts was eventually forced to integrate the restaurant on July 10, 1964, after being threatened with a lawsuit.

=== Sale and closure ===
In March 1965, the Watts family sold the restaurant and motel to Manning A. Simons. Eventually, the buildings were demolished around the year 2000.

== See also ==
- Greensboro sit-ins
- Royal Ice Cream sit-in
- Civil rights movement
- Sit-in movement
