= List of United States Supreme Court cases, volume 384 =

This is a list of all the United States Supreme Court cases from volume 384 of the United States Reports:

Case name	Citation	Date decided
Brookhart v. Janis	384 U.S. 1	1966
Elfbrandt v. Russell	384 U.S. 11	1966
Louisiana v. Mississippi	384 U.S. 24	1966
Holt v. Alleghany Corp.	384 U.S. 28	1966
Am. Guild v. Smith	384 U.S. 30	1966
Engle v. Kerner	384 U.S. 30	1966
Hollingshead v. Wainwright	384 U.S. 31	1966
Long v. Parker	384 U.S. 32	1966
Pope v. Daggett	384 U.S. 33	1966
Richardson v. HEW	384 U.S. 34	1966
Joseph E. Seagram & Sons, Inc. v. Hostetter	384 U.S. 35	1966
Collier v. United States	384 U.S. 59	1966
Wallis v. Pan Am. Petrol. Corp.	384 U.S. 63	1966
Burns v. Richardson	384 U.S. 73	1966
Ford v. California	384 U.S. 100	1966
Kramer v. United States	384 U.S. 100	1966
Shannon v. Sequeechi	384 U.S. 101	1966
Prensky v. Geller	384 U.S. 101	1966
United States v. Catto	384 U.S. 102	1966
NAACP v. Overstreet	384 U.S. 118	1966
United States v. Gen. Motors Corp.	384 U.S. 127	1966
Westbrook v. Arizona	384 U.S. 150	1966
Riggan v. Virginia	384 U.S. 152	1966
Baer v. New York	384 U.S. 154	1966
United States v. Clayton	384 U.S. 154	1966
Texas v. United States (1966)	384 U.S. 155	1966
Clayton v. United States	384 U.S. 156	1966
Children of Israel v. Tamarkin	384 U.S. 157	1966
Amell v. United States	384 U.S. 158	1966
SEC v. New England Elec. Sys.	384 U.S. 176	1966
Ashton v. Kentucky	384 U.S. 195	1966
Pure Oil Co. v. Suarez	384 U.S. 202	1966
Barrios v. Florida	384 U.S. 208	1966
Winters v. Washington	384 U.S. 208	1966
Simmons v. Seelatsee	384 U.S. 209	1966
Izzo v. Eyman	384 U.S. 209	1966
Toombs v. Fortson	384 U.S. 210	1966
Selman v. Phillips	384 U.S. 210	1966
Hanson v. Ches. & Ohio R.R. Co.	384 U.S. 211	1966
Haspel v. State Bd. of Educ.	384 U.S. 211	1966
United States v. Fisher	384 U.S. 212	1966
Illinois ex rel. Musso v. Chi. B. & Q.R.R. Co.	384 U.S. 213	1966
Mills v. Alabama	384 U.S. 214	1966
United States v. Standard Oil Co.	384 U.S. 224	1966
Ry. Clerks v. Fla. E. Coast R.R. Co.	384 U.S. 238	1966
United States v. Blue	384 U.S. 251	1966
United States v. Cook	384 U.S. 257	1966
Redmond v. United States	384 U.S. 264	1966
Wylan v. California	384 U.S. 266	1966
Venable v. Texas	384 U.S. 266	1966
Day v. United States	384 U.S. 267	1966
Rutherford v. Washington	384 U.S. 267	1966
Colonial Pipeline Co. v. Virginia	384 U.S. 268	1966
Life Assurance Co. v. Pennsylvania	384 U.S. 268	1966
Greer v. Beto	384 U.S. 269	1966
United States v. Von's Grocery Co.	384 U.S. 270	1966
Rinaldi v. Yeager	384 U.S. 305	1966
Rees v. Peyton	384 U.S. 312	1966
Tillman v. City of Port Arthur	384 U.S. 315	1966
Alton v. Tawes	384 U.S. 315	1966
FTC v. Brown Shoe Co.	384 U.S. 316	1966
United States v. Equitable Life Assurance Soc'y	384 U.S. 323	1966
Sheppard v. Maxwell	384 U.S. 333	1966
Shillitani v. United States	384 U.S. 364	1966
Cheff v. Schnackenberg	384 U.S. 373	1966
United States v. Utah Constr. & Mining Co.	384 U.S. 394	1966
United States v. Anthony Grace & Sons, Inc.	384 U.S. 424	1966
Double Eagle Lubricants, Inc. v. Texas	384 U.S. 434	1966
Lambright v. California	384 U.S. 434	1966
Daughterty v. Tennessee	384 U.S. 435	1966
Jenkins v. Birzgalis	384 U.S. 435	1966
Miranda v. Arizona	384 U.S. 436	1966
United States v. Pabst Brewing Co.	384 U.S. 546	1966
United States v. Grinnell Corp.	384 U.S. 563	1966
FTC v. Dean Foods Co.	384 U.S. 597	1966
Katzenbach v. Morgan	384 U.S. 641	1966
Cardona v. Power	384 U.S. 672	1966
Nicholas v. United States	384 U.S. 678	1966
Gojack v. United States	384 U.S. 702	1966
Great Lakes Pipe Line Co. v. Comm'r of Tax'n	384 U.S. 718	1966
Gray v. Illinois	384 U.S. 718	1966
Johnson v. New Jersey	384 U.S. 719	1966
Davis v. North Carolina	384 U.S. 737	1966
Schmerber v. California	384 U.S. 757	1966
Georgia v. Rachel	384 U.S. 780	1966
City of Greenwood v. Peacock	384 U.S. 808	1966
Dennis v. United States	384 U.S. 855	1966
Leon v. United States (1966)	384 U.S. 882	1966
Cavanaugh v. California	384 U.S. 882	1966
Nat'l Dairy Prods. Corp. v. United States	384 U.S. 883	1966
Am. Canyon Cnty. Water Dist. v. Pub. Util. Comm'n	384 U.S. 883	1966
Lucignano v. United States	384 U.S. 884	1966
Hale v. New Jersey	384 U.S. 884	1966
England v. La. Bd. of Med. Exam'rs	384 U.S. 885	1966
Levine v. United States	384 U.S. 885	1966
Castaldi v. United States	384 U.S. 886	1966
Lomenzo v. WMCA	384 U.S. 887	1966
United States v. Atchison T. & S.F.R.R. Co.	384 U.S. 888	1966
New Jersey v. Russo	384 U.S. 889	1966
Baines v. Danville	384 U.S. 890	1966
Wallace v. Virginia	384 U.S. 891	1966
Miller v. Rhay	384 U.S. 892	1966
Griffin v. Maryland	384 U.S. 893	1966
Worthy v. United States	384 U.S. 894	1966
Whisman v. Georgia	384 U.S. 895	1966
