= Speedy Trial Act =

1974 United States federal law

The Speedy Trial Act of 1974 (88 Stat. 2080, as amended August 2, 1979, 93 Stat. 328, 18 U.S.C. §§ 3161–3174) establishes time limits for completing the various stages of a federal criminal prosecution in the United States.

== Procedural time limits ==
The Act establishes time limits for completing the various stages of federal criminal prosecution. The information or indictment must be filed within 30 days from the date of arrest or service of the summons. Trial must commence within 70 days from the date the information or indictment was filed, or from the date the defendant appears before an officer of the court in which the charge is pending, whichever is later.

Moreover, in order to ensure that defendants are not rushed to trial without an adequate opportunity to prepare, Congress amended the Act in 1979 to provide a minimum time period during which trial may not commence. Thus, the Act provides that trial may not begin less than 30 days from the date the defendant first appears in court unless the defendant agrees in writing to an earlier date. In United States v. Rojas-Contreras, 474 U.S. 231 (1985), the Supreme Court held that this 30-day trial preparation period is not restarted upon the filing of a substantially similar superseding indictment.

If the indictment is dismissed at the defendant's request, the Act's provisions apply anew upon reinstatement of the charge. If the indictment is dismissed at the request of the government, the 70-day clock is paused during the period when no indictment is outstanding, and begins to run again upon the filing of the second indictment. If the trial ends in a mistrial, or the court grants a motion for a new trial, the second trial must begin within 70 days "from the date the action occasioning the retrial becomes final."

=== Delays that are not included in the Act ===
Certain pretrial delays are automatically excluded from the Act's time limits, such as delays caused by pretrial motions. In Henderson v. United States, 476 U.S. 321, 330 (1986), the Supreme Court held that § 3161 excludes "all time between the filing of a motion and the conclusion of the hearing on that motion, whether or not a delay in holding that hearing is 'reasonably necessary.'" The Act also excludes a reasonable period (up to 30 days) during which a motion is actually "under advisement" by the court. Other delays excluded from the Act's time limits include delays caused by the unavailability of the defendant or an essential witness (18 U.S.C. § 3161(h)(3)); delays attributable to a co-defendant (18 U.S.C. § 3161(h)(7)); and delays attributable to the defendant's involvement in other proceedings, including delay resulting from an interlocutory appeal. (Note, however, that the 30-day defense preparation period provided for in 3161(c)(2) is calculated without reference to Section 3161(h) exclusions).

A defendant may not expressly waive his rights under the Speedy Trial Act. However, if the trial judge determines that the "ends of justice" served by a continuance outweigh the interest of the public and the defendant in a speedy trial, the delay occasioned by such continuance is excluded from the Act's time limits. The judge must set forth, orally or in writing, his or her reasons for granting the continuance.

The Act provides a sanction of dismissal for violation of its time limits that may be with or without prejudice to reprosecution. In assessing whether dismissal should be with prejudice, the court must consider the seriousness of the offense, the circumstances leading to dismissal, and the impact that reprosecution would have on the administration of the Act and on the administration of justice. In United States v. Taylor, 487 U.S. 326 (1988), the Supreme Court held that a trial court must examine each statutory factor in deciding to dismiss charges with prejudice. The Court in Taylor found that a minor violation of the time limitations of the act that did not prejudice the defendant's trial preparation did not justify the dismissal with prejudice of an indictment charging serious drug offenses.

Defendants can forfeit the right to obtain a dismissal of the case for a claimed violation of the Act by failing to move for dismissal prior to trial. The statute provides that "[f]ailure of the defendant to move for dismissal prior to trial...shall constitute a waiver of the right to dismissal under this section."

== Juvenile proceedings ==
The Speedy Trial Act is inapplicable to juvenile delinquency proceedings, which have their own speedy trial provision. Furthermore, the Interstate Agreement on Detainers (IAD) provides its own time limits for persons incarcerated in other jurisdictions. In such a case, the government must comply with both the time limits of the IAD and the Speedy Trial Act.

== Constitutional basis ==
A defendant's right to a speedy trial has constitutional and statutory underpinnings in addition to the Speedy Trial Act. Federal statutes of limitations provide a time frame within which charges must be filed. Moreover, Rule 48 of the Federal Rules of Criminal Procedure, grants trial courts discretion to dismiss cases that are not brought to trial promptly.

Even if a charge is brought within the period provided by the statute of limitations, a defendant may be able to show that preaccusation delay has violated his or her Fifth Amendment due process rights. To obtain a dismissal of the charges by reason of pre-indictment delay, a defendant has the burden of establishing that the government engaged in intentional delay to gain a tactical advantage, and that he suffered actual prejudice.

A defendant's rights under the Speedy Trial Clause of the Sixth Amendment are triggered by "either a formal indictment or information or else the actual restraints imposed by arrest and holding to answer a criminal charge." (As noted above, any delay before this time must be scrutinized under the Due Process Clause of the Fifth Amendment, not the Sixth Amendment's Speedy Trial Clause. In Barker v. Wingo, 407 U.S. 514 (1972), the Supreme Court set out a four-factor test for determining whether delay between the initiation of criminal proceedings and the beginning of trial violates a defendant's Sixth Amendment right to a speedy trial. The test requires the court to consider the length of the delay, the cause of the delay, the defendant's assertion of his or her right to a speedy trial, and the presence or absence of prejudice resulting from the delay.

In United States v. Loud Hawk, 474 U.S. 302 (1986), where the reason for the 90-month delay (interlocutory appeals) did not weigh against the government, the Supreme Court held that the possibility of prejudice occasioned by the delay was not sufficient to establish a Sixth Amendment speedy trial violation. Moreover, the courts of appeals routinely reject Sixth Amendment speedy trial challenges in the absence of a showing of prejudice. However, in Doggett v. United States, 505 U.S. 647 (1992), the Supreme Court held that an "extraordinary" eight-and-one-half-year delay between the defendant's indictment and arrest, which resulted from the government's "egregious persistence in failing to prosecute [him]," violated his right to a speedy trial even in the absence of "affirmative proof of particularized prejudice."

Where there are successive state and federal prosecutions, the general rule is that the federal constitutional speedy trial right does not arise until a federal accusation against the defendant is made. Thus, a prior state arrest based on the same facts as the subsequent federal charge does not implicate the federal constitutional guarantee.
