= Barker v. Wingo =

- Supreme Court of the United States

Argued April 11, 1972 Decided June 22, 1972
- Full case name: Willie Mae Barker v. John W. Wingo, Warden
- Citations: 407 U.S. 514 (more) 92 S. Ct. 2182; 33 L. Ed. 2d 101

Case history
- Prior: 442 F.2d 1141 (6th Cir. 1971); cert. granted, 404 U.S. 1037 (1972).

Holding
- Determinations of whether the Sixth Amendment right to a speedy trial has been violated must be done on a case-by-case basis.

Court membership
- Chief Justice Warren E. Burger Associate Justices William O. Douglas · William J. Brennan Jr. Potter Stewart · Byron White; Thurgood Marshall · Harry Blackmun; Lewis F. Powell Jr. · William Rehnquist

Case opinions
- Majority: Powell, joined by unanimous
- Concurrence: White, joined by Brennan

Barker v. Wingo, 407 U.S. 514 (1972), was a United States Supreme Court case involving the Sixth Amendment to the U.S. Constitution, specifically the right of defendants in criminal cases to a speedy trial. The Court held that determinations of whether or not the right to a speedy trial has been violated must be made on a case-by-case basis, and set forth four factors to be considered in the determination.

== Facts and trial ==
On July 20, 1958, an elderly couple in Christian County, Kentucky were murdered in their home by intruders, later identified as Willie Barker and Silas Manning.

Believing that the case against Manning was the stronger of the two, and that Manning's testimony was needed to convict Barker (in his own case, Manning exercised his right under the Fifth Amendment to not incriminate himself), the prosecution chose to try Manning first, hoping that once convicted, Manning would later voluntarily testify against Barker. At the outset of Manning's trial on October 23, 1958, the prosecution sought and obtained the first of what would be 16 continuances in Barker's trial.

The prosecution, however, encountered numerous difficulties in getting a conviction against Manning; it would not be until December 1962 that Manning would be convicted in the second of the two murders. As the Christian County Circuit Court only held three terms each year (in February, June, and September), for each term the prosecution would seek a continuance in the Barker case, until the beginning of the following term, while the Manning cases were ongoing.

Barker, through his counsel, did not object to any of the first eleven continuances. But on the 12th continuance (February 1962) Barker's counsel filed a motion to dismiss on speedy trial grounds, which was rejected. Barker's counsel did not object to the 13th or 14th continuances, but objected to the 15th continuance (March 1963 on the date of Barker's trial; the prosecution sought a continuance due to illness of the former sheriff, the chief investigating officer in the case) as well as the 16th continuance (June 1963, requested for the sheriff's continued illness; while granting the continuance the Circuit Court ruled that the matter had to come to trial at the next term or would be dismissed for lack of prosecution).

The final trial date was set for October 9, 1963 and on that date, after Barker's counsel made another unsuccessful motion to dismiss on speedy trial grounds, the trial was finally commenced; with Manning the chief prosecution witness, Barker was convicted and given a life sentence.

== Appeals ==
Barker appealed his conviction on speedy trial grounds to the Kentucky Court of Appeals, which affirmed it in 1964.

In 1970 Barker filed a habeas corpus petition in the United States District Court for the Western District of Kentucky. Though the District Court denied the petition, it granted Barker the right to proceed in forma pauperis and a certificate of probable cause to appeal.

The United States Court of Appeals for the Sixth Circuit affirmed the District Court's decision in 1971. The Sixth Circuit argued that Barker had waived any speedy trial claims up through February 1963 (which the Sixth Circuit erroneously believed was the first date that Barker's counsel objected to a further continuance) and that the eight-month period between February and October 1963 (the period between the objection and the actual trial) was not unduly long. Further, the Sixth Circuit ruled that granting a continuance based on the sheriff's illness was a justifiable reason for a delay.

The United States Supreme Court granted a writ of certiorari in 1972.

== The Supreme Court decision ==
=== Opinion of the court ===
The Supreme Court first noted that "[t]he right to a speedy trial is generically different from any of the other rights enshrined in the Constitution for the protection of the accused" for three reasons:

- First, the Court noted that "there is a societal interest in providing a speedy trial which exists separate from, and at times in opposition to, the interests of the accused". The Court commented on the backlog of cases, mainly in urban courts, that often enable defendants to negotiate a plea for a lesser offense. The Court also noted that persons released on bond had the opportunity to commit further crimes, "the longer an accused is free awaiting trial, the more tempting becomes his opportunity to jump bail and escape", and that "delay between arrest and punishment may have a detrimental effect on rehabilitation." The Court also noted that if the accused cannot make bail, that too can make rehabilitation difficult, that a lengthy pre-trial detention can be costly, and that "society loses wages which might have been earned, and it must often support families of incarcerated breadwinners."
- Second, the Court noted that "deprivation of the right may work to the accused's advantage." As the time between arrest and trial lengthens, witnesses may become unavailable and/or their memories fade; if the witnesses were for the prosecution the case may be seriously weakened (as the prosecution has the burden to prove the defendant guilty beyond a reasonable doubt).
- Finally, the Court noted that the concept is more vague than with other rights, in that the Court "cannot definitely say how long is too long in a system where justice is supposed to be swift but deliberate."

The Court then noted that there were two competing approaches as to how to handle the uncertainty regarding "how long is too long"; neither of which it accepted:

- One approach (supported by the American Bar Association) was to "hold that the Constitution requires a criminal defendant to be offered a trial within a specified time period." The Court rejected this approach, stating that there was "no constitutional basis for holding that the speedy trial right can be quantified into a specified number of days or months."
- The other approach was to "restrict consideration of the right to those cases in which the accused has demanded a speedy trial." In other words, if the defendant did not specifically demand a trial, the defendant waived his/her right to appeal the matter. The Court also rejected this approach, as it considered a speedy trial to be a fundamental right, and quoting Carnley v. Cochran the Court ruled that "[p]resuming waiver from a silent record is impermissible. The record must show, or there must be an allegation and evidence which show, that an accused was offered counsel but intelligently and understandably rejected the offer. Anything less is not waiver."

As a balancing test, the Court adopted four factors to be considered in determining, on a case-by-case basis, whether a defendant has been prejudiced by the lack of a speedy trial:

1. the length of delay,
2. the reason for the delay,
3. the time and manner in which the defendant has asserted his right, and
4. the degree of prejudice to the defendant which the delay has caused.

Taking these factors into consideration, though, Barker's conviction was upheld. The court agreed that the period of time between initial arrest and trial – over five years – was "extraordinary" and that only seven months of the delay was justifiable (the period of the ex-sheriff's illness).

However, the Court also ruled that Barker was not prejudiced by the delay, since none of Barker's witnesses were harmed by the delay. More importantly, the Court determined that Barker did not want a speedy trial (a fact that Barker's counsel conceded at oral argument). The Court speculated that Barker's reason was his gambling on Manning's acquittal (the evidence against Manning not being strong as evidenced by two hung juries and two appellate court reversals), believing that if Manning was acquitted, he would never be tried (which Barker's counsel also conceded at oral argument). The Court further noted that, after Barker's counsel objected to the February 1962 continuance, he did not object to the June or September 1962 continuances; only in March 1963, after Manning's convictions became final, were objections raised to further continuances (this time brought about by the ex-sheriff's illness, which Barker conceded was a justifiable reason).

=== Concurring opinion ===
Justice White, joined by Justice Brennan, concurred in the verdict, and specifically commented that an overcrowded docket would not be a reasonable basis for a delay.

== See also ==
- List of United States Supreme Court cases, volume 407
- Continuance
