= Speedy trial =

Human right to trial without arbitrary or indefinite delay

In criminal law, the right to a speedy trial is a human right under which it is asserted that a government prosecutor may not delay the trial of a criminal suspect arbitrarily and indefinitely. Otherwise, the power to impose such delays would effectively allow prosecutors to send anyone to jail for an arbitrary length of time without trial, expressed as the maxim "Justice delayed is justice denied."

Although it is important for the protection of speedy trial rights for there to be a court in which a defendant may complain about the unreasonable delay of the trial, it is also important that nations implement structures that avoid the delay.

Jurimetrics allows the estimation the current judicial efficiency. Speedy justice tends to correlate with quality and fairness of justice.

== Recognition of speedy trial rights ==
In jurisdictions with strong rule of law, the requirement of a "speedy trial" forces prosecutors to diligently build cases within a reasonable amount of time commensurate with the complexity and heinousness of the crimes of which suspects are accused. The right is based on the notion that long-term incarceration should normally be restricted to situations in which a judge or jury have determined a suspect has committed a crime.

The right to a speedy trial is codified in fundamental legal documents in several jurisdictions, and may be further defined by statutory law.

=== Bangladesh ===
In Bangladesh, the right to a speedy trial is stated in Article 35(3) of the Constitution of Bangladesh, which provides: "Every person accused of a criminal offence" to "have the right to a speedy and public trial by an independent and impartial Court or tribunal established by law".

The Law and Order Disruption (Speedy Trial) Act (2002), aimed to implement this constitutional right. The Act requires that trials for specified offenses be concluded within 120 days, with a possible extension of 60 days if necessary. Speedy Trial Courts, presided over by Judicial or Metropolitan Magistrates, are established under this law to expedite cases. The act was notably used in The State vs. Mehedi Hasan Rasel and Others criminal case.

In 2024, the Act, initially enacted as a temporary measure, was made permanent, drawing criticism from legal experts and rights organizations.

=== Canada ===
Speedy trial rights are recognized within Section Eleven of the Canadian Charter of Rights and Freedoms.

In R v Jordan, the Supreme Court of Canada held that these Charter rights are presumed to have been violated when the trial does not end within 18 months of the charges being filed, or 30 months when there is a preliminary inquiry. When speedy trial rights are violated, the Crown must drop relevant charges by entering a stay of proceedings.

Once the presumptive ceiling is exceeded, the burden is on the Crown to rebut the presumption of unreasonableness on the basis of exceptional circumstances outside the Crown's control.

=== Europe ===
Within Europe, speedy trial rights are recognized by Article 6 of the European Convention on Human Rights.

In English law, this right was developed by the Assize of Clarendon in 1166 (a judge would be summoned if one was not immediately available) and Magna Carta in 1215 ("To no one will we sell, to no one will we refuse or delay, right or justice.").

=== India ===
The right to a speedy trial is guaranteed under Article 21 of the Constitution of India. There is no automatic legal remedy available to defendants who are denied speedy trials, rendering it difficult to hold judicial officers accountable for violations.

=== Japan ===
The Article 37 of the Japanese Constitution states, "In all criminal cases the accused shall enjoy the right to a speedy and public trial by an impartial tribunal." Takada case, which had not held a court for 15 years, was dismissed by Supreme Court of Japan according to Article 37. After the Takada case, it is considered that dismissing judge should only apply if the accused ask acceleration of a trial.

=== New Zealand ===
There is no guaranteed right to a speedy trial in New Zealand. The New Zealand Bill of Rights Act states that persons charged have the right to be tried without undue delay. However the law does not provide a means of enforcing this requirement nor a definition of what constitutes an "undue delay". Under s79(3), the provisions of the Bill of Rights Act cannot be enforced when they relate to "an act or omission of a court."

In 2024, it is estimated that 81% of cases take 15 months to go from initial arrest to trial, with the remaining cases taking longer, with those defendants often waiting many years for their cases to be heard. The extreme length of time required to have a trial has caused an increasing number of people to plead guilty to criminal charges, for which they deny guilt, in order to have their matters resolved sooner.

=== Philippines ===
The Constitution of the Philippines states, "All persons shall have the right to a speedy disposition of their cases before all judicial, quasi-judicial, or administrative bodies."

=== United States ===
In the United States, basic speedy trial rights are protected by the Speedy Trial Clause of the Sixth Amendment to the United States Constitution. For federal charges, the Speedy Trial Act of 1974 applies. The trial must commence within 70 days from the date the information or indictment was filed, or from the date the defendant appears before an officer of the court in which the charge is pending, whichever is later.

The consequences of a speedy trial violation may require that the case be dismissed, although depending upon the circumstances it may be possible for the state to again initiate a criminal charge against a defendant despite a speedy trial violation.

Defendants may waive their right to a speedy trial for the purposes of negotiation.

==== State Law ====
States may offer speedy trial protections in addition to federal protections, which can vary significantly from the rights available under the federal Constitution and in federal courts under the Speedy Trial Act. In June 1776, a "speedy trial" provision was explicitly included in the Virginia Declaration of Rights by George Mason, its principal author.

California's right to a speedy trial is different in several ways from the federal right. In California, the right to a speedy trial attaches as soon as a felony complaint is filed (that is, as soon as the criminal action is initiated), while in federal courts, the right attaches at a later point, in the form of a "formal accusation" by indictment or information. In California, dismissal is automatic for a violation of the state statute implementing the state constitutional right to a speedy trial (Penal Code section 1382); no affirmative showing of prejudice is required. However, where there was no statutory violation but there may have been a state constitutional violation, then an affirmative showing of prejudice is required and the trial court can defer evaluation of a motion to dismiss to the end of trial in order to evaluate whether the evidence presented at trial shows that the defendant suffered actual prejudice from the delay. Unlike the federal constitutional right to a speedy trial, California does not treat a "uncommonly long" delay as giving rise to a presumption of prejudice under its state constitutional right to a speedy trial, meaning the defendant must show actual prejudice in the sense that evidence material to his defense was actually lost or damaged as a result of the delay.

== See also ==
- Law reform
- Judicial reform
- Judicial review
