= Northwest Austin Municipal Utility District No. 1 v. Holder =

- Supreme Court of the United States

Argued April 29, 2009 Decided June 22, 2009
- Full case name: Northwest Austin Municipal Utility District No. 1 v. Eric Holder, Attorney General
- Docket no.: 08-322
- Citations: 557 U.S. 193 (more) 129 S. Ct. 2504; 174 L. Ed. 2d 140; 2009 U.S. LEXIS 4539; 77 U.S.L.W. 4539; 21 Fla. L. Weekly Fed. S 965

Holding
- Section 5 of the Voting Rights Act of 1965 stands, but districts should be better able to "bail out" of it per Section 4(a).

Court membership
- Chief Justice John Roberts Associate Justices John P. Stevens · Antonin Scalia; Anthony Kennedy · David Souter; Clarence Thomas · Ruth Bader Ginsburg; Stephen Breyer · Samuel Alito

Case opinions
- Majority: Roberts, joined by Stevens, Scalia, Kennedy, Souter, Ginsburg, Breyer, Alito
- Concur/dissent: Thomas

Laws applied
- Voting Rights Act of 1965

Northwest Austin Municipal Utility District No. 1 v. Holder, 557 U.S. 193 (2009), was a decision of the United States Supreme Court regarding Section 5 of the Voting Rights Act of 1965, and in particular its requirement that proposed electoral-law changes in certain states must be approved by the federal government. In a 9–0 decision, the Court concluded that the district was eligible to apply for an exemption (bailout) from this section per Section 4(a), because the definition of "political subdivision" in Section 14(c)(2) included a district of this nature. In an 8–1 opinion, the Court declined to rule on the constitutionality of that provision, citing the principle of constitutional avoidance.

== Background ==
The appellant, Northwest Austin Municipal Utility District No. 1, is a small utility district located northwest of Austin, Texas. The district is run by an elected board.

The District never had any history or claims of racial discrimination in any of its elections. However, because the district is located in Texas, it was subject to the requirements of §5 of the Voting Rights Act of 1965 (the Act, which applies to states with a history of discrimination, especially in the South given Jim Crow-era laws) and extends to any "political subdivision" within the state.

However, another section of the Act, §4(a), allows a political subdivision to seek "bailout" (i.e., release from the preclearance requirements) if certain conditions are met. The District thus filed suit in the United States District Court for the District of Columbia, seeking bailout under §4(a). The District argued in the alternative that, if §5 were interpreted to render it ineligible for bailout, §5 was unconstitutional.

The District Court rejected both claims. It concluded that bailout under §4(a) is available only to counties, parishes, and subunits that register voters, not to an entity like the district that does not register its own voters. It also concluded that a 2006 amendment extending §5 for 25 years was constitutional.

Arguments were held on April 29, 2009. Chief Justice Roberts and Justice Alito questioned why Congress did not extend §5 to all 50 states.

== Opinion of the Court ==
=== Section I [legal and historical background] ===
In Part A, Roberts described the Fifteenth Amendment's problematic history of enforcement that led to the passage of the Voting Rights Act, much of which consists of a "scheme of stringent remedies aimed at areas where voting discrimination has been most flagrant." These remedies were bolstered by §5, which suspended any change in state election procedure until the federal government certified that it neither "has the purpose nor will have the effect of denying or abridging the right to vote on account of race or color." To confine these remedies to areas of flagrant disenfranchisement, the Act applied them only to States that met certain explicit standards. However, recognizing that this coverage formula "might bring within its sweep governmental units not guilty of any unlawful discriminatory voting practices, [Congress] afforded such jurisdictions immediately available protection in the form of ... [a] 'bailout' suit."

Roberts then laid out the requirements of such a suit under D. C. 42 U. S. C. §§1973b. He noted that §§4 and 5 were temporary provisions—they were originally expected to be in effect for only five years. §4(a), 79 Stat. 438. However, Congress reauthorized the Act in 1970 (for 5 years), 1975 (for 7 years), and 1982 (for 25 years); each reauthorization was litigated as unconstitutional, and each time the Supreme Court upheld its constitutionality. Most recently, in 2006, Congress extended §5 for yet another 25 years. It was this latest extension that was now before the court.

Part B characterized the procedural history of the District's suit.

Text of Section I

The Fifteenth Amendment promises that the "right of citizens of the United States to vote shall not be denied or abridged ... on account of race, color, or previous condition of servitude." U. S. Const., Amdt. 15, §1. In addition to that self-executing right, the Amendment also gives Congress the "power to enforce this article by appropriate legislation." §2. The first century of congressional enforcement of the Amendment, however, can only be regarded as a failure. Early enforcement Acts were inconsistently applied and repealed with the rise of Jim Crow. South Carolina v. Katzenbach, 383 U. S. 301, 310 (1966); A. Keyssar, The Right to Vote 105-111 (2000). Another series of enforcement statutes in the 1950s and 1960s depended on individual lawsuits filed by the Department of Justice. But litigation is slow and expensive, and the States were creative in "contriving new rules" to continue violating the Fifteenth Amendment "in the face of adverse federal court decrees." Katzenbach, supra, at 335; Riley v. Kennedy, 553 U. S. ___, ___ (2008) (slip op., at 2).

Congress responded with the Voting Rights Act. Section 2 of the Act operates nationwide; as it exists today, that provision forbids any "standard, practice, or procedure" that "results in a denial or abridgment of the right of any citizen of the United States to vote on account of race or color." 42 U. S. C. §1973(a). Section 2 is not at issue in this case.

The remainder of the Act constitutes a "scheme of stringent remedies aimed at areas where voting discrimination has been most flagrant." Katzenbach, supra, at 315. Rather than continuing to depend on case-by-case litigation, the Act directly pre-empted the most powerful tools of black disenfranchisement in the covered areas. All literacy tests and similar voting qualifications were abolished by §4 of the Act. Voting Rights Act of 1965, §§4(a)-(d), 79 Stat. 438-439. Although such tests may have been facially neutral, they were easily manipulated to keep blacks from voting. The Act also empowered federal examiners to override state determinations about who was eligible to vote. §§ 6, 7, 9, 13, id., at 439-442, 444-445.

These two remedies were bolstered by §5, which suspended all changes in state election procedure until they were submitted to and approved by a three-judge Federal District Court in Washington, D. C., or the Attorney General. Id., at 439, codified as amended at 42 U. S. C. §1973c(a). Such preclearance is granted only if the change neither "has the purpose nor will have the effect of denying or abridging the right to vote on account of race or color." Ibid. We have interpreted the requirements of §5 to apply not only to the ballot-access rights guaranteed by §4, but to drawing district lines as well. Allen v. State Bd. of Elections, 393 U. S. 544, 564-565 (1969).

To confine these remedies to areas of flagrant disenfranchisement, the Act applied them only to States that had used a forbidden test or device in November 1964, and had less than 50% voter registration or turnout in the 1964 Presidential election. §4(b), 79 Stat. 438. Congress recognized that the coverage formula it had adopted "might bring within its sweep governmental units not guilty of any unlawful discriminatory voting practices." Briscoe v. Bell, 432 U. S. 404, 411 (1977). It therefore "afforded such jurisdictions immediately available protection in the form of ... [a] 'bailout' suit." Ibid.

To bail out under the current provision, a jurisdiction must seek a declaratory judgment from a three-judge District Court in Washington, D. C. 42 U. S. C. §§1973b(a)(1), 1973c(a). It must show that for the previous 10 years it has not used any forbidden voting test, has not been subject to any valid objection under §5, and has not been found liable for other voting rights violations; it must also show that it has "engaged in constructive efforts to eliminate intimidation and harassment" of voters, and similar measures. §§1973b(a)(1)(A)-(F). The Attorney General can consent to entry of judgment in favor of bailout if the evidence warrants it, though other interested parties are allowed to intervene in the declaratory judgment action. §1973b(a)(9). There are other restrictions: To bail out, a covered jurisdiction must show that every jurisdiction in its territory has complied with all of these requirements. §1973b(a)(3). The District Court also retains continuing jurisdiction over a successful bailout suit for 10 years, and may reinstate coverage if any violation is found. §1973b(a)(5).

As enacted, §§4 and 5 of the Voting Rights Act were temporary provisions. They were expected to be in effect for only five years. §4(a), 79 Stat. 438. We upheld the temporary Voting Rights Act of 1965 as an appropriate exercise of congressional power in Katzenbach, explaining that "[t]he constitutional propriety of the Voting Rights Act of 1965 must be judged with reference to the historical experience which it reflects." 383 U. S., at 308. We concluded that the problems Congress faced when it passed the Act were so dire that "exceptional conditions [could] justify legislative measures not otherwise appropriate." Id., at 334-335 (citing Home Building & Loan Assn. v. Blaisdell, 290 U. S. 398 (1934), and Wilson v. New, 243 U. S. 332 (1917)).

Congress reauthorized the Act in 1970 (for 5 years), 1975 (for 7 years), and 1982 (for 25 years). The coverage formula remained the same, based on the use of voting-eligibility tests and the rate of registration and turnout among all voters, but the pertinent dates for assessing these criteria moved from 1964 to include 1968 and eventually 1972. 42 U. S. C. §1973b(b). We upheld each of these reauthorizations against constitutional challenges, finding that circumstances continued to justify the provisions. Georgia v. United States, 411 U. S. 526 (1973); City of Rome v. United States, 446 U. S. 156 (1980); Lopez v. Monterey County, 525 U. S. 266 (1999). Most recently, in 2006, Congress extended §5 for yet another 25 years. Fannie Lou Hamer, Rosa Parks, and Coretta Scott King Voting Rights Act Reauthorization and Amendments Act of 2006, 120 Stat. 577. The 2006 Act retained 1972 as the last baseline year for triggering coverage under §5. It is that latest extension that is now before us.

B

Northwest Austin Municipal Utility District Number One was created in 1987 to deliver city services to residents of a portion of Travis County, Texas. It is governed by a board of five members, elected to staggered terms of four years. The district does not register voters but is responsible for its own elections; for administrative reasons, those elections are run by Travis County. Because the district is located in Texas, it is subject to the obligations of §5, although there is no evidence that it has ever discriminated on the basis of race.

The district filed suit in the District Court for the District of Columbia, seeking relief under the statute's bailout provisions and arguing in the alternative that, if interpreted to render the district ineligible for bailout, §5 was unconstitutional. The three-judge District Court rejected both claims. Under the statute, only a "State or political subdivision" is permitted to seek bailout, 42 U. S. C. §1973b(a)(1)(A), and the court concluded that the district was not a political subdivision because that term includes only "counties, parishes, and voter-registering subunits," Northwest Austin Municipal Util. Dist. No. One v. Mukasey, 573 F. Supp. 2d 221, 232 (2008). Turning to the district's constitutional challenge, the court concluded that the 25-year extension of §5 was constitutional both because "Congress ... rationally concluded that extending [§]5 was necessary to protect minorities from continued racial discrimination in voting" and because "the 2006 Amendment qualifies as a congruent and proportional response to the continuing problem of racial discrimination in voting." Id., at 283. We noted probable jurisdiction, 555 U. S. ___ (2009), and now reverse.

=== Section II [Constitutional claim] ===
In Section II, Justice Roberts acknowledged the "undeniable" historic accomplishments of the Voting Rights Act. However, the Act "now raises serious constitutional concerns." In particular, §5, "which authorizes federal intrusion into sensitive areas of state and local policymaking, imposes substantial 'federalism costs,' " costs which have caused Members of this Court to express serious misgivings about the constitutionality of §5. Meanwhile, some of the conditions that the Court relied upon when it previously upheld this statutory scheme have unquestionably improved. "Those improvements are no doubt due in significant part to the Voting Rights Act itself, and stand as a monument to its success," but the Act imposes current burdens and must be justified by current needs. The Act also differentiates between the States in ways that may no longer be justified.

The Court recognizes that judging the constitutionality of an Act of Congress is "the gravest and most delicate duty that this Court is called upon to perform." The District Court found that Congress's contributions to the record documented continuing racial discrimination, and that §5 deterred discriminatory changes. The Court will not shrink from its duty "as the bulwark of a limited Constitution against legislative encroachments," but "[i]t is... well established. . . that normally the Court will not decide a constitutional question if there is some other ground upon which to dispose of the case." Here, the district does provide such other grounds: it raises a statutory claim that it is eligible to bail out under §§4 and 5. The existence of this claim invokes this principle of "Constitutional avoidance," as characterized in Escambia County v. McMillan.

The Court disagreed with Justice Thomas's argument that this principle has no pertinence here. He contends that even if the Court resolved the district's statutory argument in its favor, it would still have to reach the constitutional question, because the district's statutory argument would not afford it all the relief it seeks. However, the district expressly describes its constitutional challenge to §5 as being "in the alternative" to its statutory argument. The district's counsel confirmed this at oral argument.

Text of Section II

The historic accomplishments of the Voting Rights Act are undeniable. When it was first passed, unconstitutional discrimination was rampant and the "registration of voting-age whites ran roughly 50 percentage points or more ahead" of black registration in many covered States. Katzenbach, supra, at 313; H. R. Rep. No. 109-478, p. 12 (2006). Today, the registration gap between white and black voters is in single digits in the covered States; in some of those States, blacks now register and vote at higher rates than whites. Id., at 12-13. Similar dramatic improvements have occurred for other racial minorities. Id., at 18-20. "[M]any of the first generation barriers to minority voter registration and voter turnout that were in place prior to the [Voting Rights Act] have been eliminated." Id., at 12; Bartlett v. Strickland, 556 U. S. 1, ___ (2009) (slip op., at 5) (plurality opinion) ("Passage of the Voting Rights Act of 1965 was an important step in the struggle to end discriminatory treatment of minorities who seek to exercise one of the most fundamental rights of our citizens: the right to vote").

At the same time, §5, "which authorizes federal intrusion into sensitive areas of state and local policymaking, imposes substantial 'federalism costs.' " Lopez, supra, at 282 (quoting Miller v. Johnson, 515 U. S. 900, 926 (1995)). These federalism costs have caused Members of this Court to express serious misgivings about the constitutionality of §5. Katzenbach, 383 U. S., at 358-362 (Black, J., concurring and dissenting); Allen, 393 U. S., at 586, n. 4 (Harlan, J., concurring in part and dissenting in part); Georgia, supra, at 545 (Powell, J., dissenting); City of Rome, 446 U. S., at 209-221 (Rehnquist, J., dissenting); id., at 200-206 (Powell, J., dissenting); Lopez, 525 U. S., at 293-298 (Thomas, J., dissenting); id., at 288 (Kennedy, J., concurring in judgment).

Section 5 goes beyond the prohibition of the Fifteenth Amendment by suspending all changes to state election law--however innocuous--until they have been precleared by federal authorities in Washington, D. C. The preclearance requirement applies broadly, NAACP v. Hampton County Election Comm'n, 470 U. S. 166, 175-176 (1985), and in particular to every political subdivision in a covered State, no matter how small, United States v. Sheffield Bd. of Comm'rs, 435 U. S. 110, 117-118 (1978).

Some of the conditions that we relied upon in upholding this statutory scheme in Katzenbach and City of Rome have unquestionably improved. Things have changed in the South. Voter turnout and registration rates now approach parity. Blatantly discriminatory evasions of federal decrees are rare. And minority candidates hold office at unprecedented levels. See generally H. R. Rep. No. 109-478, at 12-18.

These improvements are no doubt due in significant part to the Voting Rights Act itself, and stand as a monument to its success. Past success alone, however, is not adequate justification to retain the preclearance requirements. See Issacharoff, Is Section 5 of the Voting Rights Act a Victim of Its Own Success? 104 Colum. L. Rev. 1710 (2004). It may be that these improvements are insufficient and that conditions continue to warrant preclearance under the Act. But the Act imposes current burdens and must be justified by current needs.

The Act also differentiates between the States, despite our historic tradition that all the States enjoy "equal sovereignty." United States v. Louisiana, 363 U. S. 1, 16 (1960) (citing Lessee of Pollard v. Hagan, 3 How. 212, 223 (1845)); see also Texas v. White, 7 Wall. 700, 725-726 (1869). Distinctions can be justified in some cases. "The doctrine of the equality of States ... does not bar ... remedies for local evils which have subsequently appeared." Katzenbach, supra, at 328-329 (emphasis added). But a departure from the fundamental principle of equal sovereignty requires a showing that a statute's disparate geographic coverage is sufficiently related to the problem that it targets.

These federalism concerns are underscored by the argument that the preclearance requirements in one State would be unconstitutional in another. See Georgia v. Ashcroft, 539 U. S. 461, 491-492 (2003) (Kennedy, J., concurring) ("Race cannot be the predominant factor in redistricting under our decision in Miller v. Johnson, 515 U. S. 900 (1995). Yet considerations of race that would doom a redistricting plan under the Fourteenth Amendment or §2 seem to be what save it under §5"). Additional constitutional concerns are raised in saying that this tension between §§2 and 5 must persist in covered jurisdictions and not elsewhere.

The evil that §5 is meant to address may no longer be concentrated in the jurisdictions singled out for preclearance. The statute's coverage formula is based on data that is now more than 35 years old, and there is considerable evidence that it fails to account for current political conditions. For example, the racial gap in voter registration and turnout is lower in the States originally covered by §5 than it is nationwide. E. Blum & L. Campbell, Assessment of Voting Rights Progress in Jurisdictions Covered Under Section Five of the Voting Rights Act 3-6 (American Enterprise Institute, 2006). Congress heard warnings from supporters of extending §5 that the evidence in the record did not address "systematic differences between the covered and the non-covered areas of the United States[,] ... and, in fact, the evidence that is in the record suggests that there is more similarity than difference." The Continuing Need for Section 5 Pre-Clearance: Hearing before the Senate Committee on the Judiciary, 109th Cong., 2d Sess., 10 (2006) (statement of Richard H. Pildes); see also Persily, The Promise and Pitfalls of the New Voting Rights Act, 117 Yale L. J. 174, 208 (2007) ("The most one can say in defense of the [coverage] formula is that it is the best of the politically feasible alternatives or that changing the formula would ... disrupt settled expectations").

The parties do not agree on the standard to apply in deciding whether, in light of the foregoing concerns, Congress exceeded its Fifteenth Amendment enforcement power in extending the preclearance requirements. The district argues that " '[t]here must be a congruence and proportionality between the injury to be prevented or remedied and the means adopted to that end,' " Brief for Appellant 31, quoting City of Boerne v. Flores, 521 U. S. 507, 520 (1997); the Federal Government asserts that it is enough that the legislation be a " 'rational means to effectuate the constitutional prohibition,' " Brief for Federal Appellee 6, quoting Katzenbach, supra, at 324. That question has been extensively briefed in this case, but we need not resolve it. The Act's preclearance requirements and its coverage formula raise serious constitutional questions under either test.

In assessing those questions, we are keenly mindful of our institutional role. We fully appreciate that judging the constitutionality of an Act of Congress is "the gravest and most delicate duty that this Court is called on to perform." Blodgett v. Holden, 275 U. S. 142, 147-148 (1927) (Holmes, J., concurring). "The Congress is a coequal branch of government whose Members take the same oath we do to uphold the Constitution of the United States." Rostker v. Goldberg, 453 U. S. 57, 64 (1981). The Fifteenth Amendment empowers "Congress," not the Court, to determine in the first instance what legislation is needed to enforce it. Congress amassed a sizable record in support of its decision to extend the preclearance requirements, a record the District Court determined "document[ed] contemporary racial discrimination in covered states." 573 F. Supp. 2d, at 265. The District Court also found that the record "demonstrat[ed] that section 5 prevents discriminatory voting changes" by "quietly but effectively deterring discriminatory changes." Id., at 264.

We will not shrink from our duty "as the bulwar[k] of a limited constitution against legislative encroachments," The Federalist No. 78, p. 526 (J. Cooke ed. 1961) (A. Hamilton), but "[i]t is a well-established principle governing the prudent exercise of this Court's jurisdiction that normally the Court will not decide a constitutional question if there is some other ground upon which to dispose of the case," Escambia County v. McMillan, 466 U. S. 48, 51 (1984) (per curiam). Here, the district also raises a statutory claim that it is eligible to bail out under §§4 and 5. Justice Thomas argues that the principle of constitutional avoidance has no pertinence here. He contends that even if we resolve the district's statutory argument in its favor, we would still have to reach the constitutional question, because the district's statutory argument would not afford it all the relief it seeks. Post, at 1-3 (opinion concurring in judgment in part and dissenting in part).

We disagree. The district expressly describes its constitutional challenge to §5 as being "in the alternative" to its statutory argument. See Brief for Appellant 64 ("[T]he Court should reverse the judgment of the district court and render judgment that the district is entitled to use the bailout procedure or, in the alternative, that §5 cannot be constitutionally applied to the district"). The district's counsel confirmed this at oral argument. See Tr. of Oral Arg. 14 ("[Question:] [D]o you acknowledge that if we find in your favor on the bailout point we need not reach the constitutional point? [Answer:] I do acknowledge that"). We therefore turn to the district's statutory argument.

=== Section III [Statutory claim] ===
In Section III, Roberts addressed the district's narrower argument that it is eligible for a bailout under the requirements of §§4 and 5. The question hinged on the intended definition of the term "[P]olitical subdivision" as used in §14(c)(2). The Court concluded that "all political subdivisions--not only those described in §14(c)(2)--are eligible to file a bailout suit," thus overturning the district court.

- The Act must be interpreted to permit all political subdivisions, including the district, to seek to bail out from the preclearance requirements. It is undisputed that the district is a "political subdivision" in the ordinary sense, but the Act also provides a narrower definition in §14(c)(2): " '[P]olitical subdivision' shall mean any county or parish, except that where registration for voting is not conducted under the supervision of a county or parish, the term shall include any other subdivision of a State which conducts registration for voting." The court below concluded that the district did not qualify for §4(a) bailout under this definition, but specific precedent, the Act's structure, and underlying constitutional concerns compel a broader reading.
- This Court has already established that §14(c)(2)'s definition does not apply to the term "political subdivision" in §5's preclearance provision. Rather, the "definition was intended to operate only for purposes of determining which political units in nondesignated States may be separately designated for coverage under §4(b)." "[O]nce a State has been [so] designated..., [the] definition... has no operative significance in determining [§5's] reach." In light of these decisions, §14(c)(2)'s definition should not constrict the availability of bailout either.
  - The Government responds that any such argument is foreclosed by City of Rome v. United States. In 1982, however, Congress expressly repudiated City of Rome by amending the Act to allow political subdivisions of a state to seek bailout, even if the state itself was ineligible for bailout. Thus, City of Rome's logic is no longer applicable.
  - The Government's contention that the district is subject to §5 under Sheffield not because it is a "political subdivision" but because it is a "State" is counterintuitive and similarly untenable after the 1982 amendments. The Government's contrary interpretation has helped to render the bailout provision all but a nullity. Since 1982, only 17 jurisdictions—out of the more than 12,000 covered political subdivisions—have successfully bailed out of the Act. It is unlikely that Congress intended the provision to have such limited effect.
Text of Section III

Section 4(b) of the Voting Rights Act authorizes a bailout suit by a "State or political subdivision." 42 U. S. C. §1973b(a)(1)(A). There is no dispute that the district is a political subdivision of the State of Texas in the ordinary sense of the term. See, e.g., Black's Law Dictionary 1197 (8th ed. 2004) ("A division of a state that exists primarily to discharge some function of local government"). The district was created under Texas law with "powers of government" relating to local utilities and natural resources. Tex. Const., Art. XVI, §59(b); Tex. Water Code Ann. §54.011 (West 2002); see also Bennett v. Brown Cty. Water Improvement Dist. No. 1, 272 S. W. 2d 498, 500 (Tex. 1954) ("[W]ater improvement district[s] ... are held to be political subdivisions of the State" (internal quotation marks omitted)).

The Act, however, also provides a narrower statutory definition in §14(c)(2): " '[P]olitical subdivision' shall mean any county or parish, except that where registration for voting is not conducted under the supervision of a county or parish, the term shall include any other subdivision of a State which conducts registration for voting." 42 U. S. C. §1973l(c)(2). The District Court concluded that this definition applied to the bailout provision in §4(a), and that the district did not qualify, since it is not a county or parish and does not conduct its own voter registration.

"Statutory definitions control the meaning of statutory words, of course, in the usual case. But this is an unusual case." Lawson v. Suwannee Fruit & S. S. Co., 336 U. S. 198, 201 (1949); see also Farmers Reservoir & Irrigation Co. v. McComb, 337 U. S. 755, 764 (1949); Philko Aviation, Inc. v. Shacket, 462 U. S. 406, 412 (1983). Were the scope of §4(a) considered in isolation from the rest of the statute and our prior cases, the District Court's approach might well be correct. But here specific precedent, the structure of the Voting Rights Act, and underlying constitutional concerns compel a broader reading of the bailout provision.

Importantly, we do not write on a blank slate. Our decisions have already established that the statutory definition in §14(c)(2) does not apply to every use of the term "political subdivision" in the Act. We have, for example, concluded that the definition does not apply to the preclearance obligation of §5. According to its text, §5 applies only "[w]henever a [covered] State or political subdivision" enacts or administers a new voting practice. Yet in Sheffield Bd. of Comm'rs, 435 U. S. 110, we rejected the argument by a Texas city that it was neither a State nor a political subdivision as defined in the Act, and therefore did not need to seek preclearance of a voting change. The dissent agreed with the city, pointing out that the city did not meet the statutory definition of "political subdivision" and therefore could not be covered. Id., at 141-144 (opinion of Stevens, J.). The majority, however, relying on the purpose and structure of the Act, concluded that the "definition was intended to operate only for purposes of determining which political units in nondesignated States may be separately designated for coverage under §4(b)." Id., at 128-129; see also id., at 130, n. 18 ("Congress's exclusive objective in §14(c)(2) was to limit the jurisdictions which may be separately designated for coverage under §4(b)").

We reaffirmed this restricted scope of the statutory definition the next Term in Dougherty County Bd. of Ed. v. White, 439 U. S. 32 (1978). There, a school board argued that because "it d[id] not meet the definition" of political subdivision in §14(c)(2), it "d[id] not come within the purview of §5." Id., at 43, 44. We responded:

"This contention is squarely foreclosed by our decision last Term in [Sheffield]. There, we expressly rejected the suggestion that the city of Sheffield was beyond the ambit of §5 because it did not itself register voters and hence was not a political subdivision as the term is defined in §14(c)(2) of the Act. ... [O]nce a State has been designated for coverage, §14(c)(2)'s definition of political subdivision has no operative significance in determining the reach of §5." Id., at 44 (internal quotation marks omitted).

According to these decisions, then, the statutory definition of "political subdivision" in §14(c)(2) does not apply to every use of the term "political subdivision" in the Act. Even the intervenors who oppose the district's bailout concede, for example, that the definition should not apply to §2, which bans racial discrimination in voting by "any State or political subdivision," 42 U. S. C. §1973(a). See Brief for Intervenor-Appellee Texas State Conference of NAACP Branches et al. 17 (citing Smith v. Salt River Project Agricultural Improvement and Power Dist., 109 F. 3d 586, 592-593 (CA9 1997)); see also United States v. Uvalde Consol. Independent School Dist., 625 F. 2d 547, 554 (CA5 1980) ("[T]he Supreme Court has held that this definition [in §14(c)(2)] limits the meaning of the phrase 'State or political subdivision' only when it appears in certain parts of the Act, and that it does not confine the phrase as used elsewhere in the Act"). In light of our holdings that the statutory definition does not constrict the scope of preclearance required by §5, the district argues, it only stands to reason that the definition should not constrict the availability of bailout from those preclearance requirements either.

The Government responds that any such argument is foreclosed by our interpretation of the statute in City of Rome, 446 U. S. 156. There, it argues, we made clear that the discussion of political subdivisions in Sheffield was dictum, and "specifically held that a 'city is not a "political subdivision" for purposes of §4(a) bailout.' " Brief for Federal Appellee 14 (quoting City of Rome, supra, at 168).

Even if that is what City of Rome held, the premises of its statutory holding did not survive later changes in the law. In City of Rome we rejected the city's attempt to bail out from coverage under §5, concluding that "political units of a covered jurisdiction cannot independently bring a §4(a) bailout action." 446 U. S., at 167. We concluded that the statute as then written authorized a bailout suit only by a "State" subject to the coverage formula, or a "political subdivision with respect to which [coverage] determinations have been made as a separate unit," id., at 164, n. 2 (quoting 42 U. S. C. §1973b(a) (1976 ed.)); see also 446 U. S., at 163-169. Political subdivisions covered because they were part of a covered State, rather than because of separate coverage determinations, could not separately bail out. As Justice Stevens put it, "[t]he political subdivisions of a covered State" were "not entitled to bail out in a piecemeal fashion." Id., at 192 (concurring opinion).

In 1982, however, Congress expressly repudiated City of Rome and instead embraced "piecemeal" bailout. As part of an overhaul of the bailout provision, Congress amended the Voting Rights Act to expressly provide that bailout was also available to "political subdivisions" in a covered State, "though [coverage] determinations were not made with respect to such subdivision as a separate unit." Voting Rights Act Amendments of 1982, 96 Stat. 131, codified at 42 U. S. C. §1973b(a)(1) (emphasis added). In other words, Congress decided that a jurisdiction covered because it was within a covered State need not remain covered for as long as the State did. If the subdivision met the bailout requirements, it could bail out, even if the State could not. In light of these amendments, our logic for denying bailout in City of Rome is no longer applicable to the Voting Rights Act--if anything, that logic compels the opposite conclusion.

Bailout and preclearance under §5 are now governed by a principle of symmetry. "Given the Court's decision in Sheffield that all political units in a covered State are to be treated for §5 purposes as though they were 'political subdivisions' of that State, it follows that they should also be treated as such for purposes of §4(a)'s bailout provisions." City of Rome, supra, at 192 (Stevens, J., concurring).

The Government contends that this reading of Sheffield is mistaken, and that the district is subject to §5 under our decision in Sheffield not because it is a "political subdivision" but because it is a "State." That would mean it could bail out only if the whole State could bail out.

The assertion that the district is a State is at least counterintuitive. We acknowledge, however, that there has been much confusion over why Sheffield held the city in that case to be covered by the text of §5. See City of Rome, 446 U. S., at 168-169; id., at 192 (Stevens, J., concurring); see also Uvalde Consol. Independent School Dist. v. United States, 451 U. S. 1002, 1004, n. 4 (1981) (Rehnquist, J., dissenting from denial of certiorari) ("[T]his Court has not yet settled on the proper construction of the term 'political subdivision' ").

But after the 1982 amendments, the Government's position is untenable. If the district is considered the State, and therefore necessarily subject to preclearance so long as Texas is covered, then the same must be true of all other subdivisions of the State, including counties. That would render even counties unable to seek bailout so long as their State was covered. But that is the very restriction the 1982 amendments overturned. Nobody denies that counties in a covered State can seek bailout, as several of them have. See Voting Rights Act: Section 5 of the Act--History, Scope, and Purpose: Hearing Before the Subcommittee on the Constitution of the House Committee on the Judiciary, 109th Cong., 1st Sess., 2599-2834 (2005) (detailing bailouts). Because such piecemeal bailout is now permitted, it cannot be true that §5 treats every governmental unit as the State itself.

The Government's contrary interpretation has helped to render the bailout provision all but a nullity. Since 1982, only 17 jurisdictions--out of the more than 12,000 covered political subdivisions--have successfully bailed out of the Act. App. to Brief for Jurisdictions That Have Bailed Out as Amici Curiae 3; Dept. of Commerce, Bureau of Census, 2002 Census of Governments, Vol. 1, No. 1, pp. 1, 22-60. It is unlikely that Congress intended the provision to have such limited effect. See United States v. Hayes, 555 U. S. ___, ____ (2009) (slip op., at 10).

We therefore hold that all political subdivisions--not only those described in §14(c)(2)--are eligible to file a bailout suit.

== Concurrence in part and dissent in part ==
Justice Clarence Thomas concurred in part and dissented in part.

He concurred with the judgment that the District should be able to file a bailout suit. However, he dissented from the majority's decision not to address the constitutionality of §5 and argued that §5 is no longer constitutional (a position he would take once again in Shelby County v. Holder when the issue of §5's constitutionality would once again be raised).

=== Section I ===
Dissent Part I

The doctrine of constitutional avoidance factors heavily in the Court's conclusion that appellant is eligible for bailout as a "political subdivision" under §4(a) of the VRA. See ante, at 11. Regardless of the Court's resolution of the statutory question, I am in full agreement that this case raises serious questions concerning the constitutionality of §5 of the VRA. But, unlike the Court, I do not believe that the doctrine of constitutional avoidance is applicable here. The ultimate relief sought in this case is not bailout eligibility--it is bailout itself. See First Amended Complaint in No. 06-1384 (DDC), p. 8, Record, Doc. 83 ("Plaintiff requests the Court to declare that the district has met the bail-out requirements of §4 of the [VRA] and that the preclearance requirements of §5 ... no longer apply to the district; or, in the alternative, that §5 of the Act as applied to the district is an unconstitutional overextension of Congress's enforcement power to remedy past violations of the Fifteenth Amendment").

Eligibility for bailout turns on the statutory question addressed by the Court--the proper definition of "political subdivision" in the bailout clauses of §4(a) of the VRA. Entitlement to bailout, however, requires a covered "political subdivision" to submit substantial evidence indicating that it is not engaging in "discrimination in voting on account of race," see 42 U. S. C. §1973b(a)(3). The Court properly declines to give appellant bailout because appellant has not yet proved its compliance with the statutory requirements for such relief. See §§1973b(a)(1)-(3). In fact, the record below shows that appellant's factual entitlement to bailout is a vigorously contested issue. See, e.g., NAACP's Statement of Undisputed Material Facts in No. 06-1384 (DDC), pp. 490-492, Record, Doc. 100; Attorney General's Statement of Uncontested Material Facts in No. 06-1384 (DDC), ¶¶19, 59, Record, Doc. 98. Given its resolution of the statutory question, the Court has thus correctly remanded the case for resolution of appellant's factual entitlement to bailout. See ante, at 16.

But because the Court is not in a position to award appellant bailout, adjudication of the constitutionality of §5, in my view, cannot be avoided. "Traditionally, the avoidance canon was not a doctrine under which courts read statutes to avoid mere constitutional doubts. Instead, it commanded courts, when faced with two plausible constructions of a statute--one constitutional and the other unconstitutional--to choose the constitutional reading." Clark v. Martinez, 543 U. S. 371, 395 (2005) (Thomas, J., dissenting). To the extent that constitutional avoidance is a worthwhile tool of statutory construction, it is because it allows a court to dispose of an entire case on grounds that do not require the court to pass on a statute's constitutionality. See Ashwander v. TVA, 297 U. S. 288, 347 (1936) (Brandeis, J., concurring) ("The Court will not pass upon a constitutional question although properly presented by the record, if there is also some other ground upon which the case may be disposed of"); see also, e.g., Mayor of Philadelphia v. Educational Equality League, 415 U. S. 605, 629 (1974). The doctrine "avoids decision of constitutional questions where possible, and it permits one lawsuit, rather than two, to resolve the entire controversy." C. Wright, The Law of Federal Courts §19, p. 104 (4th ed. 1983). Absent a determination that appellant is not just eligible for bailout, but is entitled to it, this case will not have been entirely disposed of on a nonconstitutional ground. Cf. Tr. of Oral Arg. 14 ("[I]f the Court were to give us bailout ... the Court might choose on its own not to reach the constitutional issues because we would receive relief"). Invocation of the doctrine of constitutional avoidance is therefore inappropriate in this case.

The doctrine of constitutional avoidance is also unavailable here because an interpretation of §4(a) that merely makes more political subdivisions eligible for bailout does not render §5 constitutional and the Court notably does not suggest otherwise. See Clark, supra, at 396 (Thomas, J., dissenting). Bailout eligibility is a distant prospect for most covered jurisdictions. To obtain bailout a covered jurisdiction must satisfy numerous objective criteria. It must show that during the previous 10 years: (A) no "test or device has been used within such State or political subdivision for the purpose or with the effect of denying or abridging the right to vote on account of race or color"; (B) "no final judgment of any court of the United States ... has determined that denials or abridgments of the right to vote on account of race or color have occurred anywhere in the territory of" the covered jurisdiction; (C) "no Federal examiners or observers ... have been assigned to" the covered jurisdiction; (D) the covered jurisdiction has fully complied with §5; and (E) "the Attorney General has not interposed any objection (that has not been overturned by a final judgment of a court) and no declaratory judgment has been denied under [§5]." §§1973b(a)(1)(A)-(E). The jurisdiction also has the burden of presenting "evidence of minority participation, including evidence of the levels of minority group registration and voting, changes in such levels over time, and disparities between minority-group and non-minority-group participation." §1973b(a)(2).

These extensive requirements may be difficult to satisfy, see Brief for Georgia Governor Sonny Purdue as Amicus Curiae 20-26, but at least they are objective. The covered jurisdiction seeking bailout must also meet subjective criteria: it must "(i) have eliminated voting procedures and methods of election which inhibit or dilute equal access to the electoral process; (ii) have engaged in constructive efforts to eliminate intimidation and harassment of persons exercising rights protected [under the Act]; and (iii) have engaged in other constructive efforts, such as expanded opportunity for convenient registration and voting for every person of voting age and the appointment of minority persons as election officials throughout the jurisdiction and at all stages of the election and registration process." §§1973b(a)(1)(F)(i)-(iii).

As a result, a covered jurisdiction meeting each of the objective conditions could nonetheless be denied bailout because it has not, in the subjective view of the United States District Court for the District of Columbia, engaged in sufficiently "constructive efforts" to expand voting opportunities, §1973b(a)(1)(F)(iii). Congress, of course, has complete authority to set the terms of bailout. But its promise of a bailout opportunity has, in the great majority of cases, turned out to be no more than a mirage. As the Court notes, only a handful "of the more than 12,000 covered political subdivisions ... have successfully bailed out of the Act." Ante, at 16;1 see Williamson, The 1982 Amendments to the Voting Rights Act: A Statutory Analysis of the Revised Bailout Provisions, 62 Wash. U. L. Q. 1, 42 (1984) (explaining that "the conditions for termination of coverage have been made so restrictive that bailout will continue to be impossible for most jurisdictions"). Accordingly, bailout eligibility does not eliminate the issue of §5's constitutionality.

=== Section II ===
Dissent Part II (Section A)

"The government of the United States is one of delegated powers alone. Its authority is defined and limited by the Constitution. All powers not granted to it by that instrument are reserved to the States or the people." United States v. Cruikshank, 92 U. S. 542, 551 (1876); see also U. S. Term Limits, Inc. v. Thornton, 514 U. S. 779, 848 (1995) (Thomas, J., dissenting). In the specific area of voting rights, this Court has consistently recognized that the Constitution gives the States primary authority over the structuring of electoral systems. See, e.g., White v. Weiser, 412 U. S. 783, 795 (1973); Burns v. Richardson, 384 U. S. 73, 84-85 (1966). "No function is more essential to the separate and independent existence of the States and their governments than the power to determine within the limits of the Constitution the qualifications of their own voters for state, county, and municipal offices and the nature of their own machinery for filling local public offices." Oregon v. Mitchell, 400 U. S. 112, 125 (1970) (opinion of Black, J.).

State autonomy with respect to the machinery of self-government defines the States as sovereign entities rather than mere provincial outposts subject to every dictate of a central governing authority. See U. S. Const., Amdt. 10 ("The powers not delegated to the United States by the Constitution, nor prohibited by it to the States, are reserved to the States respectively, or to the people"); see also Alden v. Maine, 527 U. S. 706, 713 (1999). In the main, the "Framers of the Constitution intended the States to keep for themselves, as provided in the Tenth Amendment, the power to regulate elections." Gregory v. Ashcroft, 501 U. S. 452, 461-462 (1991) (internal quotation marks omitted).

To be sure, state authority over local elections is not absolute under the Constitution. The Fifteenth Amendment guarantees that the "right of citizens of the United States to vote shall not be denied or abridged by the United States or by any State on account of race, color, or previous condition of servitude," §1, and it grants Congress the authority to "enforce" these rights "by appropriate legislation," §2. The Fifteenth Amendment thus renders unconstitutional any federal or state law that would limit a citizen's access to the ballot on one of the three bases enumerated in the Amendment. See Mobile v. Bolden, 446 U. S. 55, 65 (1980) (plurality opinion) (the Fifteenth Amendment guards against "purposefully discriminatory denial or abridgment by government of the freedom to vote"). Nonetheless, because States still retain sovereign authority over their election systems, any measure enacted in furtherance of the Fifteenth Amendment must be closely examined to ensure that its encroachment on state authority in this area is limited to the appropriate enforcement of this ban on discrimination.

There is certainly no question that the VRA initially "was passed pursuant to Congress' authority under the Fifteenth Amendment." Lopez v. Monterey County, 525 U. S. 266, 282 (1999). For example, §§2 and 4(a) seek to implement the Fifteenth Amendment's substantive command by creating a private cause of action to enforce §1 of the Fifteenth Amendment, see §1973(a), and by banning discriminatory tests and devices in covered jurisdictions, see §1973b(a); see also City of Lockhart v. United States, 460 U. S. 125, 139 (1983) (Marshall, J., concurring in part and dissenting in part) (explaining that §2 reflects Congress' determination "that voting discrimination was a nationwide problem" that called for a "general prohibition of discriminatory practices"). Other provisions of the VRA also directly enforce the Fifteenth Amendment. See §1973h (elimination of poll taxes that effectively deny certain racial groups the right to vote); §1973i(a) ("No person acting under color of law shall fail or refuse to permit any person to vote who is entitled to vote ... or willfully fail or refuse to tabulate, count, and report such person's vote").

Section 5, however, was enacted for a different purpose: to prevent covered jurisdictions from circumventing the direct prohibitions imposed by provisions such as §§2 and 4(a). See Reno v. Bossier Parish School Bd., 520 U. S. 471, 477 (1997) (explaining that §§2 and 5 "combat different evils" and "impose very different duties upon the States"). Section 5 "was a response to a common practice in some jurisdictions of staying one step ahead of the federal courts by passing new discriminatory voting laws as soon as the old ones had been struck down. That practice had been possible because each new law remained in effect until the Justice Department or private plaintiffs were able to sustain the burden of proving that the new law, too, was discriminatory." Beer v. United States, 425 U. S. 130, 140 (1976) (internal quotation marks omitted).

The rebellion against the enfranchisement of blacks in the wake of ratification of the Fifteenth Amendment illustrated the need for increased federal intervention to protect the right to vote. Almost immediately following Reconstruction, blacks attempting to vote were met with coordinated intimidation and violence. See, e.g., L. McDonald, A Voting Rights Odyssey: Black Enfranchisement in Georgia 34 (2003) ("By 1872, the legislative and executive branches of state government ... were once again firmly in the control of white Democrats, who resorted to a variety of tactics, including fraud, intimidation, and violence, to take away the vote from blacks, despite ratification of the Fifteenth Amendment in 1870 ...").2 A soon-to-be victorious mayoral candidate in Wilmington, North Carolina, for example, urged white voters in an 1898 election-eve speech: "Go to the polls tomorrow and if you find the negro out voting, tell him to leave the polls, and if he refuses kill him; shoot him down in his tracks." S. Tolnay & E. Beck, A Festival of Violence: An Analysis of Southern Lynchings, 1882-1930, p. 67 (1995).

This campaign of violence eventually was supplemented, and in part replaced, by more subtle methods engineered to deny blacks the right to vote. See South Carolina v. Katzenbach, 383 U. S. 301, 310-312 (1966). Literacy tests were particularly effective: "as of 1890 in ... States [with literacy tests], more than two-thirds of the adult Negroes were illiterate while less than one-quarter of the adult whites were unable to read or write," id., at 311, because "[p]rior to the Civil War, most of the slave States made it a crime to teach Negroes how to read or write," see also id., at 311, n. 10.3 Compounding the tests' discriminatory impact on blacks, alternative voter qualification laws such as "grandfather clauses, property qualifications, [and] 'good character' tests" were enacted to protect those whites who were unable to pass the literacy tests. Id., at 311; see also Lopez, supra, at 297 (Thomas, J., dissenting) ("Literacy tests were unfairly administered; whites were given easy questions, and blacks were given more difficult questions, such as the number of bubbles in a soap bar, the news contained in a copy of the Peking Daily, the meaning of obscure passages in state constitutions, and the definition of terms such as habeas corpus" (internal quotation marks omitted)).

The Court had declared many of these "tests and devices" unconstitutional, see Katzenbach, supra, at 311-312, but case-by-case eradication was woefully inadequate to ensure that the franchise extended to all citizens regardless of race, see id., at 328. As a result, enforcement efforts before the enactment of §5 had rendered the right to vote illusory for blacks in the Jim Crow South. Despite the Civil War's bloody purchase of the Fifteenth Amendment, "the reality remained far from the promise." Rice v. Cayetano, 528 U. S. 495, 512-513 (2000); see also R. Wardlaw, Negro Suffrage in Georgia, 1867-1930, p. 34 (Phelps-Stokes Fellowship Studies, No. 11, 1932) ("Southern States were setting out to accomplish an effective nullification of the war measures of Congress").

Thus, by 1965, Congress had every reason to conclude that States with a history of disenfranchising voters based on race would continue to do all they could to evade the constitutional ban on voting discrimination. By that time, race-based voting discrimination had "infected the electoral process in parts of our country for nearly a century." Katzenbach, 383 U. S., at 308. Moreover, the massive scale of disenfranchisement efforts made case-by-case enforcement of the Fifteenth Amendment impossible, if not Sisyphean. See id., at 309 ("Congress concluded that the unsuccessful remedies which it had prescribed in the past would have to be replaced by sterner and more elaborate measures in order to satisfy the clear commands of the Fifteenth Amendment"); Rice, supra, at 513 ("Progress was slow, particularly when litigation had to proceed case by case, district by district, sometimes voter by voter"); Thernstrom, Section 5 of the Voting Rights Act: By Now, a Murky Mess, 5 Geo. J. L. & Pub. Pol'y 41, 44 (2007) ("In 1965, it was perfectly reasonable to believe that any move affecting black enfranchisement in the Deep South was deeply suspect. And only such a punitive measure [as §5] had any hope of forcing the South to let blacks vote" (emphasis in original)).

It was against this backdrop of "historical experience" that §5 was first enacted and upheld against a constitutional challenge. See Katzenbach, supra, at 308. As the Katzenbach Court explained, §5, which applied to those States and political subdivisions that had employed discriminatory tests and devices in the previous Presidential election, see 42 U. S. C. §1973b(b), directly targeted the "insidious and pervasive evil which had been perpetuated in certain parts of our country through unremitting and ingenious defiance of the Constitution." 383 U. S., at 309; see also id., at 329 ("Congress began work with reliable evidence of actual voting discrimination in a great majority of the States and political subdivisions affected by the new remedies of the Act"). According to the Court, it was appropriate to radically interfere with control over local elections only in those jurisdictions with a history of discriminatory disenfranchisement as those were "the geographic areas where immediate action seemed necessary." Id., at 328. The Court believed it was thus "permissible to impose the new remedies" on the jurisdictions covered under §4(b) "at least in the absence of proof that they ha[d] been free of substantial voting discrimination in recent years." Id., at 330.

In upholding §5 in Katzenbach, the Court nonetheless noted that the provision was an "uncommon exercise of congressional power" that would not have been "appropriate" absent the "exceptional conditions" and "unique circumstances" present in the targeted jurisdictions at that particular time. Id., at 334-335. In reaching its decision, the Court thus refused to simply accept Congress' representation that the extreme measure was necessary to enforce the Fifteenth Amendment; rather, it closely reviewed the record compiled by Congress to ensure that §5 was " 'appropriate' " antievasion legislation. See id., at 308. In so doing, the Court highlighted evidence showing that black voter registration rates ran approximately 50 percentage points lower than white voter registration in several States. See id., at 313. It also noted that the registration rate for blacks in Alabama "rose only from 14.2% to 19.4% between 1958 and 1964; in Louisiana it barely inched ahead from 31.7% to 31.8% between 1956 and 1965; and in Mississippi it increased only from 4.4% to 6.4% between 1954 and 1964." Ibid. The Court further observed that voter turnout levels in covered jurisdictions had been at least 12% below the national average in the 1964 Presidential election. See id., at 329-330.

The statistical evidence confirmed Congress' judgment that "the extraordinary stratagem of contriving new rules of various kinds for the sole purpose of perpetuating voting discrimination in the face of adverse federal court decrees" was working and could not be defeated through case-by-case enforcement of the Fifteenth Amendment. Id., at 335. This record also clearly supported Congress' predictive judgment that such "States might try similar maneuvers in the future in order to evade the remedies for voting discrimination contained in the Act itself." Ibid. These stark statistics--in conjunction with the unrelenting use of discriminatory tests and practices that denied blacks the right to vote--constituted sufficient proof of "actual voting discrimination" to uphold the preclearance requirement imposed by §5 on the covered jurisdictions as an appropriate exercise of congressional power under the Fifteenth Amendment. Id., at 330. It was only "[u]nder the compulsion of these unique circumstances [that] Congress responded in a permissibly decisive manner." Id., at 335.
Dissent Part II (Section B)

Several important principles emerge from Katzenbach and the decisions that followed it. First, §5 prohibits more state voting practices than those necessarily encompassed by the explicit prohibition on intentional discrimination found in the text of the Fifteenth Amendment. The explicit command of the Fifteenth Amendment is a prohibition on state practices that in fact deny individuals the right to vote "on account of" race, color, or previous servitude. In contrast, §5 is the quintessential prophylaxis; it "goes beyond the prohibition of the Fifteenth Amendment by suspending all changes to state election law--however innocuous--until they have been precleared by federal authorities in Washington, D. C." Ante, at 7. The Court has freely acknowledged that such legislation is preventative, upholding it based on the view that the Reconstruction Amendments give Congress the power "both to remedy and to deter violation of rights guaranteed thereunder by prohibiting a somewhat broader swath of conduct, including that which is not itself forbidden by the Amendment's text." Kimel v. Florida Bd. of Regents, 528 U. S. 62, 81 (2000) (emphasis added).

Second, because it sweeps more broadly than the substantive command of the Fifteenth Amendment, §5 pushes the outer boundaries of Congress' Fifteenth Amendment enforcement authority. See Miller v. Johnson, 515 U. S. 900, 926 (1995) (detailing the "federalism costs exacted by §5"); Presley v. Etowah County Comm'n, 502 U. S. 491, 500-501 (1992) (describing §5 as "an extraordinary departure from the traditional course of relations between the States and the Federal Government"); City of Rome v. United States, 446 U. S. 156, 200 (1980) (Powell, J., dissenting) ("The preclearance requirement both intrudes on the prerogatives of state and local governments and abridges the voting rights of all citizens in States covered under the Act"); Lopez, 525 U. S., at 293 (Thomas, J., dissenting) ("Section 5 is a unique requirement that exacts significant federalism costs"); ante, at 7 ("[Section] 5, which authorizes federal intrusion into sensitive areas of state and local policymaking, imposes substantial federalism costs " (internal quotation marks omitted)).

Indeed, §5's preclearance requirement is "one of the most extraordinary remedial provisions in an Act noted for its broad remedies. Even the Department of Justice has described it as a 'substantial departure ... from ordinary concepts of our federal system'; its encroachment on state sovereignty is significant and undeniable." United States v. Sheffield Bd. of Comm'rs, 435 U. S. 110, 141 (1978) (Stevens, J., dissenting) (footnote omitted). This "encroachment is especially troubling because it destroys local control of the means of self-government, one of the central values of our polity." City of Rome, supra, at 201 (Powell, J., dissenting). More than 40 years after its enactment, this intrusion has become increasingly difficult to justify.

Third, to accommodate the tension between the constitutional imperatives of the Fifteenth and Tenth Amendments--a balance between allowing the Federal Government to patrol state voting practices for discrimination and preserving the States' significant interest in self-determination--the constitutionality of §5 has always depended on the proven existence of intentional discrimination so extensive that elimination of it through case-by-case enforcement would be impossible. See Katzenbach, 383 U. S., at 308 ("Before enacting the measure, Congress explored with great care the problem of racial discrimination in voting"); Katzenbach v. Morgan, 384 U. S. 641, 667 (1966) (Harlan, J., dissenting) ("Congress made a detailed investigation of various state practices that had been used to deprive Negroes of the franchise"). "There can be no remedy without a wrong. Essential to our holdings in [South Carolina v.] Katzenbach and City of Rome was our conclusion that Congress was remedying the effects of prior intentional racial discrimination. In both cases, we required Congress to have some evidence that the jurisdiction burdened with preclearance obligations had actually engaged in such intentional discrimination." Lopez, supra, at 294-295 (Thomas, J., dissenting) (emphasis in original).

The Court has never deviated from this understanding. We have explained that prophylactic legislation designed to enforce the Reconstruction Amendments must "identify conduct transgressing the ... substantive provisions" it seeks to enforce and be tailored "to remedying or preventing such conduct." Florida Prepaid Postsecondary Ed. Expense Bd. v. College Savings Bank, 527 U. S. 627, 639 (1999). Congress must establish a "history and pattern" of constitutional violations to establish the need for §5 by justifying a remedy that pushes the limits of its constitutional authority. Board of Trustees of Univ. of Ala. v. Garrett, 531 U. S. 356, 368 (2001). As a result, for §5 to withstand renewed constitutional scrutiny, there must be a demonstrated connection between the "remedial measures" chosen and the "evil presented" in the record made by Congress when it renewed the Act. City of Boerne v. Flores, 521 U. S. 507, 530 (1997). "Strong measures appropriate to address one harm may be an unwarranted response to another, lesser one." Ibid.
Dissent Part II (Section C)

The extensive pattern of discrimination that led the Court to previously uphold §5 as enforcing the Fifteenth Amendment no longer exists. Covered jurisdictions are not now engaged in a systematic campaign to deny black citizens access to the ballot through intimidation and violence. And the days of "grandfather clauses, property qualifications, 'good character' tests, and the requirement that registrants 'understand' or 'interpret' certain matter," Katzenbach, 383 U. S., at 311, are gone. There is thus currently no concerted effort in these jurisdictions to engage in the "unremitting and ingenious defiance of the Constitution," id., at 309, that served as the constitutional basis for upholding the "uncommon exercise of congressional power" embodied in §5, id., at 334.

The lack of sufficient evidence that the covered jurisdictions currently engage in the type of discrimination that underlay the enactment of §5 undermines any basis for retaining it. Punishment for long past sins is not a legitimate basis for imposing a forward-looking preventative measure that has already served its purpose. Those supporting §5's reenactment argue that without it these jurisdictions would return to the racially discriminatory practices of 30 and 40 years ago. But there is no evidence that public officials stand ready, if given the chance, to again engage in concerted acts of violence, terror, and subterfuge in order to keep minorities from voting. Without such evidence, the charge can only be premised on outdated assumptions about racial attitudes in the covered jurisdictions. Admitting that a prophylactic law as broad as §5 is no longer constitutionally justified based on current evidence of discrimination is not a sign of defeat. It is an acknowledgment of victory.

The current statistical evidence confirms that the emergency that prompted the enactment of §5 has long since passed. By 2006, the voter registration rates for blacks in Alabama, Louisiana, and Mississippi had jumped to 71.8%, 66.9%, and 72.2%, respectively. See App. to Brief for Southeastern Legal Foundation as Amicus Curiae 6a-7a (hereinafter SLF Brief). Therefore, in contrast to the Katzenbach Court's finding that the "registration of voting-age whites ran roughly 50 percentage points or more ahead of Negro registration" in these States in 1964, see 383 U. S., at 313, since that time this disparity has nearly vanished. In 2006, the disparity was only 3 percentage points in Alabama, 8 percentage points in Louisiana, and in Mississippi, black voter registration actually exceeded white voter registration by 1.5 percentage points. See App. to SLF Brief 6a-7a. In addition, blacks in these three covered States also have higher registration numbers than the registration rate for whites in noncovered states. See E. Blum & L. Campbell, Assessment of Voting Rights Progress in Jurisdictions Covered Under Section Five of the Voting Rights Act 3-6 (American Enterprise Institute, 2006); see also S. Rep. No. 109-295, p. 11 (2006) (noting that "presently in seven of the covered States, African-Americans are registered at a rate higher than the national average"; in two more, black registration in the 2004 election was "identical to the national average"; and in "California, Georgia, Mississippi, North Carolina, and Texas, black registration and turnout in the 2004 election ... was higher than that for whites").

Indeed, when reenacting §5 in 2006, Congress evidently understood that the emergency conditions which prompted §5's original enactment no longer exist. See H. R. Rep. No. 109-478, p. 12 (2006) ("The record reveals that many of the first generation barriers to minority voter registration and voter turnout that were in place prior to the VRA have been eliminated"). Instead of relying on the kind of evidence that the Katzenbach Court had found so persuasive, Congress instead based reenactment on evidence of what it termed "second generation barriers constructed to prevent minority voters from fully participating in the electoral process." §2(b)(2), 120 Stat. 577. But such evidence is not probative of the type of purposeful discrimination that prompted Congress to enact §5 in 1965. For example, Congress relied upon evidence of racially polarized voting within the covered jurisdictions. But racially polarized voting is not evidence of unconstitutional discrimination, see Bolden, 446 U. S. 55, is not state action, see James v. Bowman, 190 U. S. 127, 136 (1903), and is not a problem unique to the South, see Katz, Aisenbrey, Baldwin, Cheuse, & Weisbrodt, Documenting Discrimination in Voting: Judicial Findings Under Section 2 of The Voting Rights Act Since 1982, 39 U. Mich. J. L. Reform 643, 665 (2006). The other evidence relied on by Congress, such as §5 enforcement actions, §§2 and 4 lawsuits, and federal examiner and observer coverage, also bears no resemblance to the record initially supporting §5, and is plainly insufficient to sustain such an extraordinary remedy. See SLF Brief 18-35. In sum, evidence of "second generation barriers" cannot compare to the prevalent and pervasive voting discrimination of the 1960s.

This is not to say that voter discrimination is extinct. Indeed, the District Court singled out a handful of examples of allegedly discriminatory voting practices from the record made by Congress. See, e.g., Northwest Austin Municipal Util. Dist. No. One v. Mukasey, 573 F. Supp. 2d. 221, 252-254, 256-262 (DDC 2008). But the existence of discrete and isolated incidents of interference with the right to vote has never been sufficient justification for the imposition of §5's extraordinary requirements. From its inception, the statute was promoted as a measure needed to neutralize a coordinated and unrelenting campaign to deny an entire race access to the ballot. See City of Boerne, 521 U. S., at 526 (concluding that Katzenbach confronted a "widespread and persisting deprivation of constitutional rights resulting from this country's history of racial discrimination"). Perfect compliance with the Fifteenth Amendment's substantive command is not now--nor has it ever been--the yardstick for determining whether Congress has the power to employ broad prophylactic legislation to enforce that Amendment. The burden remains with Congress to prove that the extreme circumstances warranting §5's enactment persist today. A record of scattered infringement of the right to vote is not a constitutionally acceptable substitute.

== See also ==
- List of United States Supreme Court cases, volume 557
- List of United States Supreme Court cases
