= 1968 United States presidential election in Ohio =

- November 5, 1968

| Nominee | Richard Nixon | Hubert Humphrey | George Wallace |
| Party | Republican | Democratic | American Independent |
| Home state | New York (Note: Although he was born in California and he served as a U.S. senator from California, in 1968 Richard Nixon’s official state of residence was New York, because he moved there to practice law after his defeat in the 1962 California gubernatorial election. During his first term as president, Nixon re-established his residency in California. Consequently, most reliable reference books list Nixon's home state as New York in the 1968 election and his home state as California in the 1972 (and 1960) election.) | Minnesota | Alabama |
| Running mate | Spiro Agnew | Edmund Muskie | S. Marvin Griffin |
| Electoral vote | 26 | 0 | 0 |
| Popular vote | 1,791,014 | 1,700,586 | 467,495 |
| Percentage | 45.23% | 42.95% | 11.81% |
County results
Nixon
40–50%
50–60%
60–70%
Humphrey
40–50%
50–60%
60–70%
President before election
Lyndon B. Johnson
Democratic
Elected President
Richard Nixon
Republican

The 1968 United States presidential election in Ohio took place on November 5, 1968. All 50 states and The District of Columbia were part of the 1968 United States presidential election. Ohio voters chose 26 electors to the Electoral College, who voted for president and vice president.

Ohio was won by the Republican Party candidate, former Vice President Richard Nixon by a narrow margin of 2.28%. Nixon won the vast majority of Ohio's counties, including the major cities of Columbus, Cincinnati, Canton and Hamilton. The Democratic Party candidate, Vice President Hubert Humphrey, kept the race close by winning the major cities of Cleveland, Toledo, Akron, Dayton, Youngstown, Lorain, and Springfield.

The American Independent Party candidate, former Alabama governor George Wallace, had his best performance in the Midwestern United States, taking 11.81% of the popular vote, despite being far from his base of support in the Deep South. This was due to Ohio's presence along the borders of Kentucky and West Virginia, which are considered part of the southern United States. In the north, Wallace appealed to blue-collar workers and union members who usually voted Democratic, but who had become disgruntled with the racial violence and anti-Vietnam War protests. As a result, this split in the Democratic vote between Humphrey and Wallace was enough for Nixon to narrowly carry Ohio.

As of the 2024 presidential election, this is the last election in which Mercer County voted for a Democratic presidential candidate. Nixon became the first ever Republican to win the White House without carrying Clark, Cuyahoga, Harrison, Lorain, Lucas, Mahoning, or Portage Counties, as well as the first to do so without carrying Montgomery or Tuscarawas Counties since William Howard Taft in 1908.

== Campaign ==
A United States Supreme Court case involving ballot access occurred during the election cycle in Ohio, Williams v. Rhodes. The case involved the American Independent Party along with the Socialist Labor Party; with the American Independent Party getting enough signatures but not filing its petition prior to the February 7 deadline while the Socialist Labor Party had been of the ballot since 1948 and that year in 1968 they did not collect enough signatures. Both of the parties sued the state in a US District Court arguing being kept off the ballot was in violation of the Equal Protection Clause of the US Constitution before later merging the cases. In the District Court it was found that both political parties must be given write-in status but the state did not have to put the candidates names on the ballot. The US Supreme Court found it violated the Equal Protection Clause in a 6-3 decision.

== Results ==
1968 United States presidential election in Ohio
| Party | Candidate | Votes | Percentage | Electoral votes |
|---|---|---|---|---|
| Republican | Richard Nixon | 1,791,014 | 45.23% | 26 |
| Democrat | Hubert Humphrey | 1,700,586 | 42.95% | 0 |
| American Independent | George Wallace | 467,495 | 11.81% | 0 |
| No party | Dick Gregory (write-in) | 372 | 0.01% | 0 |
| No party | Henning A. Blomen (write-in) | 120 | 0.00% | 0 |
| No party | Fred Halstead (write-in) | 69 | 0.00% | 0 |
| No party | Charlene Mitchell (write-in) | 23 | 0.00% | 0 |
| No party | E. Harold Munn (write-in) | 19 | 0.00% | 0 |
| Totals | | 3,959,698 | 100.00% | 26 |
| Voter turnout (Voting age) | | | | 63% |

=== Results by county ===
| County | Richard Nixon Republican | | Hubert Humphrey Democratic | | George Wallace American Independent | | Various candidates Write-ins | | Margin | | Total votes cast |
| County | # | % | # | % | # | % | # | % | # | % | Total votes cast |
|---|---|---|---|---|---|---|---|---|---|---|---|
| Adams | 3,973 | 51.54% | 2,685 | 34.83% | 1,049 | 13.61% | 1 | 0.01% | 1,288 | 16.71% | 7,708 |
| Allen | 23,124 | 60.30% | 10,994 | 28.67% | 4,231 | 11.03% | | | 12,130 | 31.63% | 38,349 |
| Ashland | 9,745 | 62.49% | 4,526 | 29.02% | 1,323 | 8.48% | | | 5,219 | 33.47% | 15,594 |
| Ashtabula | 17,058 | 46.66% | 16,738 | 45.79% | 2,753 | 7.53% | 6 | 0.02% | 320 | 0.87% | 36,555 |
| Athens | 7,837 | 47.79% | 7,351 | 44.82% | 1,207 | 7.36% | 5 | 0.03% | 486 | 2.97% | 16,400 |
| Auglaize | 9,368 | 56.96% | 5,550 | 33.74% | 1,528 | 9.29% | 1 | 0.01% | 3,818 | 23.22% | 16,447 |
| Belmont | 11,512 | 31.94% | 22,056 | 61.19% | 2,478 | 6.87% | | | -10,544 | -29.25% | 36,046 |
| Brown | 4,700 | 44.27% | 3,610 | 34.00% | 2,307 | 21.73% | | | 1,090 | 10.27% | 10,617 |
| Butler | 35,962 | 48.73% | 23,649 | 32.04% | 14,188 | 19.22% | 3 | 0.00% | 12,313 | 16.69% | 73,802 |
| Carroll | 4,634 | 52.39% | 3,119 | 35.26% | 1,092 | 12.34% | 1 | 0.01% | 1,515 | 17.13% | 8,846 |
| Champaign | 6,863 | 53.83% | 4,264 | 33.44% | 1,621 | 12.71% | 2 | 0.02% | 2,599 | 20.39% | 12,750 |
| Clark | 23,748 | 43.58% | 24,029 | 44.10% | 6,710 | 12.31% | 4 | 0.01% | -281 | -0.52% | 54,491 |
| Clermont | 15,299 | 48.04% | 8,859 | 27.82% | 7,690 | 24.15% | 1 | 0.00% | 6,440 | 20.22% | 31,849 |
| Clinton | 6,265 | 56.56% | 2,982 | 26.92% | 1,830 | 16.52% | | | 3,283 | 29.64% | 11,077 |
| Columbiana | 19,947 | 46.21% | 19,382 | 44.90% | 3,832 | 8.88% | 9 | 0.02% | 565 | 1.31% | 43,170 |
| Coshocton | 7,256 | 53.59% | 5,013 | 37.03% | 1,270 | 9.38% | | | 2,243 | 16.56% | 13,539 |
| Crawford | 11,898 | 56.64% | 6,737 | 32.07% | 2,373 | 11.30% | | | 5,161 | 24.57% | 21,008 |
| Cuyahoga | 238,791 | 35.44% | 363,540 | 53.95% | 71,360 | 10.59% | 148 | 0.02% | -124,749 | -18.51% | 673,839 |
| Darke | 10,926 | 53.78% | 7,371 | 36.28% | 2,015 | 9.92% | 3 | 0.01% | 3,555 | 17.50% | 20,315 |
| Defiance | 7,348 | 52.64% | 5,686 | 40.73% | 925 | 6.63% | | | 1,662 | 11.91% | 13,959 |
| Delaware | 9,029 | 57.72% | 4,056 | 25.93% | 2,557 | 16.34% | 2 | 0.01% | 4,973 | 31.79% | 15,644 |
| Erie | 13,023 | 48.50% | 11,388 | 42.41% | 2,437 | 9.08% | 1 | 0.00% | 1,635 | 6.09% | 26,849 |
| Fairfield | 14,810 | 52.03% | 9,533 | 33.49% | 4,124 | 14.49% | | | 5,277 | 18.54% | 28,467 |
| Fayette | 5,339 | 51.99% | 2,966 | 28.88% | 1,962 | 19.11% | 2 | 0.02% | 2,373 | 23.11% | 10,269 |
| Franklin | 148,933 | 51.78% | 101,240 | 35.20% | 37,390 | 13.00% | 61 | 0.02% | 47,693 | 16.58% | 287,624 |
| Fulton | 7,817 | 64.14% | 3,338 | 27.39% | 1,033 | 8.48% | | | 4,479 | 36.75% | 12,188 |
| Gallia | 5,134 | 58.10% | 2,660 | 30.10% | 1,039 | 11.76% | 3 | 0.03% | 2,474 | 28.00% | 8,836 |
| Geauga | 11,857 | 51.76% | 7,825 | 34.16% | 3,226 | 14.08% | | | 4,032 | 17.60% | 22,908 |
| Greene | 17,589 | 45.36% | 15,178 | 39.14% | 5,999 | 15.47% | 9 | 0.02% | 2,411 | 6.22% | 38,775 |
| Guernsey | 7,336 | 49.44% | 5,815 | 39.19% | 1,685 | 11.36% | 1 | 0.01% | 1,521 | 10.25% | 14,837 |
| Hamilton | 183,611 | 50.24% | 135,057 | 36.95% | 46,742 | 12.79% | 73 | 0.02% | 48,554 | 13.29% | 365,483 |
| Hancock | 15,032 | 61.08% | 6,918 | 28.11% | 2,659 | 10.80% | | | 8,114 | 32.97% | 24,609 |
| Hardin | 6,963 | 53.82% | 4,180 | 32.31% | 1,794 | 13.87% | | | 2,783 | 21.51% | 12,937 |
| Harrison | 3,532 | 45.87% | 3,594 | 46.68% | 574 | 7.45% | | | -62 | -0.81% | 7,700 |
| Henry | 6,970 | 63.21% | 3,256 | 29.53% | 799 | 7.25% | 1 | 0.01% | 3,714 | 33.68% | 11,026 |
| Highland | 6,489 | 51.81% | 3,828 | 30.56% | 2,208 | 17.63% | | | 2,661 | 21.25% | 12,525 |
| Hocking | 3,998 | 45.94% | 3,701 | 42.53% | 1,003 | 11.53% | | | 297 | 3.41% | 8,702 |
| Holmes | 3,350 | 58.47% | 1,898 | 33.13% | 479 | 8.36% | 2 | 0.03% | 1,452 | 25.34% | 5,729 |
| Huron | 9,456 | 53.38% | 6,515 | 36.78% | 1,741 | 9.83% | 2 | 0.01% | 2,941 | 16.60% | 17,714 |
| Jackson | 5,870 | 53.52% | 4,021 | 36.66% | 1,077 | 9.82% | | | 1,849 | 16.86% | 10,968 |
| Jefferson | 12,949 | 33.53% | 21,917 | 56.76% | 3,740 | 9.69% | 9 | 0.02% | -8,968 | -23.23% | 38,615 |
| Knox | 9,072 | 55.01% | 5,725 | 34.71% | 1,695 | 10.28% | | | 3,347 | 20.30% | 16,492 |
| Lake | 28,450 | 43.40% | 27,932 | 42.61% | 9,160 | 13.97% | 17 | 0.03% | 518 | 0.79% | 65,559 |
| Lawrence | 9,782 | 46.75% | 8,671 | 41.44% | 2,470 | 11.81% | | | 1,111 | 5.31% | 20,923 |
| Licking | 19,542 | 48.89% | 15,021 | 37.58% | 5,405 | 13.52% | 2 | 0.01% | 4,521 | 11.31% | 39,970 |
| Logan | 8,362 | 56.12% | 4,889 | 32.81% | 1,647 | 11.05% | 1 | 0.01% | 3,473 | 23.31% | 14,899 |
| Lorain | 34,252 | 39.95% | 42,642 | 49.74% | 8,825 | 10.29% | 8 | 0.01% | -8,390 | -9.79% | 85,727 |
| Lucas | 69,403 | 38.98% | 91,346 | 51.31% | 17,260 | 9.69% | 28 | 0.02% | -21,943 | -12.33% | 178,037 |
| Madison | 5,882 | 57.15% | 2,780 | 27.01% | 1,631 | 15.85% | | | 3,102 | 30.14% | 10,293 |
| Mahoning | 42,948 | 34.75% | 68,433 | 55.38% | 12,189 | 9.86% | 8 | 0.01% | -25,485 | -20.63% | 123,578 |
| Marion | 12,887 | 53.10% | 8,611 | 35.48% | 2,772 | 11.42% | 1 | 0.00% | 4,276 | 17.62% | 24,271 |
| Medina | 14,089 | 52.31% | 9,194 | 34.14% | 3,632 | 13.49% | 18 | 0.07% | 4,895 | 18.17% | 26,933 |
| Meigs | 4,759 | 56.29% | 2,921 | 34.55% | 774 | 9.15% | 1 | 0.01% | 1,838 | 21.74% | 8,455 |
| Mercer | 6,313 | 44.43% | 6,801 | 47.86% | 1,095 | 7.71% | | | -488 | -3.43% | 14,209 |
| Miami | 16,997 | 50.62% | 13,228 | 39.40% | 3,348 | 9.97% | 4 | 0.01% | 3,769 | 11.22% | 33,577 |
| Monroe | 2,686 | 42.27% | 3,105 | 48.87% | 562 | 8.84% | 1 | 0.02% | -419 | -6.60% | 6,354 |
| Montgomery | 84,766 | 40.93% | 96,082 | 46.39% | 26,232 | 12.67% | 40 | 0.02% | -11,316 | -5.46% | 207,120 |
| Morgan | 3,030 | 57.51% | 1,789 | 33.95% | 450 | 8.54% | | | 1,241 | 23.56% | 5,269 |
| Morrow | 4,898 | 55.58% | 2,405 | 27.29% | 1,509 | 17.12% | | | 2,493 | 28.29% | 8,812 |
| Muskingum | 15,260 | 48.13% | 13,089 | 41.28% | 3,356 | 10.59% | | | 2,171 | 6.85% | 31,705 |
| Noble | 2,615 | 53.06% | 1,726 | 35.02% | 587 | 11.91% | | | 889 | 18.04% | 4,928 |
| Ottawa | 7,149 | 47.30% | 6,319 | 41.81% | 1,647 | 10.90% | | | 830 | 5.49% | 15,115 |
| Paulding | 4,074 | 53.01% | 2,703 | 35.17% | 908 | 11.82% | | | 1,371 | 17.84% | 7,685 |
| Perry | 4,815 | 44.96% | 4,811 | 44.92% | 1,084 | 10.12% | | | 4 | 0.04% | 10,710 |
| Pickaway | 6,690 | 53.25% | 3,536 | 28.14% | 2,335 | 18.58% | 3 | 0.02% | 3,154 | 25.11% | 12,564 |
| Pike | 3,247 | 40.01% | 3,445 | 42.45% | 1,423 | 17.54% | | | -198 | -2.44% | 8,115 |
| Portage | 15,064 | 41.27% | 16,348 | 44.78% | 5,093 | 13.95% | | | -1,284 | -3.51% | 36,505 |
| Preble | 6,544 | 52.63% | 3,817 | 30.70% | 2,073 | 16.67% | | | 2,727 | 21.93% | 12,434 |
| Putnam | 7,188 | 59.38% | 3,530 | 29.16% | 1,387 | 11.46% | | | 3,658 | 30.22% | 12,105 |
| Richland | 23,484 | 53.63% | 14,988 | 34.23% | 5,311 | 12.13% | 4 | 0.01% | 8,496 | 19.40% | 43,787 |
| Ross | 11,284 | 50.72% | 6,873 | 30.90% | 4,087 | 18.37% | 2 | 0.01% | 4,411 | 19.82% | 22,246 |
| Sandusky | 11,696 | 53.10% | 8,581 | 38.96% | 1,745 | 7.92% | 3 | 0.01% | 3,115 | 14.14% | 22,025 |
| Scioto | 15,310 | 47.37% | 13,836 | 42.81% | 3,171 | 9.81% | | | 1,474 | 4.56% | 32,317 |
| Seneca | 12,040 | 52.30% | 8,970 | 38.97% | 2,010 | 8.73% | | | 3,070 | 13.33% | 23,020 |
| Shelby | 7,248 | 47.60% | 6,479 | 42.55% | 1,499 | 9.85% | | | 769 | 5.05% | 15,226 |
| Stark | 68,414 | 47.88% | 57,675 | 40.36% | 16,775 | 11.74% | 24 | 0.02% | 10,739 | 7.52% | 142,888 |
| Summit | 82,649 | 39.56% | 100,068 | 47.89% | 26,157 | 12.52% | 67 | 0.03% | -17,419 | -8.33% | 208,941 |
| Trumbull | 33,076 | 39.97% | 40,365 | 48.77% | 9,314 | 11.25% | 5 | 0.01% | -7,289 | -8.80% | 82,760 |
| Tuscarawas | 14,102 | 43.44% | 15,617 | 48.11% | 2,741 | 8.44% | 1 | 0.00% | -1,515 | -4.67% | 32,461 |
| Union | 6,415 | 62.66% | 2,431 | 23.74% | 1,392 | 13.60% | | | 3,984 | 38.92% | 10,238 |
| Van Wert | 7,835 | 57.92% | 4,360 | 32.23% | 1,332 | 9.85% | | | 3,475 | 25.69% | 13,527 |
| Vinton | 2,219 | 52.31% | 1,608 | 37.91% | 414 | 9.76% | 1 | 0.02% | 611 | 14.40% | 4,242 |
| Warren | 12,663 | 48.68% | 6,756 | 25.97% | 6,595 | 25.35% | | | 5,907 | 22.71% | 26,014 |
| Washington | 11,888 | 58.25% | 6,922 | 33.92% | 1,597 | 7.83% | 1 | 0.00% | 4,966 | 24.33% | 20,408 |
| Wayne | 15,151 | 58.34% | 8,891 | 34.24% | 1,924 | 7.41% | 4 | 0.02% | 6,260 | 24.10% | 25,970 |
| Williams | 8,059 | 59.76% | 4,456 | 33.04% | 970 | 7.19% | | | 3,603 | 26.72% | 13,485 |
| Wood | 16,111 | 53.81% | 10,867 | 36.30% | 2,952 | 9.86% | 9 | 0.03% | 5,244 | 17.51% | 29,939 |
| Wyandot | 5,265 | 57.90% | 2,919 | 32.10% | 910 | 10.01% | | | 2,346 | 25.80% | 9,094 |
| Totals | 1,791,014 | 45.23% | 1,700,586 | 42.95% | 467,495 | 11.81% | 603 | 0.02% | 90,428 | 2.28% | 3,959,698 |

==== Counties that flipped from Democratic to Republican ====
- Adams
- Ashland
- Ashtabula
- Athens
- Auglaize
- Brown
- Butler
- Carroll
- Champaign
- Clermont
- Clinton
- Columbiana
- Coshocton
- Crawford
- Darke
- Defiance
- Erie
- Fairfield
- Fayette
- Franklin
- Gallia
- Geauga
- Greene
- Guernsey
- Hamilton
- Hardin
- Henry
- Highland
- Hocking
- Holmes
- Huron
- Jackson
- Knox
- Lake
- Lawrence
- Licking
- Logan
- Madison
- Marion
- Medina
- Meigs
- Miami
- Morgan
- Morrow
- Muskingum
- Noble
- Ottawa
- Paulding
- Perry
- Pickaway
- Preble
- Putnam
- Richland
- Ross
- Sandusky
- Scioto
- Seneca
- Shelby
- Stark
- Van Wert
- Vinton
- Warren
- Washington
- Wayne
- Williams
- Wood
- Wyandot

== See also ==
- United States presidential elections in Ohio
