= Bounds v. Smith =

- Supreme Court of the United States

Argued November 1, 1976 Decided April 27, 1977
- Full case name: Vernon Lee Bounds, Correction Commissioner, et al. v. Robert (Bobby) Smith, et al.
- Citations: 430 U.S. 817 (more) 97 S. Ct. 1491; 52 L. Ed. 2d 72; 1977 U.S. LEXIS 79

Case history
- Prior: Smith v. Bounds, 538 F.2d 541 (4th Cir. 1975); cert. granted, 425 U.S. 910 (1976).

Holding
- Prisoners must be provided with adequate legal libraries and counsel in order to satisfy the right to access of the courts

Court membership
- Chief Justice Warren E. Burger Associate Justices William J. Brennan Jr. · Potter Stewart; Byron White · Thurgood Marshall; Harry Blackmun · Lewis F. Powell Jr. William Rehnquist · John P. Stevens

Case opinions
- Majority: Marshall, joined by Brennan, White, Blackmun, Powell, Stevens
- Concurrence: Powell
- Dissent: Burger
- Dissent: Stewart, joined by Burger
- Dissent: Rehnquist, joined by Burger

Bounds v. Smith, 430 U.S. 817 (1977), was a United States Supreme Court case in which the Court tested the basic constitutional right of prison inmates' access to legal documents prior to court. Prison authorities would consequently be required to provide legal assistance or counsel to inmates, whether it be through a trained legal professional or access to a legal library. Multiple prisoners alleged that they were denied access to the courts due to lack of an adequate legal library and assistance with court related documents.

== Background ==
The case of Bounds v. Smith was preceded by Johnson v. Avery, a similar case brought before the U.S. Supreme Court in 1969 concerning, once again, the extent of prisoners' rights within the confines of a jail or penitentiary. Johnson v. Avery involved a Tennessee convict who petitioned the courts regarding the prison's disciplinary action exacted on the inmate after breaking a prison rule. The rule states, "No inmate will advise, assist or otherwise contract to aid another, either with or without a fee, to prepare Writs or other legal matters. It is not intended that an innocent man be punished. When a man believes he is unlawfully held or illegally convicted, he should prepare a brief or state his complaint in letter form and address it to his lawyer or a judge. A formal Writ is not necessary to receive a hearing. False charges or untrue complaints may be punished. Inmates are forbidden to set themselves up as practitioners for the purpose of promoting a business of writing Writs." The Court ruled in favor of the prisoners. Johnson v. Avery established that the assistance of a prisoner by a prisoner in filing and research of legal papers related to the criminal prosecution of said prisoner was completely legal under the facts of this case.

There have been many cases, similar to Bounds v. Smith, that have established reasonable precedent regarding a prisoner's access to the courts. In the case of Cochran v. Kansas of 1942, it was confirmed that prisoners have a right of access to the courts and the prohibition of this access is unconstitutional. Specifically, Cochran v. Kansas ruled in favor of a petitioner, who was a prisoner, who wished to file with the federal courts a writ of habeas corpus. Again, a similar instance preceded Bounds v. Smith. In Burns v. Ohio of 1959, the Supreme Court ruled that docket and other fees imposed on inmates were constitutional violations. By 1963, in Douglas v. California, the Court even went as far as to rule that a prisoner must be provided legal counsel if it means he will receive a "meaningful appeal." Time and time again, the rulings of additional court cases have struck down hindrances obstructing the right of prisoners access to the courts.

== Conflict ==
In the case of Bounds v. Smith, respondents of the courts are those incarcerated within the Division of Prisons of the North Carolina Department of Correction. These respondents filed three actions alleging a violation of their Fourteenth Amendment rights through denial of proper avenues to research. Eventually the case was heard at District Court. The courts approved the motion based on a number of valid claims made by the respondents, specifically citing the lack of an adequate prison library system reason enough for a trial. Due to precedent established in, first, Johnson v. Avery, and then Younger v. Gilmore, the courts found that equality under law had been disregarded because of a severe lack of assistance for inmates wishing to prepare legal documents. Specifically in the case of North Carolina's prison system however, the substance of valuable legal assistance was scarce and thus presented a possibly more logistical problem than argued by the respondents. The District Courts did recognize this fact. The District Court ruled that North Carolina must develop and institute a plan that provided inmates with a form of legal assistance that satisfied a degree of Constitutionality. It was suggested to Senators that they create an effective and economic plan possibly providing lawyers and other legal professionals along with the expansion of state law libraries.

And so, the state responded. A proposal designed to redefine the State's legal informational system was drawn up. The establishment of seven new libraries, spread across the state, was planned, along with the creation of additional smaller libraries. Use of the libraries required an appointment. Appointments were preferentially given to those with court dates within the next month. In accordance with the fact that libraries were not always located within prisons, transportation and housing would also be provided by the State.

The State then sought to create a legal library system, in accordance to what the courts determined to be "adequate." The revamped libraries included a vast collection of law books, type writers, and a supply of legal forms. Additionally, the State trained inmates as assistants and typists, who were made readily available to aid fellow inmates. The new library system supported about 350 prisoners per week. Despite the changes and obvious improvements, prisoners were still unsatisfied with the new library and research system. Protestors of the new plan claimed it was inadequate in that it failed to satisfy the basic legal needs of every prisoner, thus denying citizens access to the courts. Respondents demanded a library in every prison.

At the level of the District Court, however, the plan was seen as not only legally adequate, but economically sustainable. With these two conditions seemingly met, the Court rejected the respondents' objections. Along with the overruling of this objection, the District Court also concluded that, constitutionally, the State was not required to provide legal assistance to prisoners. Individual legal assistance was not necessary and the furnishings of attorneys were not necessary, with such a sufficient library at hand. This was the final decision of the District Court.

With the approval of the plan, the State then applied for federal aid, hoping to cover up to 90% of the costs of building and maintaining the new prison libraries. The grant that the State applied to is the Federal Law Enforcement Assistance Administration. Under federal laws, the applicants must satisfy a set of criteria in order to receive any sort of monetary aid. The State of North Carolina's application proposed what they believed to be "meaningful and effective access to the court…" According to the evaluators, however, the proposal lacked legal assistance in women's prisons across the state and thus the case was ordered to judicial evaluation. Both the State and respondents appealed the ruling, each discontent with the Court's rulings adverse to them. The case was then brought to the Court of Appeals, who denied the plan funding and additionally ordered it be abolished. The State of North Carolina then petitioned the Supreme Court for a writ of certiorari, which was granted.

== Opinion of the Court ==
Justice Marshall delivered the opinion of the court. He started by establishing that the court accepted the precedent built up from previous cases and confirmed that prisoners have a right to access of the courts. He states "Petitioners' hyperbolic claim is particularly inappropriate in this case, for the courts below scrupulously respected the limits on their role. The District Court initially held only that petitioners had violated the "fundamental constitutional guarantee," ibid., of access to the courts. It did not thereupon thrust itself into prison administration. Rather, it ordered petitioners themselves to devise a remedy for the violation, strongly suggesting that it would prefer a plan providing trained legal advisors. Petitioners chose to establish law libraries, however, and their plan was approved with only minimal changes over the strong objections of respondents. Prison administrators thus exercised wide discretion within the bounds of constitutional requirements in this case. The judgment is: Affirmed."

Justice Rehnquist issued the dissenting opinion. He stated, "There is nothing in the United States Constitution which requires that a convict serving a term of imprisonment in a state penal institution pursuant to a final judgment of a court of competent jurisdiction have a "right of access" to the federal courts in order to attack his sentence... In any event, the Court's opinion today does not appear to proceed upon the guarantee of equal protection of the laws, a guarantee which at least has the merit of being found in the Fourteenth Amendment to the Constitution. It proceeds instead to enunciate a "fundamental constitutional right of access to the courts," ante, at 828, which is found nowhere in the Constitution. But if a prisoner incarcerated pursuant to a final judgment of conviction is not prevented from physical access to the federal courts in order that he may file therein petitions for relief which Congress has authorized those courts to grant, he has been accorded the only constitutional right of access to the courts that our cases have articulated in a reasoned way."

== Subsequent developments ==
In Lewis v. Casey, the court limited the application of Bounds. Justice Scalia, writing for the court, stated: "In other words, Bounds does not guarantee inmates the wherewithal to transform themselves into litigating engines capable of filing everything from shareholder derivative actions to slip-and-fall claims. The tools it requires to be provided are those that the inmates need in order to attack their sentences, directly or collaterally, and in order to challenge the conditions of their confinement. Impairment of any other litigating capacity is simply one of the incidental (and perfectly constitutional) consequences of conviction and incarceration." Then-Chief Justice Rehnquist, who authored the dissent in Bounds v. Smith as an associate justice, joined in the court's opinion in Lewis v. Casey.
