= South Carolina v. Katzenbach =

- Supreme Court of the United States

Argued January 17–18, 1966 Decided March 7, 1966
- Full case name: State of South Carolina v. Nicholas DeB Katzenbach, Attorney General
- Citations: 383 U.S. 301 (more) 86 S. Ct. 803; 15 L. Ed. 2d 769; 1966 U.S. LEXIS 2112
- Argument: Oral argument
- Reargument: Reargument

Questions presented
- Does the Voting Rights Act of 1965 violate the states' constitutional ability to implement and control elections?

Holding
- The Voting Rights Act of 1965 does not violate the states' constitutional ability to implement and control elections. Therefore, it is a constitutionally valid exercise of congressional power for the effectuation of the Fifteenth Amendment to the Constitution of the United States of America.

Court membership
- Chief Justice Earl Warren Associate Justices Hugo Black · William O. Douglas; Tom C. Clark · John M. Harlan II; William J. Brennan Jr. · Potter Stewart; Byron White · Abe Fortas

Case opinions
- Majority: Warren, joined by Douglas, Clark, Harlan, Brennan, Stewart, White, Fortas
- Concur/dissent: Black

Laws applied
- U.S. Const. amend. XV, Voting Rights Act of 1965

South Carolina v. Katzenbach, 383 U.S. 301 (1966), is a landmark decision of the United States Supreme Court that rejected a challenge from the state of South Carolina to the preclearance provisions of the Voting Rights Act of 1965, which required that some states submit changes in election districts to the attorney general of the United States (at the time, Nicholas Katzenbach). The preclearance provisions were ruled constitutional and the Voting Rights Act of 1965 was enforced in full.

== Background ==
The Voting Rights Act of 1965 required states to make adjustments to their voting and registration systems if the state employed a literacy test and if the voter turnout or registration was less than fifty percent by November 1, 1964. This was known as the preclearance requirement and affected mostly southern states, making them seek approval from the U.S. District Court for any changes to their voter registration and voting system.

In South Carolina, the state attorney general, Daniel R. McLeod filed a complaint directly with the Supreme Court attacking the constitutionality of the act and asking for an injunction against enforcement by the attorney general of the United States, Nicholas Katzenbach. McLeod challenged the Voting Rights Act as an unconstitutional encroachment on states’ rights, as a violation of equality between the states, and as an illegal bill of attainder which is legislative punishment enforced without due process of law.

South Carolina was joined on its attack on the Voting Rights Act by other southern states. Meanwhile, the twenty states that filed in support of the act's provisions and powers mainly consisted of northern and western states. While other states did not file suit, many southern states supported South Carolina's actions. The case took on an even wider significance than normal state challenges to a new federal law because it dealt with both state sovereignty and the power of the legislative branch.

The decision represents a rare instance of the Supreme Court exercising its right of original jurisdiction, as the case was filed directly in the Supreme Court by the state of South Carolina, rather than being appealed from a lower court. The court intentionally heard the case prior to June of 1966 so their decision would be in effect for South Carolina's primary elections that year.

== The opinion of the Court ==
In his opinion for the Court, Chief Justice Earl Warren wrote that the Voting Rights Act of 1965 was a valid exercise of Congress' power under the enforcement clause of the Fifteenth Amendment to the United States Constitution.

Warren cited the enforcement clause of the 15th Amendment which gave Congress full powers to stop discrimination in regards to voting. He also stated that the Voting Rights Act was necessary to remedy the evil of racism. Additionally, the historical record showed that the 15th Amendment was not strong enough on its own since voter discrimination had continued despite the amendment. The Voting Rights Act provided sterner and more enforceable measures to ensure equal voting opportunities to all citizens.

The only dissent in the ruling came from Justice Hugo L. Black who opposed the legislation because he felt it exceeded the textual reach of the constitution. In his dissent, he explained, “There is no reason to read into the Constitution meanings it did not have when it was adopted and which have not been put into place.” While he would have sustained most of the law, he would have struck down the Section 5 preclearance provisions.

Section 5, by providing that some of the States cannot pass state laws or adopt state constitutional amendments without first being compelled to beg federal authorities to approve their policies, so distorts our constitutional structure of government as to render any distinction drawn in the Constitution between state and federal power almost meaningless. One of the most basic premises upon which our structure of government was founded was that the Federal Government was to have certain specific and limited powers and no others, and all other power was to be reserved either 'to the States respectively, or to the people.' Certainly if all the provisions of our Constitution which limit the power of the Federal Government and reserve other power to the States are to mean anything, they mean at least that the States have power to pass laws and amend their constitutions without first sending their officials hundreds of miles away to beg federal authorities to approve them.

== Impact ==
Through the court's majority decision, the Voting Rights Act of 1965 was upheld and, thus, it was able to be implemented without any barriers whatsoever. This allowed for over 800,000 African Americans to register to vote between 1964 and 1967. This case was also used as a precedent in other judicial challenges to the Voting Rights Act. According to Indiana University Maurer School of Law professor Luis Fuentes-Rohwer, the case served as an example of a firm interpretation of the 15th Amendment, which granted Congress "full remedial powers" to prevent any racial discrimination. Fuentes-Roher also stated that the case was also an example of the Supreme Court giving more power to Congress by allowing them to create legislation on a topic usually reserved for the States. Opponents of the ruling cite this as an example of excessive judicial activism, implying this was an overreach of the Supreme Court's powers. They argue the case was decided by the judges' personal beliefs and motives instead of the law and judicial precedent.

This ruling was a massive win for the Civil Rights Movement, allowing for over 800,000 African Americans to register to vote between 1964 and 1967. The success of the Voting Rights Act allowed President Johnson to continue with the civil rights reform, including legislation such as the Fair Housing Act. This act provided equal housing opportunities regardless of race, religion, or nationality. This case was also used as precedent in other judicial challenges to the Voting Rights Act such as Allen v. State Board of Elections and Beer v. United States.

The significance of South Carolina v. Katzenbach diminished in 2013 with the decision of Shelby County v. Holder. The Supreme Court struck down provisions in the Voting Rights Act 5-4 because it was based on decades-old data, making it no longer applicable to present laws and regulations.

== See also ==
- Shelby County v. Holder (2013)
