= Canyon Creek, Austin, Texas =

Neighborhood in Austin, Texas

Coordinates: 30.4338°N 97.8241°W

Neighborhood map

Canyon Creek is a residential neighborhood located in far northwest Austin, Texas. The neighborhood is located in ZIP Code 78726 and is bordered by Ranch to Market Road 2222 (RM 2222) on the south, Ranch to Market Road 620 (RM 620) on the west, Anderson Mill Road on the north, and a major headwater tributary of Bull Creek to the east as well as the Balcones Canyonlands National Wildlife Refuge. The major bisecting road is Boulder Lane, a loop which crosses RM 620 at the north and south entrances. The neighborhood is approximately 5 miles (8.0 km) from Lake Travis and Lake Austin.

Canyon Creek was former ranch and hunting land, much of which was once a working cattle ranch owned by former US Congressman J. J. Pickle. It was developed by the Blanton Company in the wake of the savings and loan crisis in the United States in the late 1980s. Perry Blanton and his company envisioned and developed a completely planned community filled with homes, parks, and connecting trails. It contains significant protected habitat for the golden-cheeked warbler, an endangered bird species native to central Texas. The neighborhood developed rapidly in the 1990s, and was completely built out by 2005. In the mid-1990s, Round Rock Independent School District authorized the construction of Canyon Creek Elementary School in the neighborhood.

In 2009 a lawsuit brought by Canyon Creek, Northwest Austin Municipal Utility District No. 1 v. Holder, regarding the relocation of a polling place, was heard before the Supreme Court of the United States

== Education ==
=== Public Schools ===
Canyon Creek is served by two School Districts:

Round Rock Independent School District (RRISD)

- Canyon Creek Elementary School, a National Blue Ribbon school
- Grisham Middle School, recently recognized as an International Baccalaurate World School (IB)
- Westwood High School, an Exemplary high school ranked number 78 in the U.S. News and World

Report survey in 2006

Leander Independent School District

- Grandview Hills Elementary School, an International Baccalaurate World School
- Four Points Middle School
- Vandegrift High School

=== Private Schools ===
Canyon Creek has nearby private schools:

- Hill Country Bible School (K-12)
- Summit Christian Academy (K-12)
- Canyon Creek Preschool (birth - 5 years)

=== Nearby University ===
- Concordia University Texas (4 year, private, on the grounds of the former Schlumberger corporate campus)

== Churches ==
Nearby religious institutions include:

- Church at Canyon Creek (Southern Baptist Convention)
- St. Thomas More Catholic Church (Austin Diocese, Catholic)
- Hill Country Bible Church (Bible)
- Cypress Creek Community Church (Missionary Church-USA, on the grounds of Summit Christian Academy, Cedar Park)
- Live Oak Unitarian-Universalist Church (UU, Cedar Park)
- Dell Jewish Community Center Campus (containing both conservative and reform Jewish synagogues)
- Peace Lutheran Church (Lutheran, Missouri Synod)
