= Johnson v. Avery =

- Supreme Court of the United States

Argued November 14, 1968 Decided February 24, 1969
- Full case name: William Joe Johnson v. Avery, Commissioner of Correction
- Citations: 393 U.S. 483 (more)
- Argument: Oral argument

Holding
- Absent a reasonable alternative, state prison officials may not enforce an absolute bar on inmates providing legal assistance to one another.

Court membership
- Chief Justice Earl Warren Associate Justices Hugo Black · William O. Douglas; John M. Harlan II · William J. Brennan Jr. Potter Stewart · Byron White; Abe Fortas · Thurgood Marshall

Case opinions
- Majority: Fortas, joined by Warren, Douglas, Harlan, Brennan, Stewart, Marshall
- Dissent: White, joined by Black

Laws applied
- 28 U. S. C. § 2242

Johnson v. Avery, 393 U.S. 483 (1969) was a United States Supreme Court case that expanded the rights of incarcerated litigants. In a 7-2 decision, the Court ruled that state prison officials could not prohibit the activities of jailhouse lawyers unless they provided them with access to a "reasonable alternative." The case involved William Joe Johnson, a Tennessee state prisoner serving a life sentence for rape who had been sent to solitary confinement for assisting other prisoners with their legal filings.

== Background ==
Johnson filed suit in federal district court, alleging a violation of various constitutional rights. In January 1966, William E. Miller, a district court judge ruled that Tennessee prison officials had "interfered with the statutory right of prisoners" to file habeas corpus writs by banning the activities of jailhouse lawyers. In his ruling, Miller noted that "[f]or all practical purposes, if such prisoners cannot have the assistance of a 'jail-house lawyer,' their possibly valid constitutional claims will never be heard in any court." Miller's decision was reversed by the United States Court of Appeals for the Sixth Circuit, holding that Tennessee's practices did not unlawfully interefere with prisoners' federal right to seek habeas corpus. Johnson appealed the ruling to the Supreme Court with the aid of a Vanderbilt University law professor, Karl P. Warden. The ACLU filed an amicus curiae brief on Johnson's behalf, while the state of California filed a brief defending its restrictions on jailhouse lawyers and use of form filings.

== Supreme Court ==
The court ruled in Johnson's favor by a 7-2 vote. The decision, written by Abe Fortas, stressed that Tennessee could not engage in practices that would prevent illiterate inmates from accessing the courts. His decision cited earlier cases like Ex Parte Hull (1941), which had ruled against Michigan prison officials who had issued a regulation that required indigent prisoners to submit their writs for approval by prison officials before filing them. However, the Court stipulated that prisons could restrict jailhouse lawyers' activities to certain hours of the day, prevent them from accepting compensation, or outlaw these activities entirely by providing free legal services. Johnson's basic principle of access was sustained by later twentieth century cases, although Lewis v. Casey (1996) found that the state of Arizona could place severe restrictions on prisoners' access to law libraries, which many states had adopted as a "reasonable alternative" in the aftermath of Johnson.
