= List of United States Supreme Court cases, volume 393 =

This is a list of all the United States Supreme Court cases from volume 393 of the United States Reports:

Case name	Citation	Date decided
Californians for an Alternative in November v. California	393 U.S. 1	1968
McConnell v. Rhay	393 U.S. 2	1968
Arsenault v. Massachusetts	393 U.S. 5	1968
Hanover Ins. Co. v. Victor	393 U.S. 7	1968
Cohon v. Kirby	393 U.S. 7	1968
Makah Tribe v. Tax Comm'n	393 U.S. 8	1968
Desert Outdoor Advertising, Inc. v. an Bernardino Cnty.	393 U.S. 8	1968
Whitney Stores, Inc. v. Summerford	393 U.S. 9	1968
Hornbeak v. Hamm	393 U.S. 9	1968
Biddle v. Bowser	393 U.S. 10	1968
Brown v. Resor	393 U.S. 10	1968
Loptien v. City of Sycamore	393 U.S. 11	1968
Samson Market Co. v. Kirby	393 U.S. 11	1968
Samson Market Co. v. Kirby	393 U.S. 12	1968
Martone v. Morgan	393 U.S. 12	1968
Lewinson v. Crews	393 U.S. 13	1968
Estate of Burnell v. Colorado	393 U.S. 13	1968
Rosso v. Puerto Rico	393 U.S. 14	1968
Roberts v. Pollard	393 U.S. 14	1968
Ilowite v. United States	393 U.S. 15	1968
Butler v. Brierley	393 U.S. 15	1968
Penjaska v. Goodbody & Co.	393 U.S. 16	1968
Bates v. Nelson	393 U.S. 16	1968
Louisiana Ed. Comm'n for Needy Children v. Poindexter	393 U.S. 17	1968
Westside Liquor Co. v. Kirby	393 U.S. 17	1968
Guerra v. Mississippi	393 U.S. 18	1968
National Motor Freight Traffic Assn., Inc. v. United States	393 U.S. 18	1968
Pennwick Corp. v. Kirby	393 U.S. 19	1968
Tyrrell v. Crouse	393 U.S. 19	1968
Blabon v. Nelson	393 U.S. 20	1968
Lemanski v. Lemanski	393 U.S. 20	1968
Jones v. Georgia	393 U.S. 21	1968
Workman v. Utah	393 U.S. 21	1968
Anderson v. Florida	393 U.S. 22	1968
Muniz v. Beto	393 U.S. 22	1968
Williams v. Rhodes	393 U.S. 23	1968
FPC v. United Gas Pipe Line Co.	393 U.S. 71	1968
International Terminal Operating Co. v. N. V. Nederal. Amerik Stoomv. Maats.	393 U.S. 74	1968
Bounds v. Crawford	393 U.S. 76	1968
In re Hagopian	393 U.S. 76	1968
Lake v. Potomac Light & Power Co.	393 U.S. 77	1968
Dymytryshyn v. Esperdy	393 U.S. 77	1968
Chemical Tank Lines, Inc. v. Holstine	393 U.S. 78	1968
Cont'l Oil Co. v. United States	393 U.S. 79	1968
Fuller v. Alaska	393 U.S. 80	1968
Mengelkoch v. Industrial Welfare Comm'n	393 U.S. 83	1968
Overton v. New York	393 U.S. 85	1968
Lichten v. Texas	393 U.S. 86	1968
Balt. & Ohio R. Co. v. Aberdeen & Rockfish R. Co.	393 U.S. 87	1968
Epperson v. Arkansas	393 U.S. 97	1968
WHYY, Inc. v. Glassboro	393 U.S. 117	1968
Smith v. Yeager	393 U.S. 122	1968
Atlantic Ocean Products, Inc. v. Leth	393 U.S. 127	1968
Doolin v. Korshak	393 U.S. 127	1968
Cross v. Ct. of Appeal	393 U.S. 128	1968
Locomotive Firemen v. Chi. R. I. & P. R. Co.	393 U.S. 129	1968
Commonwealth Coatings Corp. v. Continental Casualty Co.	393 U.S. 145	1968
Grunenthal v. Long Island R. Co.	393 U.S. 156	1968
Recznik v. City of Lorain	393 U.S. 166	1968
Carroll v. Princess Anne Cnty.	393 U.S. 175	1968
Universal Interpretive Shuttle Corp. v. Washington Metro. Area Transit Comm'n	393 U.S. 186	1968
United States v. Concentrated Phosphate Export Assn., Inc.	393 U.S. 199	1968
Atchison T. & S. F. R. Co. v. United States	393 U.S. 214	1968
Austin v. Webster	393 U.S. 214	1968
Collins v. Comm'r	393 U.S. 215	1968
Arthur v. Virginia	393 U.S. 215	1968
Farbenfabriken Bayer A. G. v. United States	393 U.S. 216	1968
Green v. Turner	393 U.S. 216	1968
Stamler v. Willis	393 U.S. 217	1968
Palmieri v. Florida	393 U.S. 218	1968
Stiles v. United States	393 U.S. 219	1968
Shaw v. Garrison	393 U.S. 220	1968
Landry v. Boyle	393 U.S. 220	1968
Moore v. Ohio	393 U.S. 221	1968
Cross v. Illinois	393 U.S. 221	1968
South Carolina Bd. of Ed. v. Brown	393 U.S. 222	1968
FTC v. Texaco Inc.	393 U.S. 223	1968
Oestereich v. Selective Serv. System	393 U.S. 233	1968
Johnson v. Bennett	393 U.S. 253	1968
Clark v. Gabriel	393 U.S. 256	1968
Household Goods Carriers' Bureau v. United States	393 U.S. 265	1968
Ogle v. Heim	393 U.S. 265	1968
Wilson v. Kelley	393 U.S. 266	1968
Standard Oil Co. v. City of Los Angeles	393 U.S. 267	1968
Thorpe v. Housing Authority	393 U.S. 268	1969
United States v. Nardello	393 U.S. 286	1969
United States v. Donruss Co.	393 U.S. 297	1969
Berger v. California	393 U.S. 314	1969
Boyd v. Clark	393 U.S. 316	1969
Markham Advertising Co. v. Washington	393 U.S. 316	1969
Freed v. Baldi	393 U.S. 317	1969
Bennett v. Cottingham	393 U.S. 317	1969
Estrin v. Moss	393 U.S. 318	1969
Ward v. Johnson	393 U.S. 318	1969
Williams & Co. v. City of Pittsburgh	393 U.S. 319	1969
Cox v. United States (1969)	393 U.S. 319	1969
Bennett v. Mississippi	393 U.S. 320	1969
Williams v. Virginia Bd. of Elections	393 U.S. 320	1969
Hilliard v. Gainesville	393 U.S. 321	1969
Mid-Valley Pipeline Co. v. King	393 U.S. 321	1969
Adkins Transfer Co. v. Dornbos	393 U.S. 322	1969
Brown v. Coiner	393 U.S. 322	1969
Snell v. Wyman	393 U.S. 323	1969
Glover v. St. L.-San Francisco R. Co.	393 U.S. 324	1969
United States v. Container Corp.	393 U.S. 333	1969
United States v. Augenblick	393 U.S. 348	1969
NLRB v. Strong	393 U.S. 357	1969
Gardner v. California	393 U.S. 367	1969
Smith v. Hooey	393 U.S. 374	1969
Hunter v. Erickson	393 U.S. 385	1969
Gorun v. Fall	393 U.S. 398	1969
Alabama State Teachers Assn. v. Alabama Public School & Coll. Authority	393 U.S. 400	1969
Sutton v. Adams	393 U.S. 404	1969
Backer v. Rockefeller	393 U.S. 404	1969
Alaska v. Operating Engineers	393 U.S. 405	1969
Valenti v. Rockefeller	393 U.S. 405	1969
Standard Fruit & S.S. Co. v. United Fruit Co.	393 U.S. 406	1969
Phillips v. Rockefeller	393 U.S. 406	1969
Stamler v. Willis	393 U.S. 407	1969
Dahl v. Republican State Committee	393 U.S. 408	1969
Dickinson v. First Nat'l Bank	393 U.S. 409	1969
Spinelli v. United States	393 U.S. 410	1969
Presbyterian Church v. Hull Church	393 U.S. 440	1969
SEC v. National Securities, Inc.	393 U.S. 453	1969
Skinner v. Louisiana	393 U.S. 473	1969
Commissioner v. Shaw-Walker Co.	393 U.S. 478	1969
Interstate Investors, Inc. v. United States	393 U.S. 479	1969
Provision Salesmen v. United States	393 U.S. 480	1969
Locust Club v. Rochester	393 U.S. 481	1969
Stewart v. Chicago Housing Authority	393 U.S. 482	1969
Johnson v. Avery	393 U.S. 483	1969
Tinker v. Des Moines Independent Community School Dist.	393 U.S. 503	1969
Serbian Orthodox Church v. Kelemen	393 U.S. 527	1969
Cordrey v. Cordrey	393 U.S. 527	1969
Md. & Va. Eldership v. Church of God	393 U.S. 528	1969
Becker v. Virginia	393 U.S. 528	1969
Morgan v. Board of Forestry	393 U.S. 529	1969
Foran v. Weinhoff	393 U.S. 529	1969
Baker Nat'l Bank v. Henderson	393 U.S. 530	1969
Accident Index Bureau, Inc. v. Male	393 U.S. 530	1969
Kohler v. Tugwell	393 U.S. 531	1969
Meeks v. Flourney	393 U.S. 531	1969
McCrory v. Mississippi	393 U.S. 532	1969
Bush v. United States	393 U.S. 532	1969
Duncan v Indiana	393 U.S. 533	1968
Triplett v. Circuit Court	393 U.S. 533	1969
Serta Associates, Inc. v. United States	393 U.S. 534	1969
National Industrial Traffic League v. United States	393 U.S. 535	1969
N.Y. Cent. R. Co. v. Lefkowitz	393 U.S. 536	1969
Dunbar-Stanley Studios, Inc. v. Alabama	393 U.S. 537	1969
Allen v. State Board of Elections	393 U.S. 544	1969
