= Hunter v. Erickson =

- Supreme Court of the United States

Argued November 13, 1968 Decided January 20, 1969
- Full case name: Hunter v. Erickson, Mayor of Akron, et al.
- Citations: 393 U.S. 385 (more) 89 S. Ct. 557; 21 L. Ed. 2d 616; 1969 U.S. LEXIS 2782; 47 Ohio Op. 2d 100

Case history
- Prior: 12 Ohio St. 2d 116 (reversed)

Holding
- An amendment of a city charter prohibiting racial discrimination except if decided by popular vote discriminates against minorities, and constitute a real, substantial, and invidious denial of the equal protection of the laws under the Fourteenth Amendment.

Court membership
- Chief Justice Earl Warren Associate Justices Hugo Black · William O. Douglas; John M. Harlan II · William J. Brennan Jr. Potter Stewart · Byron White; Abe Fortas · Thurgood Marshall

Case opinions
- Majority: White, joined by Warren, Douglas, Harlan, Brennan, Stewart, Fortas, Marshall
- Concurrence: Harlan, joined by Stewart
- Dissent: Black

Laws applied
- U.S. Const. amend. XIV

Hunter v. Erickson, 393 U.S. 385 (1969), was a United States Supreme Court case.

The question in the case was "whether the City of Akron, Ohio, has denied [a black citizen] the equal protection of its laws by amending the city charter to prevent the city council from implementing any ordinance dealing with racial, religious, or ancestral discrimination in housing without the approval of the majority of the voters of Akron."

The Court held an amendment of a city charter to discriminate against minorities, and constitute a real, substantial, and invidious denial of the equal protection of the laws under the Fourteenth Amendment.

This amendment provided that an ordinance enacted by the city council would not be effective unless approved by a majority of the city voters at a regular or general election, and that any such ordinance in effect at the time of the charter amendment shall cease to be effective until approved by the voters, a fair housing ordinance having in fact been previously enacted by the city council; that ordinance dealt with racial, religious, or ancestral discrimination in housing.

The amendment discriminated and violated the equal protection of the laws since, under the city's general system of enacting ordinances, an ordinance was effective a specified time after passage by the city council unless 10 percent of the voters petitioned for a referendum, and the amendment of the charter not only suspended the operation of the existing ordinance forbidding housing discrimination, but also made an explicit racial classification treating racial housing matters differently from other racial matters or other housing matters and made it more difficult to secure enactment of ordinances subject to the amendment, it being immaterial that the amendment drew no distinctions among racial and religious groups, since the amendment disadvantaged those who would benefit from laws barring racial, religious, or ancestral discriminations as against those who would bar other discriminations or who would otherwise regulate the real-estate market in their favor, and since the reality is that the law's impact falls on the minority and places special burdens on racial minorities within the governmental process.

== Background ==
=== Ohio law ===
The Akron City Council in 1964 enacted a fair housing ordinance premised on a recognition of the social and economic losses to society which flow from substandard, ghetto housing and its tendency to breed discrimination and segregation contrary to the policy of the city to "assure equal opportunity to all persons to live in decent housing facilities regardless of race, color, religion, ancestry or national origin." Akron Ordinance No. 873-1964 § 1. A Commission on Equal Opportunity in Housing was established by the ordinance in the office of the Mayor to enforce the antidiscrimination sections of the ordinance through conciliation or persuasion if possible, but, if not, then through "such order as the facts warrant," based upon a hearing at which witnesses may be subpoenaed, and entitled to enforcement in the courts. Akron Ordinance No. 873-1964, as amended by Akron Ordinance No. 926-1964.

=== Charter amendment ===
Thereafter, a proposal for an amendment to the city charter, which had been placed on the ballot by petition, was passed.

It provided that any ordinance (including any in effect) which regulates the use, sale, advertisement, transfer, listing assignment, lease, sublease, or financing of real property on the basis of race, color, religion, national origin, or ancestry must first be approved by a majority of the voters before becoming effective.

Ohio Rev. Code Ann. §§ 4112.02(H) and 4112.02(H)(1) (1967) makes it unlawful for "any person" to refuse to sell or otherwise deny or withhold commercial housing from any person because of the race or color of the prospective owner. "Commercial housing" is defined to exclude any personal residence offered for sale or rent by the owner or by his broker, salesman, agent, or employee. Ohio Rev. Code Ann. § 4112.01(K) (1967). The statute makes it unlawful to print, publish, or circulate any statement or advertisement relating to the sale of a personal residence that indicates any preference, limitation, specification, or discrimination based upon race. Ohio Rev. Code Ann. § 4112.02(H)(6) (1967).

=== Housing commission complaint ===
Seeking to invoke this machinery which had been established by the city for her benefit, Nellie Hunter addressed a complaint to the Commission asserting that a real estate agent had come to show her a list of houses for sale, but that on meeting Mrs. Hunter the agent "stated that she could not show me any of the houses on the list she had prepared for me because all of the owners had specified they did not wish their houses shown to negroes."

A buyer filed a complaint with the housing commission, asserting that she was denied equal housing opportunity in violation of the fair housing ordinance because she was black.

=== Commission's response ===
The commission refused to process the complaint because of the charter amendment. Mrs. Hunter's affidavit met with the reply that the fair housing ordinance was unavailable to her because of the charter amendment; the proposal for the charter amendment had been placed on the ballot at a general election upon petition of more than 10% of Akron's voters, and the amendment had been duly passed by a majority.

This amendment provided:

Any ordinance enacted by the Council of The City of Akron which regulates the use, sale, advertisement, transfer, listing assignment, lease, sublease or financing of real property of any kind or of any interest therein on the basis of race, color, religion, national origin or ancestry must first be approved by a majority of the electors voting on the question at a regular or general election before said ordinance shall be effective. Any such ordinance in effect at the time of the adoption of this section shall cease to be effective until approved by the electors as provided herein.

Akron City Charter § 137.

=== Court complaint ===
Appellant then brought an action in the Ohio courts on behalf of the municipality, herself, and all others similarly situated, to obtain a writ of mandamus requiring the Mayor to convene the Commission and to require the Commission and the Director of Law to enforce the fair housing ordinance and process her complaint thereunder with regard to her unsuccessful attempts to purchase a house through a real-estate agent.

=== First trial court decision ===
The trial court initially held that the enforcement provisions of the ordinance were invalid under state law.

However, the Supreme Court of Ohio reversed and remanded. (State ex rel. Hunter v. Erickson 6 Ohio St 2d 130, 35 Ohio Ops 2d 151, 216 NE2d 371 (1966)).

=== Second trial court decision ===
On remand, the trial court held that the fair housing ordinance had been rendered ineffective by a subsequent amendment of the city charter which provided that any ordinance enacted by the city council dealing with racial, religious, or ancestral discrimination in housing was not to be effective unless approved by a majority of the city voters at a regular or general election, and that any such ordinance in effect at the time of the charter amendment ceased to be effective until approved by the voters.

The trial court denied appellant's housing discrimination complaint, holding that the fair housing ordinance was rendered ineffective by the charter amendment.

=== Ohio Supreme Court ===
The Supreme Court of Ohio affirmed the trial court's ruling that a city's fair housing ordinance was rendered ineffective by a charter amendment, holding that the charter amendment was not repugnant to the Equal Protection Clause of the United States Constitution. (12 Ohio St 2d 116, 47 Ohio Ops 2d 100, 233 NE2d 129).

=== Certiorari and arguments ===
The case was argued on November 13, 1968.

== Opinion of the Court ==
On appeal, the Supreme Court of the United States reversed 8–1. Justice White wrote the opinion of the Court. The case was decided on January 20, 1969.

White wrote that the city charter amendment discriminated against minorities and constituted a denial of equal protection of the laws under the Fourteenth Amendment, since, under the city's general system of enacting ordinances, an ordinance was effective a specified time after passage by the city council unless 10 percent of the voters petitioned for a referendum, and the amendment of the charter not only suspended the operation of the existing fair housing ordinance, but also made an explicit racial classification treating racial housing matters differently from other racial matters and other housing matters, and made it more difficult to secure enactment of ordinances subject to the amendment, placing special burdens on racial minorities within the governmental process.

The Supreme Court held that the charter discriminated against minorities, and constituted a real, substantial, and invidious denial of the equal protection of the laws. Although the Civil Rights Act of 1968, Pub. L. 90-284, 82 Stat. 73, and Ohio Rev. Code Ann. § 4112 et seq. were related to open housing, they were not intended to preempt local housing ordinances or provide rights and remedies that were effective substitutes for the ordinance. The case could not be considered moot since the ordinance provided an enforcement mechanism unmatched by either state or federal legislation. The city charter placed special burdens on racial minorities within the governmental process, which was not permissible. The mayor was subject to those constitutional limitations that had been duly adopted and remain unrepealed.

Held:

1. The case is not moot. Neither the 1968 Civil Rights Act (which specifically preserves local fair housing laws), nor the 1866 Civil Rights Act, was intended to pre-empt local housing ordinances; the Ohio Act of October 30, 1965 (which concerns "commercial" housing), does not apply to this case; and the Akron ordinance provides an enforcement mechanism unmatched by either state or federal legislation. pp. 388–389.

2. The charter amendment contains an explicitly racial classification treating racial housing matters differently from other racial and housing matters and places special burdens on racial and religious minorities within the governmental process by making it more difficult for them to secure legislation on their behalf. pp. 389–391.

3. Racial classifications "bear a heavier burden of justification" than other classifications, and here Akron has not justified its discrimination against minorities, which constitutes a denial of the equal protection of the laws. pp. 391–393.

=== Concurrence ===
Justice Harlan, joined by Justice Stewart, concurred, stating that he joined in the court's opinion, and that the charter amendment was not an attempt to allocate governmental power on the basis of any general or neutral principle, but had the clear purpose of making it more difficult for certain racial and religious minorities to achieve legislation that was in their interest.

=== Dissent ===
Justice Black dissented, expressing the view that there was no constitutional provision barring a state from repealing a law, and that the equal protection clause did not empower the court to decide that the fair housing ordinance could not be repealed by the city charter amendment.

== See also ==
- Civil Rights Act of 1968, tit. VIII, §§ 815, 810(c), 82 Stat. 89, 86.
- Civil Rights Act of 1866
