= Williams v. Rhodes =

- Supreme Court of the United States

Argued October 7, 1968 Decided October 15, 1968
- Full case name: Williams et al. v. Rhodes, Governor of Ohio et al.
- Citations: 393 U.S. 23 (more) 89 S. Ct. 5; 21 L. Ed. 2d 24; 1968 U.S. LEXIS 2959; 45 Ohio Op. 2d 236

Case history
- Prior: 290 F. Supp. 983 (S.D. Ohio 1968)

Holding
- Ohio's restrictive election laws, taken as a whole, were invidiously discriminatory and violated the Equal Protection Clause because they gave the two old, established parties a decided advantage over new parties. Judgment of the District Court affirmed with reference to the Socialist Labor Party case, but modified in the Independent Party case.

Court membership
- Chief Justice Earl Warren Associate Justices Hugo Black · William O. Douglas; John M. Harlan II · William J. Brennan Jr. Potter Stewart · Byron White; Abe Fortas · Thurgood Marshall

Case opinions
- Majority: Black, joined by Douglas, Brennan, Fortas, Marshall
- Concurrence: Douglas
- Concurrence: Harlan (in judgment only)
- Concur/dissent: White
- Concur/dissent: Stewart
- Dissent: Warren

Laws applied
- U.S. Const. amends. I, XIV

Williams v. Rhodes, 393 U.S. 23 (1968), is a decision by the United States Supreme Court which held that Ohio had violated the equal protection rights under the Fourteenth Amendment of two political parties by refusing to print their candidates' names on the ballot.

== Background ==
=== Facts ===
Separate suits were brought by the American Independent Party and the Socialist Labor Party, challenging the validity of Ohio election laws insofar as they precluded the parties' being placed on the ballots to choose electors pledged to particular candidates for the presidency and vice presidency of the United States; the attack on the validity of these laws rested on the ground that they violated the equal protection clause of the Fourteenth Amendment—on the ground that they denied plaintiffs and the voters who might wish to vote for them the equal protection of the laws, guaranteed against state abridgment by the Equal Protection Clause of U.S. Const. amend. XIV.

Under the Ohio election laws, a new political party seeking ballot position in presidential elections must obtain petitions signed by qualified electors totaling 15% of the number of ballots cast in the last gubernatorial election and must file these petitions early in February of the election year. These requirements and other restrictive statutory provisions virtually preclude a new party's qualifying for ballot position and no provision exists for independent candidates doing so. The Republican and Democratic parties may retain their ballot positions by polling 10% of the votes in the last gubernatorial election and need not obtain signature petitions. The Ohio American Independent Party (an appellant in No. 543), was formed in January 1968, and during the next six months by securing over 450,000 signatures exceeded the 15% requirement but was denied ballot position because the February deadline had expired. The Socialist Labor Party (an appellant in No. 544), an old party with a small membership, could not meet the 15% requirement. Both Parties brought actions challenging the Ohio election laws as violating the Equal Protection Clause of the Fourteenth Amendment.

=== District court ===
A three-judge District Court held those laws unconstitutional and ruled that the parties were entitled to write-in space but not ballot position.

In both cases, the United States District Court for the Southern District of Ohio ruled that the restrictive Ohio election laws unconstitutional but refused to grant the plaintiffs the full relief they had sought. It held that a series of restrictive Ohio election laws resulted in a denial of equal protection of the laws but refused to grant plaintiffs the full relief they sought against defendants, a governor and associated individuals. The District Court, composed of three judges, held the election laws unconstitutional, and granted relief only to the extent of allowing write-in ballots, but refused to order the names of the parties to be printed on the ballots. (290 F Supp 983.)

=== Interlocutory relief ===
The parties appealed to the Supreme Court. The independent party immediately sought interlocutory relief from Justice Stewart, which he granted by order after a hearing at which Ohio represented that it could place the party's name on the ballot without disrupting the election if there was not a long delay. Several days after that order the Socialist Labor Party sought a stay which he denied because of that party's failure to move quickly for relief, the state having represented that at that time the granting of relief would disrupt the election.

Immediately after entry of the District Court's judgment, the American Independent Party sought and obtained from Justice Stewart, as Circuit Justice, an injunction ordering the party's candidates to be placed on the ballot pending appeal. (21 L Ed 2d 69, 89 S Ct 1.) A like motion filed by the Socialist Labor Party several days later was denied by the Circuit Justice because of the party's failure to move quickly to obtain relief. (21 L Ed 2d 72, 89 S Ct 3.)

=== Certiorari and arguments ===
Both parties appealed. October 7, 1968, Argued.

== Opinion of the court ==
On appeal, the Supreme Court of the United States affirmed in the Socialist Labor Case, but modified the District Court's judgment in the American Independent Party Case, granting that party the right to have its name printed on the ballot. Black wrote for a 5-4 court.

The Court held that defendants had failed to show any "compelling interest" that would justify imposing heavy burdens on the right to vote and to associate. The totality of the Ohio restrictive laws imposed a burden on voting and associational rights, which the court held was invidious discrimination in violation of the Equal Protection Clause.

It was held that (1) the equal protection clause was violated by the Ohio election laws, which made it virtually impossible for any party except the Republican and Democratic Parties to qualify on the ballot, and (2) the American Independent Party was, and the Socialist Labor Party was not, entitled to have its name placed on the ballots, because the former promptly sought injunctive relief in the United States Supreme Court, thus avoiding interruption of the state's electoral process, and the latter delayed in seeking such relief.

Held:

1. The controversy in these cases is justiciable. P. 28.

2. State laws enacted pursuant to Art. II, § 1, of the Constitution to regulate the selection of electors must meet the requirements of the Equal Protection Clause of the Fourteenth Amendment. pp. 28–29.

3. Ohio's restrictive election laws taken as a whole are invidiously discriminatory and violate the Equal Protection Clause because they give the two old, established parties a decided advantage over new parties. pp. 30–34.

(a) The state laws here involved heavily burden the right of individuals to associate for the advancement of political beliefs and the right of qualified voters to cast their votes effectively. pp. 30–31.

(b) The State has shown no "compelling interest" justifying those burdens. pp. 31–32.

4. Under the circumstances here Ohio must allow the Independent Party and its candidates for president and Vice President to remain on the ballot, subject to compliance with valid state laws. Ohio is not at this late date required to place the Socialist Labor Party on the ballot for the coming election. pp. 34–35.

== Other opinions ==
=== Concurrence ===
Justice Douglas, in a separate opinion, with emphasis somewhat different from the court's, joined in the court's opinion.

=== Concurrence with results ===
Justice Harlan concurred in the results, but would rest the decision entirely on the proposition that Ohio's statutory scheme violated the basic rights of political association assured by the First Amendment, which are protected against state infringement under the due process clause of the Fourteenth Amendment.

=== Concurrence/dissents ===
Justice Stewart dissented with respect to the American Independent Party, expressing the view that the Ohio election laws were within the power of the Ohio legislature. However, he concurred in No. 544 in the denial of equitable relief to the Socialist Labor Party.

Justice White also dissented with respect to the American Independent Party, expressing the view that neither the due process clause nor the equal protection clause of the Fourteenth Amendment prohibited Ohio from requiring that the appointment of presidential electors be carried out through the political party process, and concurred in No. 544 insofar as the Socialist Party was denied relief in the Supreme Court.

=== Dissent ===
Chief Justice Warren dissented, expressing the view that Ohio should not be compelled to place the candidates of either the American Independent Party or the Socialist Labor Party on the ballot for the impending presidential election. As regards the latter party, he would remand to the District Court for a clearer determination of the serious constitutional questions raised in the instant cases.

== See also ==
- List of United States Supreme Court cases, volume 393
