= Lewis v. Casey =

- Supreme Court of the United States

Argued November 29, 1995 Decided June 24, 1996
- Full case name: Lewis v. Casey
- Citations: 518 U.S. 343 (more)

Holding
- Bounds v. Smith did not create an abstract, freestanding right for incarcerated people to access a law library or legal assistance.

Court membership
- Chief Justice William Rehnquist Associate Justices John P. Stevens · Sandra Day O'Connor; Antonin Scalia · Anthony Kennedy; David Souter · Clarence Thomas; Ruth Bader Ginsburg · Stephen Breyer

Case opinions
- Majority: Scalia, joined by Rehnquist, O'Connor, Kennedy, and Thomas; Souter, Ginsburg, and Breyer (Part I and III)
- Concurrence: Thomas
- Concur/dissent: Souter, joined by Ginsburg and Breyer
- Dissent: Stevens

Lewis v. Casey, 518 U.S. 343 (1996), was a United States Supreme Court case in which the court held that Bounds v. Smith did not create an abstract, freestanding right for incarcerated people to access a law library or legal assistance.

== Background ==
People incarcerated in various prisons operated by the Arizona Department of Corrections (ADOC) brought a class action against ADOC officials, alleging that the officials were furnishing them with inadequate legal-research facilities and thereby depriving them of their right of access to the courts, in violation of Bounds v. Smith. The federal district court found the prisons to be in violation of Bounds and issued an injunction mandating detailed, systemwide changes in ADOC's prison law libraries and in its legal assistance programs. The Ninth Circuit Court of Appeals affirmed both the finding of a Bounds violation and the injunction's major terms.

== Decision ==
Justice Scalia, writing for the court, stated: "In other words, Bounds does not guarantee inmates the wherewithal to transform themselves into litigating engines capable of filing everything from shareholder derivative actions to slip-and-fall claims. The tools it requires to be provided are those that the inmates need in order to attack their sentences, directly or collaterally, and in order to challenge the conditions of their confinement. Impairment of any other litigating capacity is simply one of the incidental (and perfectly constitutional) consequences of conviction and incarceration." Chief Justice Rehnquist, who authored the dissent in Bounds v. Smith as an associate justice, joined in the court's opinion in Lewis v. Casey.
