= Allen v. State Board of Elections =

- Supreme Court of the United States

Argued October 15, 1968 Decided March 3, 1969
- Full case name: Richard Allen et al., Appellants v. State Board of Elections et al. J. C. Fairley et al., Appellants, v. Joe T. Patterson et al. Charles E. Bunton et al., Appellants, v. Joe T. Patterson et al. Clifton Whitley et al., Appellants, v. John Bell Williams et al.
- Citations: 393 U.S. 544 (more) 89 S. Ct. 817; 22 L. Ed. 2d 1
- Argument: Oral argument

Case history
- Prior: No. 36, Whitley v. Williams, S.D. Mis. Whitley v. Johnson, 260 F. Supp. 630, S.D. Mis. Allen v. State Board of Elections, 268 F. Supp. 218, E.D. Va.

Holding
- Section 5 of the Voting Rights Act of 1965 authorizes a private right of action based on the remedial aims of the law. Preclearance provisions are applicable to all changes which “alter the election laws of a covered state even in a minor way”.

Court membership
- Chief Justice Earl Warren Associate Justices Hugo Black · William O. Douglas; John M. Harlan II · William J. Brennan Jr. Potter Stewart · Byron White; Abe Fortas · Thurgood Marshall

Case opinions
- Majority: Warren, joined by Douglas, Brennan, White, Stewart, Fortas, Marshall
- Concur/dissent: Harlan
- Dissent: Black

Laws applied
- Voting Rights Act of 1965

Allen v. State Board of Elections, 393 U.S. 544 (1969), was a United States Supreme Court case where the Court ruled by a 7–2 majority that the Voting Rights Act of 1965 authorizes private suits of action.

== Background ==
The Voting Rights Act of 1965 covered all of Mississippi and Virginia because of those states’ long history of voting discrimination against African Americans, as well as poor whites, during the Jim Crow era. Following the Act, black and poor white voter registration in both states increased enormously.

However, during the 1966 elections, Virginia refused to count some handwritten write-in votes, whilst at the same time in Mississippi a lawsuit was filed against the state's election board for at-large election of county supervisors, and in eleven of the state's eighty-two counties, appointing all superintendents of education. Mississippi also changed the process for independent candidates running in general elections. Both these were challenged as violations of the Voting Rights Act in the respective District Courts. In Mississippi, the District Court ordered the relevant candidates to be placed on the 1966 general election ballot, but dismissed the remaining claims completely. In Virginia, the District Court ruled that requirements for write-in votes to be in the voter's own handwriting was not unconstitutional, and that the requirements for write-in votes were not a violation of the Voting Rights Act as they were not a “test” or “device”.

== Case opinion ==
Following the judgment of the two District Courts, there were multiple attempts to appeal to higher courts in 1967 and 1968, but attempts to have the case heard in the circuit courts failed and it was the 1968 Supreme Court term before any appeal was actually heard. By this time the two cases, almost three years old when heard in the Supreme Court, had been combined into one.

=== Majority opinion ===
In a 7—2 decision by Chief Justice Earl Warren, the Court reversed both District Courts, stating that preclearance provisions of the Voting Rights Act were applicable to all changes altering the election laws of covered states, and that no person could be deprived of the ballot for failing to comply with a new provision in a covered jurisdiction, even if they do not effect qualifications for accessing the ballot.

== Aftermath ==
Following Allen, elections for the Richmond City Council would be suspended between 1971 and 1976 as a result of annexation of overwhelmingly white parts of Chesterfield County by the city. The District Court for the Eastern District of Virginia made this decision because these annexations were viewed as reducing black voting power regardless of the actual motive behind them.

== See also ==
- List of United States Supreme Court cases, volume 393
