= Congressional power of enforcement =

Aspect of US legal history

A congressional power of enforcement is included in a number of amendments to the United States Constitution. The language "The Congress shall have power to enforce this article by appropriate legislation" is used, with slight variations, in Amendments XIII, XIV, XV, XIX, XXIII, XXIV, and XXVI.

The variations in the pertinent language are as follows:

- The Fourteenth Amendment states "The Congress shall have power to enforce, by appropriate legislation, the provisions of this article."
- The Eighteenth Amendment states "The Congress and the several States shall have concurrent power to enforce this article by appropriate legislation."

== Initial creation and use ==
These provisions made their first appearance in the Thirteenth, Fourteenth and Fifteenth Amendments, which were adopted during the Reconstruction period primarily to abolish slavery and protect the rights of the newly emancipated African-Americans. The enforcement provisions contained in these amendments extend the powers of Congress originally enumerated in Article One, Section 8 of the Constitution, and have the effect of increasing the power of Congress and diminishing that of the individual states. They led to the "Enforcement Acts" of 1870 and 1871. Congress had only that power delegated (granted, given) to it by the Constitution.

== Use in the courts ==
Interpretation of the Fourteenth Amendment's enforcement provision has been the subject of several important Supreme Court cases, which reflect the tension between the courts' role of interpreting the Constitution and Congress's power of adopting legislation to enforce specific Constitutional amendments.

Early on, in the Civil Rights Cases decided in 1883, the Supreme Court concluded that the Congressional enforcement power in Section 5 of the Fourteenth Amendment did not authorize Congress to use the Privileges or Immunities Clause of that amendment to ban racial discrimination in public accommodations operated by private persons, such as inns and theaters. The court stated that since the Fourteenth Amendment only restricted state action, Congress lacked power under this amendment to forbid discrimination that was not sponsored by the state. This ruling has not been overturned, although in modern times, similar civil rights legislation has been upheld under Congress's power to regulate interstate commerce under Article One, Section 8 of the Constitution. See Civil Rights Act of 1964.

In the Katzenbach v. Morgan case, decided in 1966, the Supreme Court concluded that Congress can forbid practices that are not themselves unconstitutional, if the law is aimed at preventing or remedying constitutional violations. On that basis, the court upheld a provision of the Voting Rights Act that prevented states from using English language literacy tests as qualifications for voting. The court decided that the law was a valid exercise of Congress's enforcement power under the Equal Protection Clause of the Fourteenth Amendment, because it was aimed at remedying state-sponsored discrimination, despite an earlier court finding that a literacy test was not in and of itself a violation of the 14th Amendment.

In 1970, however, in Oregon v. Mitchell, the court held that Congress had exceeded its power by attempting to require the states to reduce the voting age to 18. This led to adoption of the Twenty-Sixth Amendment to the Constitution in 1971, which provided that the states could not set a minimum voting age higher than 18.

In the 1997 case of City of Boerne v. Flores, the court again took a narrow view of the Congressional power of enforcement, striking down a provision of the Religious Freedom Restoration Act (RFRA) that sought to forbid the states from placing burdens on religious practice in the absence of a compelling state interest in doing so. In enacting RFRA, Congress had sought to overturn the 1988 Supreme Court decision in Employment Division v. Smith, which had held that the Constitution does not require states to recognize religious exemptions to laws of general applicability. In the Boerne case, the Supreme Court decided that RFRA overstepped Congress's authority, because the statute was not sufficiently connected to the goal of remedying a constitutional violation, but instead created new rights that are not guaranteed by the Constitution. Some observers have suggested that the Supreme Court saw RFRA as a threat to the court's institutional power and an incursion on its role as final arbiter of the meaning of the Constitution, because that statute was aimed specifically at overturning the Employment Division v. Smith decision. However, the effect of Boerne lasted beyond Boerne itself. The standard announced in that case—that all legislation enacted under Section 5 of the Fourteenth Amendment must be "congruent and proportional" to the unconstitutional harm it seeks to remedy—has been followed by every post-Boerne decision on legislation that sought to abrogate the states' sovereign immunity.

United States v. Morrison, decided in 2000, is one controversial successor case. In that case, the Supreme Court, applying the congruent-and-proportional Boerne test, overturned provisions of the Violence Against Women Act (VAWA), which created federal civil jurisdiction over gender-based violence. The court held that Congress did not have the power to enact a remedy targeting private action rather than state action, and that it could not enact a Section 5 remedy without findings of national, or near-national, harm.
