= Acquittal =

Legal result of a "not guilty" verdict

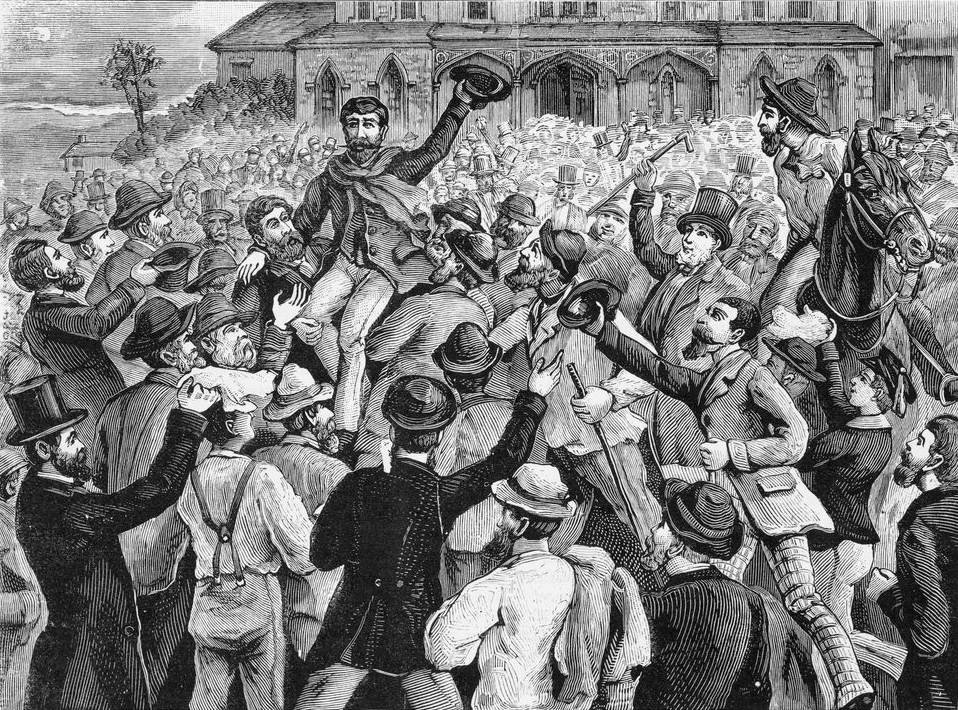
The acquittal of the defendants in the Eureka Rebellion is celebrated by community members.

In common law jurisdictions, an acquittal means that the criminal prosecution has failed to prove that the accused is guilty beyond a reasonable doubt of the charge presented. It certifies that the accused is free from the charge of an offense, as far as criminal law is concerned. The finality of an acquittal is dependent on the jurisdiction. In some countries, such as the United States, an acquittal prohibits the retrial of the accused for the same offense, even if new evidence surfaces that further implicates the accused. The effect of an acquittal on criminal proceedings is the same whether it results from a jury verdict or results from the operation of some other rule that discharges the accused. In other countries, like Australia, Canada and the UK, the prosecuting authority may appeal an acquittal similar to how a defendant may appeal a conviction — but usually only if new and compelling evidence comes to light or the accused has interfered with or intimidated a juror or witness.

== Canada ==
In Canada, the prosecution may appeal different types of decisions, judgments, or orders in criminal cases.

Under Section 676(1) of the Criminal Code of Canada, the Crown may appeal against:

- A judgment or verdict of acquittal or a verdict of not criminally responsible on account of mental disorder of a trial court in proceedings by indictment on any ground of appeal that involves a question of law alone. [s. 676(1)(a)]
- An order of a superior court of criminal jurisdiction that quashes an indictment or in any manner refuses or fails to exercise jurisdiction on an indictment. [s. 676(1)(b)]
- An order of a trial court that stays proceedings on an indictment or quashes an indictment. [s. 676(1)(c)]
- The sentence passed by a trial court in proceedings by indictment, unless that sentence is one fixed by law, if leave of the court of appeal or a judge thereof is given. [s. 676(1)(d)]

Under section 676(1.1), the prosecution may, with leave of the court of appeal or a judge thereof, appeal against an acquittal in a summary offence proceeding or a sentence passed with respect to a summary conviction as if the summary offence proceeding was a proceeding by indictment if there was no appeal with respect to the summary conviction, the summary conviction offence was tried with an indictable offence, and there was an appeal in respect of the indictable offence.

Section 676(2) defines an acquittal as "an acquittal in respect of an offence specifically charged where the accused has, on the trial thereof, been convicted or discharged under section 730 of any other offence."

The prosecution may also appeal a decision where the judge imposes a sentence which is less than that required by law, where the judge does not impose a sentencing order, or where the judge does not impose a sentence of life imprisonment without parole for murder (the last provision being unconstitutional as concerning R. v. Bissonnette)

== Scotland ==
Scots law previously had two acquittal verdicts: not guilty and not proven. Secondary legislation laid before the Scottish Parliament in December 2025 provided for the abolition of the not proven verdict on 1 January 2026.

== England and Wales ==
In England and Wales, which share a common legal system, the Criminal Justice Act 2003 creates an exception to the double jeopardy rule, by providing that retrials may be ordered if "new and compelling evidence" comes to light after an acquittal for a serious crime. Also, the Criminal Procedure and Investigations Act 1996 permits a "tainted acquittal" to be set aside in circumstances where it is proved beyond reasonable doubt that an acquittal has been obtained by violence or threats of violence to a witness or juror/s.

In modern England and Wales, and in all countries that substantially follow English criminal procedure, an acquittal normally results in the immediate liberation of the defendant from custody, assuming no other charges against the defendant remain to be tried. However, until 1774, a defendant acquitted by an English or Welsh court would be remanded to jail until he had paid the jailer for the costs of his confinement. It was known for acquitted persons to die in jail for lack of jailer's fees.

== United States ==
With one exception, the prosecution in the United States cannot appeal an acquittal because of constitutional prohibitions against double jeopardy. The U.S. Supreme Court has ruled:

If the judgment is upon an acquittal, the defendant, indeed, will not seek to have it reversed, and the government cannot. U.S. v. Sanges, 144 U.S. 310 (1892). Ball v. U.S., 163 U.S. 662, 671 (1896)

A verdict of acquittal, although not followed by any judgment, is a bar to a subsequent prosecution for the same offense. Ball, supra, at 672.

Society's awareness of the heavy personal strain which a criminal trial represents for the individual defendant is manifested in the willingness to limit the Government to a single criminal proceeding to vindicate its very vital interest in enforcement of criminal laws. United States v. Jorn, 400 U.S. 470, 479 (1971)

Whether the trial is to a jury or, as here, to the bench, subjecting the defendant to postacquittal factfinding proceedings going to guilt or innocence violates the Double Jeopardy Clause. Smalis v. Pennsylvania, 476 U.S. 140 (1986)

It was decided in Fong Foo v. United States, 369 U.S. 141 (1962) that the prosecution cannot appeal a judgment of acquittal by a jury. In United States v. Jenkins, 420 U.S. 358 (1975), this was held applicable to bench trials. In Arizona v. Rumsey, 467 U.S. 203 (1984), it was ruled that in a bench trial, when a judge was holding a separate hearing after the jury trial, to decide if the defendant should be sentenced to death or life imprisonment, the judge decided that the circumstances of the case did not permit death to be imposed. On appeal, the judge's ruling was found to be erroneous. However, even though the decision to impose a life sentence instead of death was based on the judge's incorrect interpretation of the law, the finding of life imprisonment in the original case constituted an acquittal of the death penalty. Thus, death could not be imposed upon a subsequent trial. Even though the acquittal of the death penalty was erroneous in that case, the acquittal must stand.

The only exception to an acquittal being final is if the defendant was never in actual jeopardy. If a defendant bribes a judge and obtains acquittal due to a bench trial, the acquittal is invalid because the defendant was never in jeopardy in the first place. Harry Aleman v. Judges of the Criminal Division, Circuit Court of Cook County, Illinois, et al., 138 F.3d 302 (7th Cir. 1998).

An acquittal, while conclusive as to the criminal law, does not necessarily bar private civil actions in tort or on some other grounds as a result of the facts alleged in the charge. For example, the City of Los Angeles was held liable in 1994 for the 1991 Rodney King beating despite state acquittals in 1992 of all of its four main LAPD defendants, and in 1997 O. J. Simpson was held civilly liable for wrongful death even after being tried and acquitted in 1995 of murder. An acquittal also does not bar prosecution for the same offenses under a statute of a different jurisdiction. For example, in the United States, someone acquitted of a state murder charge can be retried for the same actions on a federal charge of violating civil rights, and police acquitted of a state charge of felonious assault, as in the Rodney King case, can likewise be tried on federal civil rights charges.

== The effect of acquittals on criminal records ==
An acquittal does not mean the defendant is innocent of the charge presented—only that the prosecutor failed to prove that the defendant was guilty beyond a reasonable doubt.

The charge may remain on the defendant's criminal record in the United States even after an acquittal, depending on the state regulations. A federal criminal record may include acquittals, case dismissals, and convictions.

In the UK, police forces can reveal whether individuals have been acquitted of criminal charges when issuing information for enhanced record checks, according to a 2018 Supreme Court ruling.

Depending on one's location, a background check may highlight not only convictions or plea bargains but also arrests, charges that were dropped or dismissed, and acquittals.

== Acquittal vs "Not Guilty" ==
Although the term "acquittal" is often used to describe a verdict of "not guilty", in more technical terms a not guilty verdict is the formal decision by the judge or jury that the prosecution has not proved the defendant's guilt beyond a reasonable doubt, and an acquittal is the legal consequence of that determination in the form of a court order clearing the defendant of the charges. Some jurisdictions differentiate between an acquittal that reflects a verdict in favor of a defendant and a "full acquittal" that establishes a defendant's innocence.

"Not guilty" also refers to a type of plea in a criminal case.

== Partial acquittal ==
When multiple charges are filed against a defendant, and a judge or jury finds the defendant not guilty of some charges but guilty of others, the defendant is said to have received a "partial acquittal". The defendant will then be sentenced for the charges that did not result in acquittal.

== See also ==
- Blackstone's ratio
- Category:Criminal trials that ended in acquittal
