= List of United States Supreme Court cases, volume 400 =

This is a list of all the United States Supreme Court cases from volume 400 of the United States Reports:

Case name	Citation	Date decided
McCann v. Babbitz	400 U.S. 1	1970
Hanemann v. Florida	400 U.S. 2	1970
Hall v. United States	400 U.S. 2	1970
L.A. Herald-Examiner v. Kennedy	400 U.S. 3	1970
United States v. Md. Savings-Share Ins. Corp.	400 U.S. 4	1970
United States v. City of Chicago	400 U.S. 8	1970
Colombo v. New York	400 U.S. 16	1970
Thompson v. United States (1970)	400 U.S. 17	1970
Lines v. Frederick	400 U.S. 18	1970
Odom v. United States	400 U.S. 23	1970
North Carolina v. Alford	400 U.S. 25	1970
Fornaris v. Ridge Tool Co.	400 U.S. 41	1970
Arnold Tours, Inc. v. Camp	400 U.S. 45	1970
Hickel v. Oil Shale Corp.	400 U.S. 48	1970
Marine Terminal Ass'n v. Rederiaktiebolaget Transatlantic	400 U.S. 62	1970
Atlantic City Elec. Co. v. United States	400 U.S. 73	1970
Dutton v. Evans	400 U.S. 74	1970
Oregon v. Mitchell	400 U.S. 112	1970
NLRB v. Operating Engineers	400 U.S. 297	1971
Wyman v. James	400 U.S. 309	1971
Decker v. Harper & Row Publishers, Inc.	400 U.S. 348	1971
Bruno v. Pennsylvania	400 U.S. 350	1971
U.S. Bulk Carriers, Inc. v. Arguelles	400 U.S. 351	1971
Perkins v. Matthews	400 U.S. 379	1971
Blount v. Rizzi	400 U.S. 410	1971
Kennerly v. Dist. Ct.	400 U.S. 423	1971
Wisconsin v. Constantineau	400 U.S. 433	1971
Procunier v. Atchley	400 U.S. 446	1971
Mayberry v. Pennsylvania	400 U.S. 455	1971
United States v. Jorn	400 U.S. 470	1971
Usner v. Luckenbach Overseas Corp.	400 U.S. 494	1971
Groppi v. Wisconsin	400 U.S. 505	1971
Donaldson v. United States	400 U.S. 517	1971
Phillips v. Martin Marietta Corp.	400 U.S. 542	1971
Piccirillo v. New York	400 U.S. 548	1971
Rockefeller v. Socialist Workers Party	400 U.S. 1201	1970
Davis v. Adams	400 U.S. 1203	1970
Fowler v. Adams	400 U.S. 1205	1970
Dexter v. Schrunk	400 U.S. 1207	1970
Marcello v. United States	400 U.S. 1208	1970
Harris v. United States	400 U.S. 1211	1970
