= List of United States Supreme Court cases, volume 360 =

This is a list of all the United States Supreme Court cases from volume 360 of the United States Reports:

| Case name | Citation | Date decided |
|---|---|---|
| Smith v. United States (1959) | 360 U.S. 1 | 1959 |
| United States v. Atl. Refining Co. | 360 U.S. 19 | 1959 |
| La. Power & Light Co. v. City of Thibodaux | 360 U.S. 25 | 1959 |
| Lassiter v. Northampton County Board of Elections | 360 U.S. 45 | 1959 |
| FTC v. Simplicity Pattern Co. | 360 U.S. 55 | 1959 |
| Uphaus v. Wyman | 360 U.S. 72 | 1959 |
| Barenblatt v. United States | 360 U.S. 109 | 1959 |
| Harrison v. NAACP | 360 U.S. 167 | 1959 |
| Allegheny Cnty. v. Frank Mashuda Co. | 360 U.S. 185 | 1959 |
| NLRB v. Cabot Carbon Co. | 360 U.S. 203 | 1959 |
| Martin v. Creasy | 360 U.S. 219 | 1959 |
| Mills v. Louisiana | 360 U.S. 230 | 1959 |
| NAACP v. Alabama ex rel. Patterson | 360 U.S. 240 | 1959 |
| Ohio ex rel. Eaton v. Price | 360 U.S. 246 | 1959 |
| Ford Motor Co. v. Park | 360 U.S. 251 | 1959 |
| Burns v. Ohio | 360 U.S. 252 | 1959 |
| Napue v. Illinois | 360 U.S. 264 | 1959 |
| Magenau v. Aetna Freight Lines, Inc. | 360 U.S. 273 | 1959 |
| Anonymous v. Baker | 360 U.S. 287 | 1959 |
| NLRB v. Fant Milling Co. | 360 U.S. 301 | 1959 |
| Marshall v. United States | 360 U.S. 310 | 1959 |
| Petersen v. California | 360 U.S. 314 | 1959 |
| Ortega v. Bibb | 360 U.S. 314 | 1959 |
| Spano v. New York | 360 U.S. 315 | 1959 |
| United States v. 93.970 Acres of Land | 360 U.S. 328 | 1959 |
| Safeway Stores, Inc. v. Okla. Retail Grocers Ass'n, Inc. | 360 U.S. 334 | 1959 |
| Palermo v. United States | 360 U.S. 343 | 1959 |
| Rosenberg v. United States | 360 U.S. 367 | 1959 |
| Atl. Refining Co. v. Pub. Serv. Comm'n | 360 U.S. 378 | 1959 |
| Pitts. Plate Glass Co. v. United States | 360 U.S. 395 | 1959 |
| Sw. Sugar & Molasses Co. v. River Terminals Corp. | 360 U.S. 411 | 1959 |
| Raley v. Ohio | 360 U.S. 423 | 1959 |
| Comm'r v. Hansen | 360 U.S. 446 | 1959 |
| Lev v. United States | 360 U.S. 470 | 1959 |
| NAACP v. Bennett | 360 U.S. 471 | 1959 |
| Cofield v. United States | 360 U.S. 472 | 1959 |
| Bellew v. Mississippi | 360 U.S. 473 | 1959 |
| McDaniel v. Rose | 360 U.S. 473 | 1959 |
| Greene v. McElroy | 360 U.S. 474 | 1959 |
| Farmers v. WDAY, Inc. | 360 U.S. 525 | 1959 |
| Pa. R.R. Co. v. Day | 360 U.S. 548 | 1959 |
| Barr v. Matteo | 360 U.S. 564 | 1959 |
| Howard v. Lyons | 360 U.S. 593 | 1959 |
| Union Pac. R.R. Co. v. Price | 360 U.S. 601 | 1959 |
| In re Sawyer | 360 U.S. 622 | 1959 |
| Ingram v. United States | 360 U.S. 672 | 1959 |
| Kingsley Int'l Pictures Corp. v. Univ. of N. Y. | 360 U.S. 684 | 1959 |
| Taylor v. McElroy | 360 U.S. 709 | 1959 |
| Illinois v. Michigan | 360 U.S. 712 | 1959 |
| United States v. Hine Pontiac | 360 U.S. 715 | 1959 |
| United States v. Colonial Chevrolet Corp. | 360 U.S. 716 | 1959 |
| Kelley v. Richmond | 360 U.S. 716 | 1959 |
| Hershey Mfg. Co. v. Adamowski | 360 U.S. 717 | 1959 |
| DeGregory v. Wyman | 360 U.S. 717 | 1959 |
