= Spano v. New York =

- Supreme Court of the United States

Argued April 27, 1959 Decided June 22, 1959
- Full case name: Spano v. New York
- Citations: 360 U.S. 315 (more) 79 S. Ct. 1202; 3 L. Ed. 2d 1265; 1959 U.S. LEXIS 751

Case history
- Prior: 4 N.Y.2d 256, 173 N.Y.S.2d 793, 150 N.E.2d 226

Holding
- The Court held that the interrogation violated Spano's 14th Amendment due process rights because Spano's confession was not voluntary.

Court membership
- Chief Justice Earl Warren Associate Justices Hugo Black · Felix Frankfurter; William O. Douglas · Tom C. Clark; John M. Harlan II · William J. Brennan Jr. Charles E. Whittaker · Potter Stewart

Case opinions
- Majority: Warren
- Concurrence: Douglas, joined by Black, Brennan
- Concurrence: Stewart, joined by Douglas, Brennan

Laws applied
- Fifth Amendment

Spano v. New York, 360 U.S. 315 (1959), represented the Supreme Court's movement away from the amorphous voluntariness standard for determining whether police violated due process standards when eliciting confessions and towards the modern rule in Miranda v. Arizona. In Spano, the Court focused less on factors such as meals provided to the accused and more on whether the accused had access to legal counsel.

== Case ==
Vincent Spano was a 25-year-old immigrant with a junior high school education. He shot a person after a bar fight. He fled the crime scene and was indicted for murder while he was in hiding. Spano called Gaspar Bruno, a close friend of his who was training to become a police officer. Spano told Bruno that the deceased had injured him, and that he intended to get a lawyer and turn himself in to law enforcement. Bruno relayed the information to his superiors. Spano, along with his newly appointed attorney, turned himself in the day following his conversation with Bruno.

Spano was questioned continuously for several hours and was told he could not consult with his attorney. The police provided him with dinner during his first night of questioning. The following day, Spano was transferred to another police station where questioning continued. He was again denied assistance of counsel. Bruno, upon police instructions, told Spano that he could get into trouble if Spano did not confess, although Bruno's job was not really in jeopardy. Bruno approached Spano four times before Spano gave a statement; each time questioning had resumed, Spano requested assistance of counsel. Police escorted Spano to the location where they believed he had disposed of the murder weapon. While searching for the weapon, Spano confessed.

The issue was whether police violated Spano's Sixth Amendment right to counsel during interrogation. The Court did not reach the Sixth Amendment question, however, because they held that the use of the confession was inconsistent with the Fourteenth Amendment and fundamental fairness. The Court identified six factors that together constituted police misconduct:

1. Spano was relatively young and inexperienced in the criminal justice system.
2. Spano was subjected to leading questions and did not make a narrative statement to police.
3. He was questioned incessantly and through the night.
4. Police persisted questioning him even though he said his attorney advised him to remain silent.
5. Police ignored his request to contact his attorney.
6. The officers used his close friend, Bruno, to manipulate him.

The Court held that the interrogation violated Spano's 14th Amendment due process rights because Spano's confession was not voluntary.

The two concurring opinions emphasized Spano's right to counsel.

== Effects of the decision ==
Spano opened the door for Miranda v. Arizona. Even though the majority opinion used the traditional voluntariness analysis, the concurring opinions indicated that a person had a constitutional right to counsel, if that counsel had been retained, once the person was formally charged by indictment or information. The majority opinion did not preclude the right-to-counsel argument expressed in the concurring opinions.

== See also ==
- List of United States Supreme Court cases, volume 360
