= Twenty-sixth Amendment to the United States Constitution =

1971 amendment granting suffrage to citizens aged 18

The Twenty-sixth Amendment (Amendment XXVI) to the United States Constitution establishes a nationally standardized highest permissible minimum age of 18 for participation in state and federal elections. It was proposed by Congress on March 23, 1971, and three-fourths of the states ratified it by July 1, 1971, making it the fastest amendment in American history at 100 days.

Various public officials had supported lowering the voting age during the mid-20th century, but were unable to gain the legislative momentum necessary for passing a constitutional amendment.

The drive to lower the voting age from 21 to 18 grew across the country during the 1960s and was driven in part by the military draft held during the Vietnam War. The draft conscripted young men between the ages of 18 and 21 into the United States Armed Forces, primarily the U.S. Army, to serve in or support military combat operations in Vietnam. This means young men could be required to fight and possibly die for their nation in wartime at 18. However, these same citizens could not have a legal say in the government's decision to wage that war until the age of 21. A youth rights movement emerged in response, calling for a similarly reduced voting age. A common slogan of proponents of lowering the voting age stated "Old enough to fight, old enough to vote".

Determined to get around inaction on the issue, congressional allies included a provision for the 18-year-old vote in a 1970 bill that extended the Voting Rights Act. The Supreme Court subsequently held in the case of Oregon v. Mitchell that Congress could not lower the voting age for state and local elections. Recognizing the confusion and costs that would be involved in maintaining separate voting rolls and elections for federal and state contests, Congress quickly proposed and the states ratified the Twenty-sixth Amendment.

== Text ==
Section 1. The right of citizens of the United States, who are eighteen years of age or older, to vote shall not be denied or abridged by the United States or by any State on account of age.

Section 2. The Congress shall have power to enforce this article by appropriate legislation.

== Background ==
The framers of the U.S. Constitution did not establish specific criteria for national citizenship or voting qualifications in state or federal elections. Before the Twenty-sixth Amendment, states had the authority to set their own minimum voting ages, which was typically 21 as the national standard.

An effort to reduce the age limit to 18 nationally began to gain serious traction during World War II. This came about after 18 & 19 year old men started being drafted and some of the public showed concern about this possibility and not being able to vote. The age limit was not reduced nationally during the war due to a variety of factors including a perceived lack of maturity, President Franklin D. Roosevelt not regarding youth suffrage as an important issue, and most members of Congress believed it would interfere in the rights of states with regards to setting their own rules about voting. Senator Harley Kilgore began advocating for a lowered voting age in 1941 in the 77th Congress. On October 17, 1942 the first attempt to lower the voting age nationally occurred when Representative Victor Wickersham of Oklahoma proposed an amendment to do so which applied to just the federal level. A few days later Senator Arthur Vandenberg of Michigan initiated a separate one which was a resolution and went further applying to the federal and state level. Vandenberg had a track record of showing interest in young people with Wickersham having a close relationship with young people in his constituency and in general while Vandenberg had previously introduced constitutional amendments banning child labor for those under 16 years old. Neither proposals from Wickersham or Vandenberg passed through Congress.

Despite the support of fellow senators, representatives, and First Lady Eleanor Roosevelt, Congress failed to pass any national change. However, public interest in lowering the voting age became a topic of interest at the local level. In 1943 and 1955 respectively, the Georgia and Kentucky legislatures approved measures to lower the voting age to 18 and several other localities lowered the voting age in the 1950s including the Hawaii and Alaska Territories along with Guam. President Harry S. Truman did not publicly indicate whether he supported lowering the voting age to 18 years old.

President Dwight D. Eisenhower, in his 1954 State of the Union address, became the first president to publicly support prohibiting age-based denials of suffrage for those 18 and older. During the 1960s, both Congress and the state legislatures came under increasing pressure to lower the minimum voting age from 21 to 18. This was in large part due to the Vietnam War, in which many young men who were ineligible to vote were conscripted to fight in the war, thus lacking any means to influence the people sending them off to risk their lives. "Old enough to fight, old enough to vote" was a common slogan used by proponents of lowering the voting age. The slogan traced its roots to World War II, when President Roosevelt lowered the military draft age to 18.

In 1963, the President's Commission on Registration and Voting Participation, in its report to President Lyndon B. Johnson, encouraged lowering the voting age. Johnson proposed an immediate national grant of the right to vote to 18-year-olds on May 29, 1968. Historian Thomas H. Neale argues that the move to lower the voting age followed a historical pattern similar to other extensions of the franchise; with the escalation of the war in Vietnam, constituents were mobilized and eventually a constitutional amendment passed.

Those advocating for a lower voting age drew on a range of arguments to promote their cause, and scholarship increasingly links the rise of support for a lower voting age to young people's role in the civil rights movement and other movements for social and political change of the 1950s and 1960s. Increasing high-school graduation rates and young people's access to political information through new technologies also influenced more positive views of their preparation for the most important right of citizenship.

Between 1942, when public debates about a lower voting age began in earnest, and the early 1970s, ideas about youth agency increasingly challenged the caretaking model that had previously dominated the nation's approaches to young people's rights. Characteristics traditionally associated with youth—idealism, lack of "vested interests", and openness to new ideas—came to be seen as positive qualities for a political system that seemed to be in crisis.

In 1970, Senator Ted Kennedy proposed amending the Voting Rights Act of 1965 to lower the voting age nationally. On June 22, 1970, President Richard Nixon signed an extension of the Voting Rights Act that required the voting age to be 18 in all federal, state, and local elections. In his statement on signing the extension, Nixon said:

Despite my misgivings about the constitutionality of this one provision, I have signed the bill. I have directed the Attorney General to cooperate fully in expediting a swift court test of the constitutionality of the 18-year-old provision.

Subsequently, Oregon and Texas challenged the law in court, and the case came before the Supreme Court in 1970 as Oregon v. Mitchell. By this time, four states had a minimum voting age below 21: Georgia, Kentucky, Alaska, and Hawaii. (Note: 18 for Georgia and Kentucky, 19 for Alaska and 20 for Hawaii)

=== Oregon v. Mitchell ===
During debate of the 1970 extension of the Voting Rights Act, Senator Ted Kennedy argued that the Equal Protection Clause of the Fourteenth Amendment allowed Congress to pass national legislation lowering the voting age. In Katzenbach v. Morgan (1966), the Supreme Court had ruled that if Congress acted to enforce the 14th Amendment by passing a law declaring that a type of state law discriminates against a certain class of persons, the Supreme Court would let the law stand if the justices could "perceive a basis" for Congress's actions.

President Nixon disagreed with Kennedy in a letter to the Speaker of the House and the House minority and majority leaders, asserting that the issue was not whether the voting age should be lowered, but how. In his own interpretation of Katzenbach, Nixon argued that to include age as a possible parameter of discrimination would overstretch the concept, and voiced concerns that the damage of a Supreme Court decision to overturn the Voting Rights Act could be disastrous.

In Oregon v. Mitchell (1970), the Supreme Court considered whether the voting-age provisions Congress added to the Voting Rights Act in 1970 were constitutional. The Court struck down the provisions that established 18 as the voting age in state and local elections. However, the Court upheld the provision establishing the voting age as 18 in federal elections. The Court was deeply divided in this case, and a majority of justices did not agree on a rationale for the holding.

The decision resulted in states being able to maintain 21 as the voting age in state and local elections, but being required to establish separate voter rolls so that voters between 18 and 21 years old could vote in federal elections.

=== Opposition ===
Although the Twenty-sixth Amendment passed faster than any other constitutional amendment, about 17 states refused to pass measures to lower their minimum voting ages after Nixon signed the 1970 extension to the Voting Rights Act. Opponents to extending the vote to youths questioned the maturity and responsibility of people at the age of 18. Representative Emanuel Celler of New York, one of the most vocal opponents of a lower voting age from the 1940s through 1970 (and Chair of the powerful House Judiciary Committee for much of that period), insisted that youth lacked "the good judgment" essential to good citizenship and that the qualities that made youth good soldiers did not also make them good voters.

William G. Carleton wondered why the vote was proposed for youth at a time when the period of adolescence had grown so substantially rather than in the past when people had more responsibilities at earlier ages. Carleton further criticized the move to lower the voting age, citing American preoccupations with youth in general, exaggerated reliance on higher education, and equating technological savvy with responsibility and intelligence. He denounced the military service argument as well, calling it a "cliche". Considering the ages of soldiers in the Civil War, he asserted that literacy and education were not the grounds for limiting voting; rather, common sense and the capacity to understand the political system grounded voting-age restrictions.

James J. Kilpatrick, a political columnist, asserted that the states were "extorted" into ratifying the Twenty-sixth Amendment. In his article, he claims that, by passing the 1970 extension to the Voting Rights Act, Congress effectively forced the States to ratify the amendment lest they be forced to financially and bureaucratically cope with maintaining two voting registers. George Gallup also mentions the cost of registration in his article showing percentages favoring or opposing the amendment, and he draws particular attention to the lower rates of support among adults aged 30–49 and over 50 (57% and 52% respectively) as opposed to those aged 18–20 and 21–29 (84% and 73% respectively).

== Proposal and ratification ==
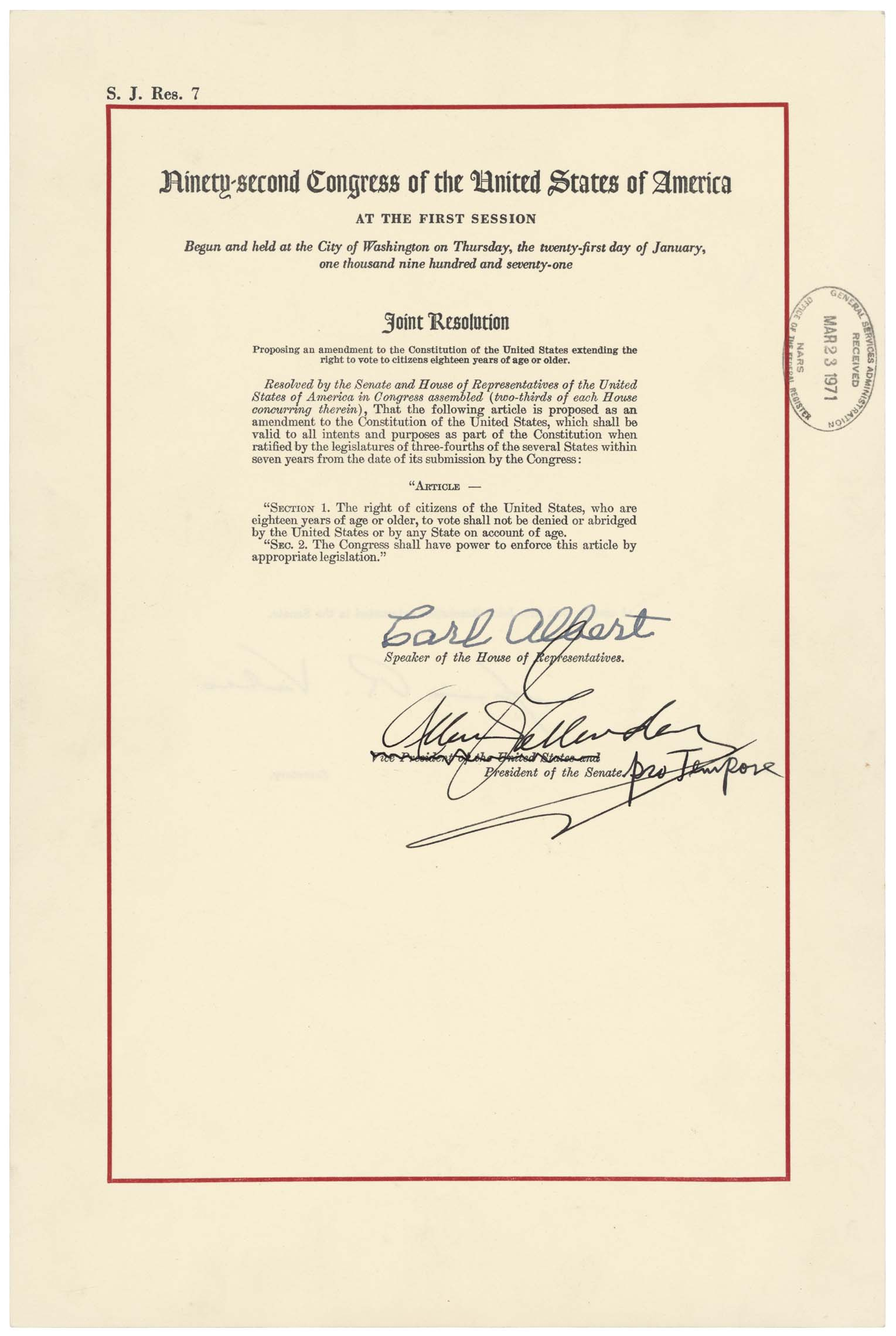
The Twenty-sixth Amendment in the National Archives

=== Passage by Congress ===
Senator Birch Bayh's subcommittee on constitutional amendments began hearings on extending voting rights to 18-year-olds in 1968.

After Oregon v. Mitchell, Bayh surveyed election officials in 47 states and found that registering an estimated 10 million young people in a separate system for federal elections would cost approximately $20 million. Bayh concluded that most states could not change their state constitutions in time for the 1972 election, mandating national action to avoid "chaos and confusion" at the polls.

On March 2, 1971, Bayh's subcommittee and the House Judiciary Committee approved the proposed constitutional amendment to lower the voting age to 18 for all elections.

On March 10, 1971, the Senate voted 94–0 in favor of proposing a constitutional amendment to guarantee the minimum voting age could not be higher than 18. On March 23, 1971, the House of Representatives voted 401–19 in favor of the proposed amendment.

=== Ratification by the states ===
Having been passed by the 92nd United States Congress, the proposed Twenty-sixth Amendment was sent to the state legislatures for their consideration. Which state was the first to officially ratify the amendment was a matter of dispute: the Minnesota legislature approved the amendment on March 23, 1971, at 3:14 p.m. CST (4:14 p.m. EST), minutes before U.S. Senate president pro tempore Allen J. Ellender officially approved the federal law at approximately 4:35 or 4:40 pm. EST. Legislators in Delaware, which ratified the amendment at 4:51 pm, argued that Minnesota's ratification was invalid because the amendment had not yet been sent to the states. The U.S. Senate parliamentarian ruled that Minnesota acted prematurely, but the legality of its ratification of the amendment was never officially challenged.

Ratification was completed on June 30, 1971, after the amendment had been ratified by thirty-eight states. Which state was the 38th to ratify and thus put the amendment into effect has also been disputed. Contemporaneous reports agree that Ohio's House of Representatives cast the decisive vote on the evening of June 30, and that Alabama and North Carolina had ratified the amendment earlier in the day. As of 2013, however, the Government Printing Office states that North Carolina did not complete its ratification of the amendment until July 1, at which time it became the 38th state to ratify. Additionally, Alabama governor George Wallace claimed that his state was the 38th to ratify, because he did not sign the ratification resolution until after North Carolina and Ohio completed their ratifications; however, the approval of the governor is not required to ratify an amendment.

1. Minnesota: March 23, 1971 (4:14 p.m. EST)
2. Delaware: March 23, 1971 (4:51 p.m. EST)
3. Tennessee: March 23, 1971 (5:10 p.m. EST)
4. Washington: March 23, 1971 (5:42 p.m. EST)
5. Connecticut: March 23, 1971 (5:53 p.m. EST)
6. Hawaii: March 24, 1971
7. Massachusetts: March 24, 1971
8. Montana: March 29, 1971
9. Arkansas: March 30, 1971
10. Idaho: March 30, 1971
11. Iowa: March 30, 1971
12. Nebraska: April 2, 1971
13. Kansas: April 7, 1971
14. Michigan: April 7, 1971
15. Alaska: April 8, 1971
16. Maryland: April 8, 1971
17. Indiana: April 8, 1971
18. Maine: April 9, 1971
19. Vermont: April 16, 1971
20. Louisiana: April 17, 1971
21. California: April 19, 1971
22. Colorado: April 27, 1971
23. Pennsylvania: April 27, 1971
24. Texas: April 27, 1971
25. South Carolina: April 28, 1971
26. West Virginia: April 28, 1971
27. New Jersey: May 3, 1971
28. New Hampshire: May 13, 1971
29. Arizona: May 14, 1971
30. Rhode Island: May 27, 1971
31. New York: June 2, 1971
32. Oregon: June 4, 1971
33. Missouri: June 14, 1971
34. Wisconsin: June 22, 1971
35. Illinois: June 29, 1971
36. Alabama: June 30, 1971
37. North Carolina: June 30, 1971
38. Ohio: June 30, 1971

Having been ratified by three-fourths of the States (38), the Twenty-sixth Amendment became part of the Constitution. On July 5, 1971, the Administrator of General Services, Robert Kunzig, certified its adoption. President Nixon and Julianne Jones, Joseph W. Loyd Jr., and Paul S. Larimer of the "Young Americans in Concert" also signed the certificate as witnesses. During the signing ceremony, held in the East Room of the White House, Nixon talked about his confidence in the youth of America:

As I meet with this group today, I sense that we can have confidence that America's new voters, America's young generation, will provide what America needs as we approach our bicentennial, not just strength and not just wealth but the 'Spirit of '76' a spirit of moral courage, a spirit of high idealism in which we believe in the American dream, but in which we realize that the American dream can never be fulfilled until every American has an equal chance to fulfill it in their own life.

The amendment was subsequently ratified by 5 more states, bringing the total number of ratifying states to 43:

39. Oklahoma: July 1, 1971
40. Virginia: July 8, 1971
41. Wyoming: July 8, 1971
42. Georgia: October 4, 1971
43. South Dakota: March 4, 2014

No action has been taken on the amendment by the states of Florida, Kentucky, Mississippi, Nevada, New Mexico, North Dakota, or Utah.

== See also ==
- Fifteenth Amendment to the United States Constitution (1870, extending vote rights to non-white men)
- Nineteenth Amendment to the United States Constitution (1920, extending vote rights to women)
- Representation of the People Act 1969 (legislation in the United Kingdom with equivalent effect)
