= Amendments to the Voting Rights Act of 1965 =

How the Amendments of the 1965 Voting Rights Act expanded through 2006

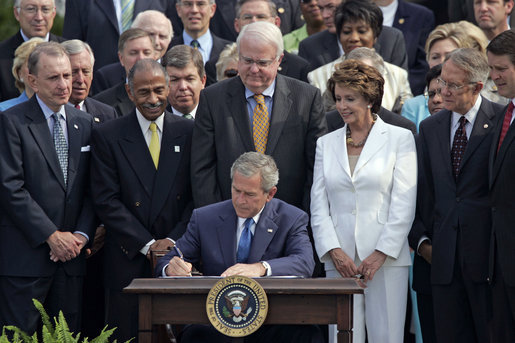
President George W. Bush signs amendments to the Act in July 2006

The U.S. Congress enacted major amendments to the Voting Rights Act of 1965 in 1970, 1975, 1982, 1992, and 2006. Each of these amendments coincided with an impending expiration of some of the Act's special provisions, which originally were set to expire by 1970. However, in recognition of the voting discrimination that continued despite the Act, Congress repeatedly amended the Act to reauthorize the special provisions.

In each of these amendments except for the 1992 amendments, Congress extended the special provisions that were tied to the coverage formula, such as the preclearance requirement. These provisions were extended for five years in 1970, seven years in 1975, and 25 years in both 1982 and 2006. In 1970 and 1975, Congress also expanded the coverage formula, supplementing it with new 1968 and 1972 trigger dates. Coverage was further enlarged in 1975 when Congress expanded the meaning of "tests or devices" to encompass any jurisdiction that provided English-only election information, such as ballots, if the jurisdiction had a single language minority group that constituted more than five percent of the jurisdiction's voting-age citizens. These expansions brought numerous jurisdictions into coverage, including many located outside of the South. To ease the burdens of the reauthorized special provisions, Congress liberalized the bailout procedure in 1982, allowing covered jurisdictions to escape coverage by upholding the voting rights of protected minorities and affirmatively acting to expand minority political participation.

In addition to reauthorizing the special provisions and expanding coverage, Congress amended and added several other provisions to the Act. For instance, Congress expanded the original ban on "tests or devices" to apply nationwide in 1970, and in 1975, Congress made the ban permanent. Separately, in 1975 Congress expanded the Act's scope to protect language minorities from voting discrimination. Congress defined "language minority" to include "persons who are American Indian, Asian American, Alaskan Natives or of Spanish heritage." Congress amended various provisions, such as the Section 5 preclearance requirement and Section 2 general prohibition of discriminatory voting laws, to prohibit discrimination against language minorities.

Congress also enacted a bilingual election requirement in Section 203, which requires election officials in certain jurisdictions with large numbers of English-illiterate language minorities to provide ballots and voting information in the language of the language minority group. Originally set to expire after 10 years, Congress reauthorized Section 203 in 1982 for seven years, expanded and reauthorized it in 1992 for 15 years, and reauthorized it in 2006 for 25 years. The bilingual election requirements have remained controversial, with proponents arguing that bilingual assistance is necessary to enable recently naturalized citizens to vote and opponents arguing that the bilingual election requirements constitute costly unfunded mandates.

Several of the amendments came in response to judicial rulings. In 1982, amended the Section 2 general prohibition of discriminatory voting laws to overturn the Supreme Court case Mobile v. Bolden (1980), which held that Section 2 prohibited only purposeful discrimination. Congress expanded Section 2 to explicitly ban any voting practice that had a discriminatory effect, irrespective of whether the practice was enacted or operated for a discriminatory purpose. The creation of this "results test" shifted the majority of litigation brought under the Voting Rights Act from claims of Section 5 violations to claims of Section 2 violations. In 2006, Congress amended the Act to overturn two Supreme Court cases: Reno v. Bossier Parish School Board (2000), which interpreted Section 5 to prohibit voting changes that were enacted or maintained for a "retrogressive" discriminatory purpose instead of any discriminatory purpose, and Georgia v. Ashcroft (2003), which established a broader test for determining whether a redistricting plan had an impermissible effect under Section 5 than assessing only whether a minority group could elect its preferred candidates.

In response to the Supreme Court case Shelby County v. Holder (2013), which struck down the current coverage formula as unconstitutional, several amendment acts were proposed, all of which failed to make progress.

== 1970 ==
Voting Rights Act, amendments of 1970
- Long title: An Act To extend the Voting Rights Act of 1965 with respect to the discriminatory use of tests, and for other purposes
- Enacted by: the 91st United States Congress
- Effective: June 22, 1970

Citations
- Public law: 91-285
- Statutes at Large: 84 Stat. 314

Codification
- Acts amended: Voting Rights Act of 1965

Legislative history
- Introduced in the House as H.R. 4249 on January 23, 1969; Passed the House on December 11, 1969 (234-179); Passed the Senate on March 13, 1970 (64-12) with amendment; House agreed to Senate amendment on June 17, 1970 (224-183); Signed into law by President Richard M. Nixon on June 22, 1970

Anticipating the expiration of the Act's special provisions in 1970, Congress held extensive hearings on whether the Act should be amended and its special provisions reauthorized. Congress noted discrimination in voting continued in spite of the Act and that the Section 5 preclearance requirement had been minimally enforced since its enactment; between 1965 and 1970, covered jurisdictions had made merely 578 preclearance submissions. Ultimately, Congress determined that although significant progress had been made in reducing racial discrimination in voting since 1965, sufficient discrimination existed to justify extending the special provisions.

President Richard Nixon's administration, which hoped to politically capitalize on the alienation of Southern white voters from the Democratic Party that the Act was causing, sought to reauthorize but weaken the law. Attorney General John N. Mitchell proposed a 3-year extension with amendments to extend the ban on "tests or devices" nationwide and abolish both the coverage formula and the preclearance requirement. Opposed by liberals and supported by Southern Democrats and Midwestern Republicans, this proposal initially passed in the House of Representatives, but it was rejected by the Senate, which crafted its own compromise bill.

Through this legislation, Congress extended the special provisions for five years. Congress also expanded the coverage formula by supplementing it with 1968 trigger dates, bringing into coverage several new jurisdictions outside of the South and appeasing several Southern legislators who felt the original coverage formula unfairly singled out Southern states. Simultaneously, Congress amended the bailout provision to require covered jurisdictions seeking bailout to prove that they had not used a test or device in a discriminatory manner in the ten-year period preceding their bailout request, an increase from the original five-year period requirement. Congress also expanded the ban on using tests or devices to the entire nation.

Congress also added new provisions to the Act. Two new provisions exclusively regulated presidential elections: one created uniform rules for voter registration and absentee voting, and the other prohibited states from applying their own durational residency requirements as voting qualifications. Influenced by the draft of males at least 18 years of age to fight in the Vietnam War, Senator Ted Kennedy convinced Congress to add a provision guaranteeing citizens at least 18 years of age the right to vote in federal, state, and local elections. In a statement explaining his decision to sign the amendments, Nixon expressed doubts that this provision was constitutional, and he instructed the Attorney General to expedite litigation to test its constitutionality.

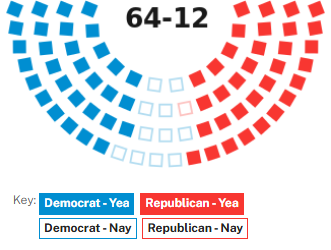
The vote breakdown in the US Senate by party of The Voting Rights Act of 1970.

Later that year, the Supreme Court, in Oregon v. Mitchell (1970), struck down the part of the provision lowering the voting age in state elections as unconstitutional; the Court upheld only the part of the provision that lowered the voting age in federal elections. The decision precipitated the ratification of the Twenty-sixth Amendment the following year, which lowered the voting age in all elections to 18.

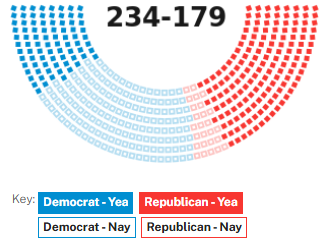
The vote breakdown in the US House by party of The Voting Rights Act of 1970.

=== Legislative breakdown ===
The Senate passed its version by a 64–12 vote, and the House then passed it by a bipartisan 237–132 vote. The legislation was enacted on June 17, 1970, as the Voting Rights Act Amendments of 1970. President Nixon signed it into law on June 22.

On December 11, 1969, the US House of Representatives passed the Voting Rights Act of 1970. Republicans voted in 152 in favor, 26 opposed, and 11 not voting. Democrats voted 82 in favor, 153 opposed, and 9 not voting. On March 13, 1970, the US Senate placed the bill on the floor for a vote, where it passed. Republicans voted 33 in favor, 1 opposed, and 9 not voting. Democrats voted 31 in favor, 11 opposed, and 15 not voting.

== 1975 ==
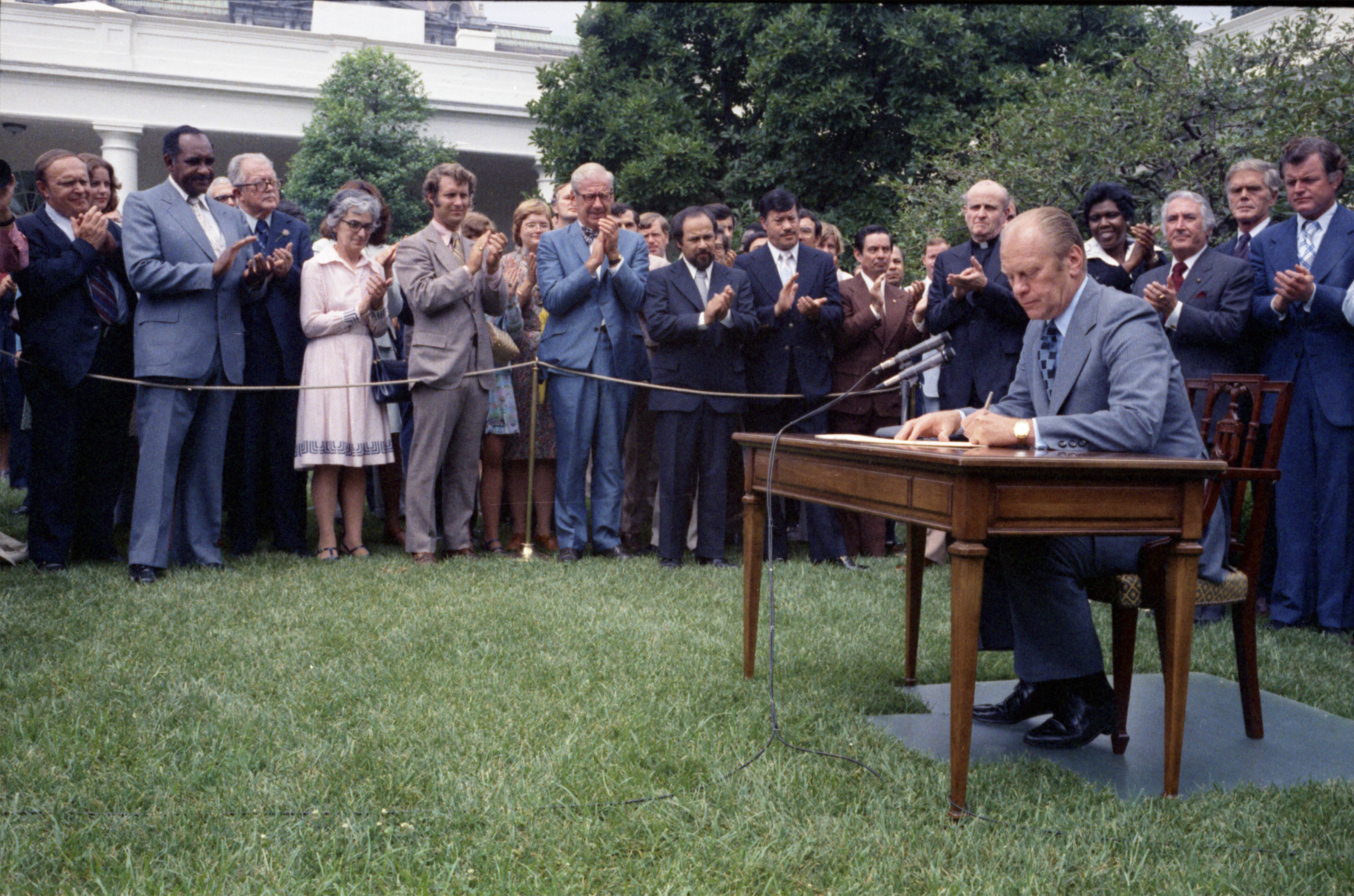
United States President Gerald Ford signs H.R. 6219, Extending the Voting Rights Act of 1965, August 1975.

Voting Rights Act, amendments of 1975
- Long title: An Act to amend the Voting Rights Act of 1965 to extend certain provisions for an additional seven years, to make permanent the ban against certain prerequisites to voting, and for other purposes
- Enacted by: the 94th United States Congress
- Effective: August 6, 1975

Citations
- Public law: 94-73
- Statutes at Large: 89 Stat. 400

Codification
- Acts amended: Voting Rights Act of 1965

Legislative history
- Introduced in the House as H.R. 6219 by Don Edwards (D–CA) on April 22, 1975; Passed the House on June 4, 1975 (341-70); Passed the Senate on July 24, 1975 (77-12) with amendment; House agreed to Senate amendment on July 28, 1975 (345-56); Signed into law by President Gerald Ford on August 6, 1975

Congress revisited the Act in 1975, the year that the Act's special provisions were again set to expire. The debate was less acrimonious than previous debates concerning the Act, reflecting an expanded consensus in Congress that the law remained necessary to remedy continued racial discrimination in voting. Unlike Nixon, President Gerald Ford's administration, which worked to improve relations with African Americans after Nixon's presidency, supported extending the Act without weakening it. After conducting several hearings, Congress passed legislation amending the Act; the Senate approved the amendments by a 77–12 vote, and the House of Representatives by a 346–56 vote. President Ford signed the amendments into law on August 6, 1975.

The amendments extended the Act's special provisions for seven years. Congress chose seven years to avoid having to reconsider the special provisions during the 1980s reapportionment process. Relatedly, Congress amended the bailout provision to require covered jurisdictions seeking bailout to prove that they had not used a test or device in a discriminatory manner in the 17-year period preceding their bailout request. Congress also expanded the coverage formula by adding new dates in 1972 as triggering dates, which brought more jurisdictions into coverage. Furthermore, Congress made permanent the nationwide prohibition on tests or devices.

The 1975 amendments also expanded voting rights for minority groups that traditionally had fallen outside the Act's protections. Civil rights organizations representing Hispanic, Asian American, Native Alaskan, and Native American interests argued before Congress that such groups often were the victims of discriminatory voting practices, particularly in areas where English was not the dominant language. After Congress heard testimony of language discrimination in voting, Congresswoman Barbara Jordan (D-TX) successfully led an effort to amend the Act to protect language minorities. Specifically, Congress amended the definition of "test or device" to prohibit laws requiring ballots and voting information be provided exclusively in English in jurisdictions where a single-language minority group comprised more than 5% of the voting-age population. This in turn expanded the coverage formula to reach states such as Texas that Congress wanted to cover. Congress also enacted bilingual election requirements, which require election officials in certain jurisdictions to provide ballots and voting information in the language of language minority groups.

== 1982 ==
Voting Rights Act Amendments of 1982
- Long title: An Act to amend the Voting Rights Act of 1965 to extend the effect of certain provisions, and for other purposes.
- Enacted by: the 97th United States Congress

Citations
- Public law: 97-205
- Statutes at Large: 96 Stat. 131

Legislative history
- Introduced in the House as H.R. 3112 by Peter W. Rodino on April 7, 1981; Signed into law by President Ronald Reagan on June 29, 1982; 44 years ago

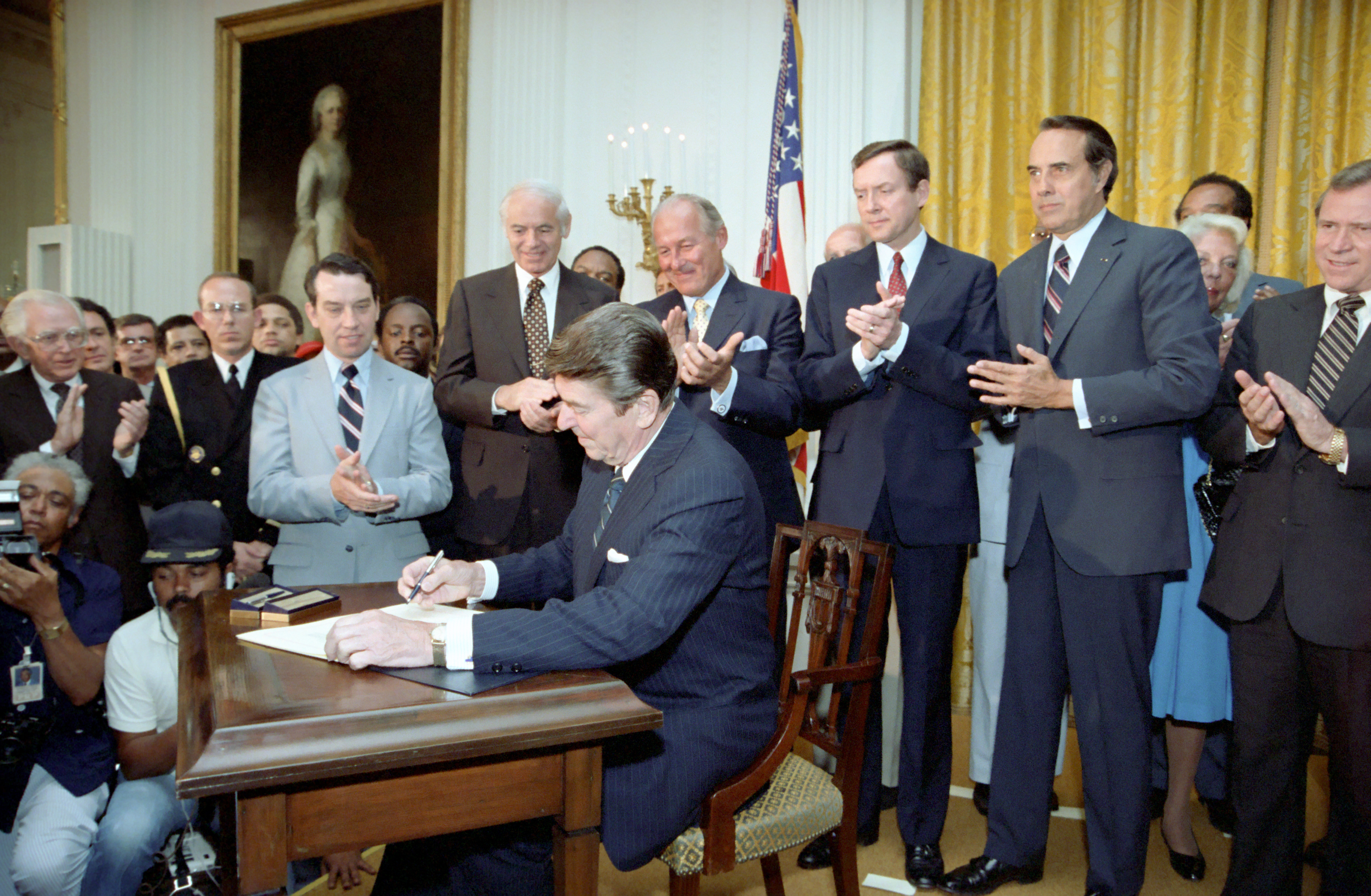
United States President Ronald Reagan signs amendments to the Act in June 1982.

As the special provisions neared expiration again, Congress reconsidered the Act in 1982. Organizations in The Leadership Conference on Civil Rights, such as the National Association for the Advancement of Colored People (NAACP) and the National Education Association (NEA), organized to pressure Congress both to extend the special provisions and to expand the Act's general prohibition on discriminatory voting laws. Congressional opponents of the amendments had little support for their positions outside of Congress.

The House of Representatives, which was the first chamber to consider amendments, conducted seven weeks of hearings on amendatory legislation at which over 100 witnesses testified, most of whom supported extending the Act's special provisions by at least 10 years. President Ronald Reagan's administration largely stayed out of the debate as the legislation worked its way through the House. However, President Reagan did indicate he supported replacing the coverage formula with a nationwide preclearance requirement. This caused a major controversy against the Reagan administration because it occurred at around the same time the administration was seeking to block the Internal Revenue Service from denying tax-exempt status to segregated private schools, which soon forced the Reagan administration to backtrack some of its opposition. The House ultimately passed legislation maintaining the coverage formula and permanently extending the special provisions. Supporters of the House bill hoped to sustain the momentum from the House and expedite approval of the House bill in the Senate, but Senators opposing the legislation slowed its passage through extensive committee hearings. Furthermore, the Reagan Administration announced its support for only a 10-year extension of the special provisions. The Senate eventually compromised on maintaining the coverage formula unchanged and extending the special provisions by 25 years, except for the Section 203(c) bilingual election requirement, which was extended for seven years. The Senate also agreed to liberalize the bailout procedure to allow a covered state or local government to escape coverage by proving to the U.S. District Court for D.C. that it had complied with the Voting Rights Act and undertook constructive efforts to expand opportunities for political participation in the 10 years preceding its bailout request. The bailout procedure was also amended to allow a local government to bail out of coverage even if its parent state was covered.

The provision Congress most intensely focused on amending was Section 2, which prescribes a general prohibition of discriminatory voting laws. Two years earlier, the Supreme Court, in Mobile v. Bolden (1980), held that racially discriminatory laws violated the Fourteenth or Fifteenth Amendments only if the laws were enacted or maintained for a discriminatory purpose; thus, showing that a law simply had a discriminatory effect was insufficient to state a constitutional claim of discrimination. The Court further held that Section 2 mirrored this constitutional standard. The decision had a major effect on voting rights litigation; civil rights lawyers decided not to pursue many planned cases, and courts overturned several judgments that were previously entered in favor of plaintiffs. This prompted nationwide outrage that weighed heavily on Congress as it considered amending the Act in 1982.

During the nine days of Senate hearings concerning whether to amend the Act, Section 2 was the primary focus—in particular, whether to amend Section 2 to create a "results" test that prohibited any voting law that had a discriminatory effect, irrespective of whether the law was enacted or operated for a discriminatory purpose. President Reagan opposed creating a results test because its impact would be uncertain. Furthermore, some members of Congress, such as Senator Orrin Hatch (R-UT), raised concerns that a results test would fundamentally alter American democracy by requiring courts to impose proportional representation for protected minority groups as a remedy. To assuage this concern, Senator Robert Dole (R-KS) proposed legislative language explicitly disclaiming that a results test would require proportional representation. This compromise won support from the Senate, the House, and the Reagan Administration. The House passed this version of the bill by a 389–24 vote, and the Senate passed it by an 85–8 vote. President Reagan signed the legislation into law on June 29, 1982. The creation of the Section 2 results test shifted the majority of litigation brought under the Voting Rights Act from claims of Section 5 violations to claims of Section 2 violations.

In 2026, Republican appointed Justices Samuel Alito, Clarence Thomas, John Roberts, Neil Gorsuch, Brett Kavanaugh, and Amy Coney Barrett in Louisiana v. Callais reinstated Mobile v. Bolden against the amendment.

== 1992 ==
Voting Rights Language Assistance Act of 1992
- Long title: An Act to amend the Voting Rights Act of 1965 with respect to bilingual election requirements
- Enacted by: the 102nd United States Congress

Citations
- Public law: 102-344
- Statutes at Large: 106 Stat. 921

Legislative history
- Introduced in the House as H.R. 4312 by José E. Serrano on February 25, 1992; Passed the House on July 24, 1992 (237-125); Passed the Senate on August 7, 1992 (75-20); Signed into law by President George H. W. Bush on August 26, 1992; 34 years ago

As the bilingual election requirement in Section 203(c) neared expiration in 1992, Congress considered legislation to extend and expand it. Representative José E. Serrano (D-NY) introduced legislation, dubbed the Voting Rights Language Assistance Act of 1992, to extend the provision for 15 years, making its term coterminous with the other special provisions scheduled to expire in 2007. The legislation also expanded the coverage formula and the Section 203(c) bilingual election requirement to cover jurisdictions containing at least 10,000 persons of any one of the covered language minorities. This reached major cities such as Philadelphia, San Francisco, and Los Angeles. Finally, in recognition of "the historical fact that reservation boundaries predate and therefore often do not correspond to State or county lines," the legislation created an alternative coverage formula for Native American language-minority voters living on Indian reservations.

This legislation received more Congressional opposition than the 1982 amendments did, most of it from Republicans. Proponents argued that the lack of bilingual assistance hindered recently naturalized citizens from exercising their voting rights and that the country had a history of acceptance toward linguistic pluralism. Opponents argued that the Voting Rights Act was never meant to protect language minorities and that the bilingual assistance provision was a costly unfunded mandate. Opponents proposed several amendments to weaken the legislation, including limiting the extension to 5 years, requiring the federal government to pay for the bilingual voting materials, and completely removing the bilingual provisions. These amendments failed, and Congress passed the legislation with mostly Democratic support; the House passed it by a 237–125 vote, and the Senate passed it by a 75–20 vote. President George H. W. Bush signed the legislation on August 26, 1992.

== 2006 ==
Fannie Lou Hamer, Rosa Parks, and Coretta Scott King Voting Rights Act Reauthorization and Amendments Act of 2006
- Long title: An Act to amend the Voting Rights Act of 1965.
- Enacted by: the 109th United States Congress

Citations
- Public law: 109-246
- Statutes at Large: 120 Stat. 577

Legislative history
- Introduced in the 109th as H.R. 9 by Jim Sensenbrenner on May 2, 2006; Passed the House on July 13, 2006 (390-33); Passed the Senate on July 20, 2006 (98-0); Signed into law by President George W. Bush on July 27, 2006; 20 years ago

Congress reconsidered the Act in 2006 as the special provisions were due to expire in 2007. Civil rights organizations advocated for the renewal and strengthening of the special provisions. As a matter of principle, Democrats generally supported renewing the special provisions. However, the Republican Party controlled both chambers of Congress and the presidency, and many Republicans considered the preclearance requirement an affront to states' rights and the principle of color-blindness. Furthermore, conservatives believed that the primary beneficiaries of the special provisions were African Americans, who overwhelmingly and increasingly voted for Democratic Party candidates. However, Republicans were receiving increasing support from some language minority groups, particularly Hispanics and Asian Americans, and they did not wish to risk losing that support by refusing to reauthorize the special provisions. Republicans also recognized that the Act often helped Republican candidates win by requiring jurisdictions to pack Democratic-leaning racial minorities into few electoral districts. In addition, House Judiciary Committee Chair Jim Sensenbrenner (R-WI) had a strong desire to reauthorize the special provisions, and he led an early effort to pass a reauthorization bill before his chairmanship expired at the end of 2006. Thus, a consensus in favor of reauthorizing the special provisions emerged early in the legislative process.

In 2005, the House Judiciary Subcommittee on the Constitution began holding hearings on amending the Voting Rights Act. Few witnesses at the hearings testified against reauthorizing the special provisions, and the committee focused primarily on assembling evidence of discrimination in voting. Congress's evidentiary record of voting discrimination was viewed as particularly important because Congress believed that according to the Supreme Court case Boerne v. Flores (1997) and its progeny, Congress needed to demonstrate that legislation passed to enforce the Reconstruction Amendments was "congruent and proportional" to remedying or preventing constitutional violations. To make this showing, the committee needed to assemble evidence to demonstrate that the special provisions were generally successful in combating racial discrimination in voting, but not so successful as to no longer be necessary. Given the uncertainty surrounding the congruence and proportionality standard, political constraints, and the Supreme Court previously having upheld the special provisions as constitutional, the committee decided to reauthorize the special provisions without amending the coverage formula. The committee ultimately included in the record four types of evidence to support this reauthorization: statistics showing rates of minority voter registration, turnout, and elective officeholding in covered versus non-covered jurisdictions; statistics showing the behavior of covered jurisdictions and the Department of Justice in the preclearance process; instances of voting discrimination in covered jurisdictions; and data comparing successful Section 2 litigation in covered versus non-covered jurisdictions.

On May 2, 2006, Representative Sensenbrenner introduced the Fannie Lou Hamer, Rosa Parks, and Coretta Scott King Voting Rights Act Reauthorization and Amendments Act of 2006. The bill proposed to extend the special provisions by 25 years and keep the coverage formula unchanged. The bill also proposed to amend the Act to overturn two recent Supreme Court cases: Reno v. Bossier Parish School Board (2000), which interpreted Section 5 to prohibit only those voting changes that were enacted or maintained for a "retrogressive" purpose instead of any discriminatory purpose, (Note: The decision of in Bossier was based on the court's earlier decision in Beer v. United States (1976), which held that changes to electoral schemes in covered districts were only illegal under Section 5 if they resulted in "retrogressive" discriminatory effects (that is, only where such effects left a minority group in a worse position than had existed before). In spite previous Supreme Court decisions which had "seemed to make clear that any discriminatory purposes — not just retrogressive ones — violated Section 5", Bossier applied this standard of "retrogression" to the intent of a proposed electoral scheme as well. "As the New York Times reported, the DOJ was henceforth required to 'approve districting changes, even those adopted with a discriminatory purpose, as long as the changes left minority voters in no worse a position than before.'") and Georgia v. Ashcroft (2003), which established a broader test for determining whether a redistricting plan had an impermissible effect under Section 5 than assessing only whether a minority group could elect its preferred candidates. While passage of the bill was virtually certain, a few Republican lawmakers attempted to amend the bill on the House floor. One group of legislators, led by Congressman Lynn Westmoreland (R–GA), argued that the reauthorization unfairly targeted certain jurisdictions for long-past discrimination. Another group of 80 legislators signed a letter originated by Congressman Steve King (R–IA) arguing that the Act's bilingual election requirements constituted costly unfunded mandates. All proposed amendments to the bill failed, though three received the support of a majority of the Republican caucus. Following the defeat of these amendments, the House passed the bill on July 13, 2006, by a 390–33 vote. Notably, this tally included "a substantial fraction" of Republicans who had previously voted in favor of the failed amendments.

Shortly thereafter, the Senate unanimously passed the bill without amendment on July 20, 2006, by a 98–0 vote. However, in an unprecedented event for a bill that passed unanimously out of committee, Senators of only one political party, Republicans, signed onto the bill's Senate committee report, and the report was not filed until six days after the bill's passage. The Senate report differed in significant ways from the House report, and in their own statement, Senate Democrats objected to parts of the Senate report that they believed highlighted evidence that could jeopardize the bill's constitutionality. The day after the committee report was filed, President George W. Bush signed the bill in a morning ceremony on the South Lawn of the White House on July 27, 2006, one year in advance of the 2007 expiration date. The audience at the signing ceremony included family members of Martin Luther King Jr. and Rosa Parks, the reverends Al Sharpton and Jesse Jackson, NAACP Chairman Julian Bond, and other civil rights leaders.

== Proposed ==
Many proposals to amend the Voting Rights Act of 1965 have been unsuccessful or remain pending in Congress. In 2013 the Supreme Court, in Shelby County v. Holder, invalidated the Voting Rights Act's coverage formula; several bills have been proposed to create a new coverage formula. In 2014, the Voting Rights Amendments Act was introduced in Congress to create a new coverage formula and amend various other provisions. It was referred to the Constitution and Civil Justice congressional subcommittee on February 11, 2015, but no action was taken on it, and it expired in 2017. Again in 2019, Reps. Jim Sensenbrenner (R-Wisconsin) and John Conyers Jr. (D-Michigan) introduced bipartisan legislation to update the Voting Rights Act. The bill's proposed coverage formula would cover 13 states with a history of voter discrimination: Alabama, Georgia, Mississippi, Texas, Louisiana, Florida, South Carolina, North Carolina, Arkansas, Arizona, California, New York, and Virginia. On December 6, 2019, the House of Representatives voted 228–187 in favor of the bill. Pennsylvania Congressman Brian Fitzpatrick was the lone Republican to support it. Should it have been passed by the Senate, President Donald Trump threatened to veto it.

The For the People Act was reintroduced, again as H.R. 1 in the 117th Congress, and was passed by the House of Representatives on March 3, 2021, by a narrow, near-party line vote of 220–210, with all Republicans voting against and all but one Democrat voting for. At the time, the For the People Act was awaiting a vote in the Senate, which was divided 50-50 between Democrats and Republicans, with Vice President Kamala Harris holding the tie-breaking vote, though Republican use of the Senate filibuster had threatened to prevent the legislation from coming to a vote. On June 22, 2021, the Senate held a cloture vote on the For the People Act, which required a 3/5+ (60 votes) supermajority to proceed, which failed in a 50–50 vote.

The John Lewis Voting Rights Act, which would create a new coverage formula for Section 5 of the Voting Rights Act of 1965 to replace the formula struck down by the Shelby County decision, currently awaits a vote in the House of Representatives, where it is similarly expected to pass with Democrats largely in support and Republicans largely opposed.
