= Oregon v. Mitchell =

- Supreme Court of the United States

Argued October 20, 1970 Decided December 21, 1970
- Full case name: Oregon v. Mitchell, Attorney General
- Citations: 400 U.S. 112 (more) 91 S. Ct. 260; 27 L. Ed. 2d 272; 1970 U.S. LEXIS 1

Holding
- 1. Lowering the voting age to 18 years in federal elections under Section 302 of the Voting Rights Act (VRA) Amendments of 1970 is constitutional under Section 5 of the 14th Amendment to enforce the Equal Protection Clause; 2. Lowering the voting age to 18 years under Section 302 of the 1970 VRA Amendments in state and local elections is unconstitutional under the 10th Amendment; 3. Section 201 of the 1970 VRA Amendments banning the use of literacy tests as a voter qualification in federal, state, and local elections is constitutional under Section 2 of the 15th Amendment; 4. Section 202 of the 1970 VRA Amendments creating a minimum residency duration requirement for voter registration and a uniform rule for absentee voting in presidential elections is constitutional under Section 5 of the 14th Amendment to enforce the Privileges or Immunities Clause.

Court membership
- Chief Justice Warren E. Burger Associate Justices Hugo Black · William O. Douglas; John M. Harlan II · William J. Brennan Jr. Potter Stewart · Byron White; Thurgood Marshall · Harry Blackmun

Case opinions
- Plurality: Part 1: Brennan, White, and Marshall; Part 2: Stewart, Burger, and Blackmun; Part 3: Brennan, White, and Marshall; Stewart, Burger, and Blackmun; Part 4: Brennan, White, and Marshall
- Concurrence: Part 1: Douglas; Black (in judgment); Part 2: Black; Harlan; Part 3: Harlan; Douglas (in judgment); Black (in judgment); Part 4: Douglas; Stewart, Burger, and Blackmun (in judgment); Black (in judgment)
- Dissent: Part 1: Stewart, Burger, and Blackmun; Harlan; Part 2: Brennan, White, and Marshall; Douglas; Part 4: Harlan

Laws applied
- 10th Amendment, Enforcement Clauses of the 14th and 15th Amendments
- Superseded by
- 26th Amendment (Parts 1 and 2)

Oregon v. Mitchell, 400 U.S. 112 (1970), was a U.S. Supreme Court case in which the states of Oregon, Texas, Arizona, and Idaho challenged the constitutionality of Sections 201, 202, and 302 of the Voting Rights Act (VRA) Amendments of 1970 passed by the 91st United States Congress, and where John Mitchell was the respondent in his role as United States Attorney General. The Supreme Court ruled that the literacy test ban under Section 201, the minimum residency duration requirement for voter registration and the uniform rule for absentee voting in presidential elections under Section 202, and that Congress lowering the voting age in federal elections from 21 to 18 under Section 302 were all constitutional, but that Congress lowering the voting age in state and local elections from 21 to 18 under Section 302 was unconstitutional.

== Holdings ==
=== Section 201 ===
Despite the Court upholding Section 201 unanimously, Potter Stewart, Warren Burger, and Harry Blackmun in a single opinion, William J. Brennan, Byron White, and Thurgood Marshall in a separate single opinion, and John Marshall Harlan II in a separate opinion argued the literacy test ban was constitutional under Section 2 of the 15th Amendment. In separate opinions, William O. Douglas argued that it was constitutional under Section 5 of the 14th Amendment to enforce the Equal Protection Clause, while Hugo Black argued that it was constitutional under both Section 2 of the 15th Amendment and Section 5 of the 14th Amendment to enforce the Equal Protection Clause.

=== Section 202 ===
The Court upheld Section 202 by an 8–1 ruling with Douglas and Brennan, White, and Marshall arguing the minimum residency duration requirement for voter registration and the uniform rule for absentee voting in presidential elections was constitutional under Section 5 of the 14th Amendment to enforce the Privileges or Immunities Clause. Stewart, Burger, and Blackmun also argued Section 202 was constitutional under Section 5 of the 14th Amendment to enforce the Privileges or Immunities Clause but more broadly under the Necessary and Proper Clause of Article I, Section VIII to protect constitutional provisions related to freedom of movement in general and under the Privileges and Immunities Clause of Article IV, Section II specifically. Black argued Section 202 was constitutional under the Congressional Elections Clause of Article I, Section IV and the Necessary and Proper Clause. Harlan dissented and argued Section 202 was unconstitutional under the 10th Amendment by the delegation of powers under the Presidential Electors Clause and the Electoral College Meetings Clause of Article II, Section I.

=== Section 302 ===
The Court upheld Section 302 lowering the voting age in federal elections by a 5–4 ruling with Douglas and Brennan, White, and Marshall arguing it was constitutional under Section 5 of the 14th Amendment to enforce the Equal Protection Clause, and Black arguing it was constitutional under the Congressional Elections Clause and the Necessary and Proper Clause. Harlan and Stewart, Burger, and Blackmun dissented and argued that Section 302 as applied to federal elections was unconstitutional under the 10th Amendment by the delegation of powers under the House Electors Qualifications Clause of Article I, Section II, the Congressional Elections Clause, the 17th Amendment, and the Presidential Electors Clause and the Electoral College Meetings Clause of Article II, Section I. In a separate 5–4 ruling where Black joined Harlan and Stewart, Burger, and Blackmun to form the majority, the Court held that Section 302 lowering the voting age in state and local elections was unconstitutional under the 10th Amendment by the delegation of powers under the House Electors Qualifications Clause and the 17th Amendment, while Douglas and Brennan, White, and Marshall argued it was also constitutional under Section 5 of the 14th Amendment to enforce the Equal Protection Clause.

== 26th Amendment ==
Less than seven months after Oregon v. Mitchell was decided, the Court's Section 302 holdings with respect to minimum age requirements as voter qualifications were superseded by the ratification of the 26th Amendment.

== Subsequent cases ==
In Arizona v. Inter Tribal Council of Arizona, Inc. (2013), the Court concluded that the Section 302 holding that permitted Congress to preempt state voter qualifications for minimum voting age in federal elections under the Equal Protection Clause was of minimal precedential value to that decision.

== See also ==
- List of United States Supreme Court cases, volume 400
- United States v. Butler, 297 U.S. 1 (1936)
- Carter v. Carter Coal Co., 298 U.S. 238 (1936)
- Marks v. United States, 430 U.S. 188 (1977)
