= Barr v. Matteo =

- Supreme Court of the United States

Argued April 20, 1959 Decided June 29, 1959
- Full case name: William G. Barr v. Linda Matteo
- Citations: 360 U.S. 564 (more) 79 S. Ct. 1335, 3 L.Ed.2d 1434

Case history
- Prior: Barr v. Matteo, 244 F.2d 767 (D.C. Cir. 1957)

Holding
- Petitioner's plea of absolute privilege in defense of the alleged libel must be sustained.

Court membership
- Chief Justice Earl Warren Associate Justices Hugo Black · Felix Frankfurter; William O. Douglas · Tom C. Clark; John M. Harlan II · William J. Brennan Jr. Charles E. Whittaker · Potter Stewart

Case opinions
- Plurality: Harlan, joined by Frankfurter, Clark, Whittaker
- Concurrence: Black
- Dissent: Warren, joined by Douglas
- Dissent: Brennan
- Dissent: Stewart

Barr v. Matteo, 360 U.S. 564 (1959), was a United States Supreme Court case concerning legal immunity for officers of the executive branch. The Court held that when a federal government official issues a press release or other public statement about an aspect of their official duties, they are absolutely immune from libel suits—at least so long as the libel suit was not authorized by Congress, per Justice Hugo Black, whose concurring opinion provided the decisive fifth vote for immunity. The case originated when John J. Madigan and Linda Matteo, two former employees of the Office of Rent Stabilization, sued acting director William G. Barr over statements he made about them in a press release. In the Supreme Court's plurality opinion for four of five justices in the majority, Justice John Marshall Harlan II said that Barr was immune from being sued over the contents of his press release because his issuance of that press release was within the "outer perimeter" of his official duties. Harlan's opinion further asserted that federal officials "should be free to exercise their duties unembarrassed by the fear of damage suits in respect of acts done in the course of those duties."

The Barr v. Matteo case had an influence on discussions in later cases involving legal immunity. In the case of Scheuer v. Rhodes, the Supreme Court held state executives to qualified immunity. In Joanne Witty’s analysis for the Columbia Law Review, she says that absolute immunity causes inconsistency when compared to qualified immunity with state officials. In her analysis, she proposes that immunity should be determined by the nature of the official’s offense rather than their rank, whether state or federal. She writes that this approach would ensure that immunity is as broad as necessary to prevent unwarranted interference with the government.
