= Lassiter v. Northampton County Board of Elections =

- Supreme Court of the United States

Argued May 18 – May 19, 1959 Decided June 8, 1959
- Full case name: Lassiter v. Northampton County Board of Elections
- Citations: 360 U.S. 45 (more) 79 S. Ct. 985; 3 L. Ed. 2d 1072

Case history
- Prior: Appeal from the Supreme Court of North Carolina
- Subsequent: Voting Rights Act of 1965 prohibited use of literacy tests

Holding
- A State may use a literacy test as a qualification for voters provided it is applied equally to all and is not intended to discriminate; it is part of its broad powers to determine the conditions under which the right of suffrage may be exercised.

Court membership
- Chief Justice Earl Warren Associate Justices Hugo Black · Felix Frankfurter; William O. Douglas · Tom C. Clark; John M. Harlan II · William J. Brennan Jr. Charles E. Whittaker · Potter Stewart

Case opinion
- Majority: Douglas, joined by unanimous
- Superseded by
- Voting Rights Act of 1965

Lassiter v. Northampton County Board of Elections, 360 U.S. 45 (1959), was a case challenging the constitutionality of the rule of Northampton County, North Carolina requiring potential voters to pass a literacy test to vote, appealed from the Supreme Court of that state.

== Opinion ==
The opinion of the court, delivered by Justice William O. Douglas, held that provided the tests were applied equally to all races, were not "merely a device to make racial discrimination easy," and did not "contravene any restriction that Congress, acting pursuant to its constitutional powers, has imposed," the literacy test could be an allowable use of the state's power to "determine the conditions under which the right of suffrage may be exercised."

In practice, such tests were administered by white voting officials in a discriminatory manner to disfranchise minorities. Given the results from states' using such devices for decades, Congress subsequently prohibited the use of such tests under the Voting Rights Act of 1965, drafted to protect citizens' constitutional rights to vote and provide federal oversight.

== See also ==
- Civil Rights Movement
- Disenfranchisement after the Reconstruction Era
- Voting Rights Act of 1965
