= United States v. Jorn =

- Supreme Court of the United States

Argued January 12, 1970 Reargued October 22, 1970 Decided January 25, 1971
- Full case name: United States v. Jorn
- Docket no.: 19
- Citations: 400 U.S. 470 (more) 91 S. Ct. 547; 27 L. Ed. 2d 543
- Opinion announcement: Opinion announcement

Holding
- The trial judge here abused his discretion, and accordingly appellee's reprosecution would violate the Double Jeopardy Clause.

Court membership
- Chief Justice Warren E. Burger Associate Justices Hugo Black · William O. Douglas; John M. Harlan II · William J. Brennan Jr. Potter Stewart · Byron White; Thurgood Marshall · Harry Blackmun

Case opinions
- Plurality: Harlan, joined by Burger, Douglas, Marshall
- Concurrence: Burger
- Concurrence: Black and Brennan
- Dissent: Stewart, joined by White, Blackmun

Laws applied
- Double Jeopardy Clause of the U.S. Const. Amend. V

United States v. Jorn, 400 U.S. 470 (1971), was a United States Supreme Court decision clarifying when a criminal defendant may be retried after a mistrial. In this case, where a trial judge abruptly declared a mistrial to prevent the prosecution's witness from incriminating himself, a second trial was barred by the Double Jeopardy Clause.

Jorn was charged with numerous counts of assisting in the preparation of fraudulent income tax returns. He was tried in the United States District Court for the District of Utah. Among the government's witnesses were five taxpayers whom Jorn had allegedly assisted in preparing fraudulent returns. As the first of these witnesses was called, the trial judge became concerned the witness was about to incriminate himself, and refused to allow the witness to testify until the same had consulted an attorney. Upon learning that all five witnesses were in the same situation, the judge discharged the jury and aborted the trial. The case was then set for retrial before a different jury, but Jorn argued that retrial was forbidden by double jeopardy.

The question of when a retrial is permitted after a mistrial is flexible and depends on the circumstances of the case. Here, the trial judge had acted sua sponte, abruptly discharging the jury without input from either the prosecution or defense. The Court used the framework of United States v. Perez to evaluate this action, asking whether there was "manifest necessity" to declare the mistrial. Here, the Court concluded, "the trial judge here abused his discretion in discharging the jury," suggesting instead the possibility of a continuance. Justice Harlan pointed out the potential injustice of subjecting the defendant to a second trial, writing, "Reprosecution after a mistrial has unnecessarily been declared ... subjects the defendant to ... personal strain and insecurity."

In conclusion, since there was not "manifest necessity" for the trial judge to declare the mistrial, Jorn could not be reprosecuted.

== See also ==
- List of United States Supreme Court cases
- List of United States Supreme Court cases, volume 400
