= Katzenbach v. Morgan =

- Supreme Court of the United States

Argued April 18, 1966 Decided June 13, 1966
- Full case name: Nicholas Katzenbach, Attorney General, et al. v. Morgan et ux.
- Citations: 384 U.S. 641 (more) 86 S. Ct. 1717; 16 L. Ed. 2d 828; 1966 U.S. LEXIS 1337

Case history
- Prior: Judgment for plaintiffs, Morgan v. Katzenbach, 247 F. Supp. 196 (D.D.C. 1966)

Holding
- Congress may enact laws stemming from its Fourteenth Amendment enforcement power that increase the rights of citizens beyond what the judiciary has recognized.

Court membership
- Chief Justice Earl Warren Associate Justices Hugo Black · William O. Douglas; Tom C. Clark · John M. Harlan II; William J. Brennan Jr. · Potter Stewart; Byron White · Abe Fortas

Case opinions
- Majority: Brennan, joined by Warren, Black, Clark, White, Fortas
- Concurrence: Douglas
- Dissent: Harlan, joined by Stewart

Laws applied
- U.S. Const. amend. XIV; Voting Rights Act of 1965: Section 4(e)

Katzenbach v. Morgan, 384 U.S. 641 (1966), is a landmark decision of the Supreme Court of the United States regarding the power of Congress, pursuant to Section 5 of the Fourteenth Amendment, to enact laws that enforce and interpret provisions of the Constitution.

== Background ==
Prior to the 1960s, many US states and municipalities used literacy tests to disenfranchise minorities. In 1959, the Supreme Court of the United States held, in Lassiter v. Northampton County Board of Elections, that literacy tests were not necessarily violations of the Equal Protection Clause of the Fourteenth Amendment, nor of the Fifteenth Amendment.

In 1965, Congress passed the Voting Rights Act of 1965, which sought to safeguard the voting rights of disenfranchised minorities. Among other provisions, the Voting Rights Act made some literacy tests illegal. Section 4(e) was aimed at securing the franchisement of New York City's large Puerto Rican population and "provides that no person who has completed the sixth grade in a public school, or an accredited private school, in Puerto Rico in which the language of instruction was other than English shall be disfranchised for inability to read or write English."

Registered voters in the state of New York brought suit by alleging that Congress exceeded its powers of enforcement under the Fourteenth Amendment and alleging that Congress infringed on rights reserved to states by the Tenth Amendment.

== Decision ==
By a 7–2 decision, the Supreme Court sided with Attorney General Nicholas Katzenbach, reversed the District Court, and held that Section 4(e) was constitutional. Writing the majority opinion, Justice Brennan stressed that Section 5 of the 14th Amendment is "a positive grant of legislative power authorizing Congress to exercise its discretion in determining the need for and nature of legislation to secure Fourteenth Amendment guarantees." Justice Brennan applied the appropriateness standard of McCulloch v. Maryland (1819) to determine whether the legislation passed constitutional muster.

Section 4(e) arguably expanded rights beyond what the Court had recognized in Lassiter, but Brennan ruled that Section 4(e) was appropriate. In doing so, he has often been credited with introducing the "ratchet theory" for congressional legislation enacted under Section 5 of the 14th Amendment. It held that Congress could ratchet up civil rights beyond what the Court had recognized, but Congress could not ratchet down judicially recognized rights. The "ratchet theory" essentially set judicially recognized rights as a support on which Congress could expand if it so chose. According to the theory, Brennan's opinion allowed for multiple interpreters of the Fourteenth Amendment, as opposed to just that of the judiciary.

In dissent, Justice Harlan criticized the "ratchet theory" and the idea of multiple interpreters of the 14th Amendment. Harlan relied on the separation of powers doctrine to argue that allowing Congress to interpret the 14th Amendment undercut the power of the judiciary. He objected to Congress having the power to interpret the 14th Amendment substantively (to create new rights). Harlan argued that the appropriate use of the Section 5 of the 14th Amendment power was the enforcement of judicially-recognized 14th Amendment rights.

== Significance ==
Katzenbach v. Morgan is a prime example of judicial deference to Congressional authority. It allowed Congress great latitude in use of the Section 5 of the 14th Amendment.

The Supreme Court, 31 years after Katzenbach, revisited the "ratchet" interpretation, in the case of City of Boerne v. Flores (1997) and stated, "This is not a necessary interpretation, however, or even the best one." By striking down the state application of the Religious Freedom Restoration Act of 1993, it addressed the separation of powers concerns that had been voiced earlier by Harlan.

== See also ==
- List of United States Supreme Court cases, volume 384
