= 2008 United States presidential election in Alabama =

- November 4, 2008
- Turnout: 73.77% ▲

Nominee	John McCain	Barack Obama
Party	Republican	Democratic
Home state	Arizona	Illinois
Running mate	Sarah Palin	Joe Biden
Electoral vote	9	0
Popular vote	1,266,546	813,479
Percentage	60.32%	38.74%

McCain
40–50%
50–60%
60–70%
70–80%
80–90%
90–100%
Obama
40–50%
50–60%
60–70%
70–80%
80–90%
90–100%
President before election
George W. Bush
Republican
Elected President
Barack Obama
Democratic

The 2008 United States presidential election in Alabama took place on November 4, 2008, and was part of the 2008 United States presidential election. Voters chose nine representatives, or electors, to the Electoral College, who voted for president and vice president.

Alabama was won by Republican nominee John McCain by a 21.58% margin of victory. Prior to the election, 17 news organizations considered this a state McCain would win, or a safe red state. Located in the Deep South, Alabama is one of the most conservative states in the country. Republicans have won every presidential election in Alabama since 1980, and the 2008 election was no exception. McCain carried 54 of the state's 67 counties and easily prevailed in Alabama.

Despite McCain's expected victory, Obama did manage to improve on Kerry's performance by two points and was able to reduce his margin of defeat by four points which is attributed to the higher African-American turnout. In addition, Obama's raw vote total was the highest obtained by a Democrat in the state of Alabama until his running mate, Biden, broke his record 12 years later in a historically high turnout election. Obama also managed to flip Jefferson County, the state's most populous county and home to Birmingham, which had not gone Democratic since 1952 and was won by incumbent Senator Jeff Sessions in the concurrent U.S. Senate election. Marengo County also split tickets for Obama and Sessions.

== Primaries ==
- 2008 Alabama Democratic presidential primary
- 2008 Alabama Republican presidential primary

== Campaign ==
=== Predictions ===
There were 16 news organizations who made state-by-state predictions of the election. Here are their last predictions before election day:

Source	Ranking
D.C. Political Report	Likely R
Cook Political Report	Solid R
The Takeaway	Solid R
Electoral-vote.com	Solid R
Washington Post	Solid R
Politico	Solid R
RealClearPolitics	Solid R
FiveThirtyEight	Solid R
CQ Politics	Solid R
The New York Times	Solid R
CNN	Safe R
NPR	Solid R
MSNBC	Solid R
Fox News	Likely R
Associated Press	Likely R
Rasmussen Reports	Safe R

=== Polling ===
Opinion polls taken in Alabama prior to the election consistently showed John McCain to be leading Barack Obama by double digits. RealClearPolitics gave the state an average of 56.8% for McCain, compared to 33.5% for Obama. The state was not seriously contested by either campaign.

=== Fundraising ===
John McCain raised a total of $1,846,574 in the state. Barack Obama raised $1,734,629.

=== Advertising and visits ===
Obama spent almost $264,945. McCain and his interest groups spent just $850. Barack Obama, made at least one stop in the state, a brief visit to the Heritage Club for a Democratic Fundraiser in Huntsville, AL

== Analysis ==
Alabama is one of the most conservative states in the country and one of the most reliably Republican strongholds in presidential elections. Alabama is located in the lower Bible Belt, where many people are values voters who tend to oppose social issues like abortion, gay rights, and immigration. Like most Southern states, Alabama was a one-party state dominated by conservative Democrats for the better part of a century after Reconstruction. However, it swung dramatically to the Republicans in 1964 in opposition to civil rights legislation. Since then, Democrats have carried the state only once, when Jimmy Carter of neighboring Georgia swept most of the South and East Coast. Although Democrats still maintained a majority of registered voters at the time of the 2008 elections, the Democrats have only seriously contested the state two other times since Barry Goldwater carried it in 1964; 1976 (a double-digit victory) and 1980. As in much of the Deep South, Alabama Democrats began splitting their tickets as early as the 1940s when the national party became more receptive toward the Civil Rights Movement, and the rise of the religious right in the 1970s only accelerated this trend.

At the time of the election, Alabama had a Republican Governor (Bob Riley), two Republicans in the U.S. Senate (Richard Shelby and Jeff Sessions), and five of its seven seats in the U.S. House of Representatives were held by Republicans.

On November 4, 2008, Democratic presidential nominee Barack Obama predictably lost by a landslide. However, he performed 2% better in 2008 than John Kerry did in 2004 (both by popular vote and by the number of carried counties). In large part, this can be attributed to high turnout of African American voters in Alabama. Notably, Obama carried Jefferson County, which contains the state's largest city of Birmingham, which last supported the official Democratic candidate for president in 1956. Strangely, many news organizations did not project the state's outcome immediately after the polls closed, possibly due to a wavering African American turnout.

Voting in Alabama, like in other states of the Deep South, was heavily polarized by race. According to exit polls, 98% of black Alabamians voted Democratic while 88% of white Alabamians voted Republican. Obama's 12 percent showing among white Alabamians was easily his worst in the nation, and prevented him from having any realistic chance of carrying the state. Ultimately, McCain won by running up massive landslides in the state's suburban areas; several Birmingham, Montgomery and Mobile suburbs gave McCain over 70 percent of the vote. The old-line Dixiecrats in these areas began splitting their tickets as early as the 1940s; apart from Carter, some of these areas haven't supported a Democrat for president since Adlai Stevenson II in 1952.

Racial polarization was why Obama generally improved on Kerry's performance in Central Alabama, where more African Americans live. Conversely, Obama did much worse than Kerry in North Alabama, where fewer blacks live. Racial polarization was also responsible for Alabama's electoral geography: Obama, like other Democrats, won landslides in the Black Belt while losing badly everywhere else. With 60.32% of the popular vote, Alabama proved to be McCain's fifth strongest state in the 2008 election after Oklahoma, Wyoming, Utah and Idaho.

== Results ==
Party	Candidate	Running mate	Votes	Percentage	Electoral votes
Republican	John McCain	Sarah Palin	1,266,546	60.32%	9
Democratic	Barack Obama	Joe Biden	813,479	38.74%	0
Independent	Ralph Nader	Matt Gonzalez	6,788	0.32%	0
Libertarian	Bob Barr	Wayne Allyn Root	4,991	0.24%	0
Constitution	Chuck Baldwin	Darrell Castle	4,310	0.21%	0
Write-in candidates			3,705	0.18%	0
Totals			2,099,819	100.00%	9

=== By county ===
County	John McCain Republican		Barack Obama Democratic		Various candidates Other parties		Margin		Total
County	#	%	#	%	#	%	#	%	Total
Autauga	17,403	73.61%	6,093	25.77%	145	0.61%	11,310	47.84%	23,641
Baldwin	61,271	75.26%	19,386	23.81%	756	0.93%	41,885	51.45%	81,413
Barbour	5,866	50.44%	5,697	48.99%	67	0.58%	169	1.45%	11,630
Bibb	6,262	72.44%	2,299	26.60%	83	0.96%	3,963	45.84%	8,644
Blount	20,389	84.02%	3,522	14.51%	356	1.46%	16,867	69.51%	24,267
Bullock	1,391	25.69%	4,011	74.07%	13	0.24%	-2,620	-48.38%	5,415
Butler	5,485	56.49%	4,188	43.14%	36	0.37%	1,297	13.35%	9,709
Calhoun	32,348	65.69%	16,334	33.17%	560	1.14%	16,014	32.52%	49,242
Chambers	8,067	53.94%	6,799	45.46%	90	0.60%	1,268	8.48%	14,956
Cherokee	7,298	74.89%	2,306	23.66%	141	1.44%	4,992	51.23%	9,745
Chilton	13,960	78.49%	3,674	20.66%	151	0.85%	10,286	57.83%	17,785
Choctaw	4,223	53.50%	3,636	46.06%	35	0.44%	587	7.44%	7,894
Clarke	7,466	55.57%	5,914	44.02%	55	0.41%	1,552	11.55%	13,435
Clay	4,984	73.09%	1,760	25.81%	75	1.10%	3,224	47.28%	6,819
Cleburne	5,216	80.35%	1,168	17.99%	108	1.66%	4,048	62.36%	6,492
Coffee	14,919	74.12%	5,079	25.23%	130	0.65%	9,840	48.89%	20,128
Colbert	14,739	59.33%	9,703	39.06%	401	1.61%	5,036	20.27%	24,843
Conecuh	3,470	49.98%	3,429	49.39%	44	0.63%	41	0.59%	6,943
Coosa	3,248	58.39%	2,273	40.86%	42	0.76%	975	17.53%	5,563
Covington	12,444	78.82%	3,240	20.52%	103	0.65%	9,204	58.30%	15,787
Crenshaw	4,319	68.65%	1,938	30.81%	34	0.54%	2,381	37.84%	6,291
Cullman	28,896	81.85%	5,864	16.61%	545	1.53%	23,032	65.24%	35,305
Dale	13,886	71.87%	5,270	27.28%	164	0.85%	8,616	44.59%	19,320
Dallas	6,798	32.60%	13,986	67.07%	68	0.33%	-7,188	-34.47%	20,852
DeKalb	17,957	74.77%	5,658	23.56%	400	1.67%	12,299	51.21%	24,015
Elmore	25,777	75.12%	8,301	24.19%	237	0.69%	17,476	50.93%	34,315
Escambia	9,375	63.89%	5,188	35.36%	111	0.76%	4,187	28.53%	14,674
Etowah	30,595	68.39%	13,497	30.17%	645	1.44%	17,098	38.22%	44,737
Fayette	5,883	73.93%	1,994	25.06%	80	1.01%	3,889	48.87%	7,957
Franklin	8,048	68.83%	3,469	29.67%	176	1.51%	4,579	39.16%	11,693
Geneva	9,417	80.78%	2,134	18.31%	106	0.90%	7,283	62.47%	11,657
Greene	876	16.51%	4,408	83.09%	21	0.40%	-3,532	-66.58%	5,305
Hale	3,200	38.96%	4,982	60.65%	32	0.39%	-1,782	-21.69%	8,214
Henry	5,585	64.58%	3,018	34.90%	45	0.52%	2,567	29.68%	8,648
Houston	29,254	70.09%	12,225	29.29%	256	0.61%	17,029	40.80%	41,735
Jackson	14,083	67.47%	6,374	30.54%	417	1.99%	7,709	36.93%	20,874
Jefferson	149,921	47.07%	166,121	52.15%	2,482	0.78%	-16,200	-5.08%	318,524
Lamar	5,419	76.59%	1,614	22.81%	42	0.60%	3,805	53.78%	7,075
Lauderdale	24,068	63.16%	13,329	34.98%	707	1.86%	10,739	28.18%	38,104
Lawrence	9,277	63.19%	5,164	35.18%	239	1.63%	4,113	28.01%	14,680
Lee	32,230	59.33%	21,498	39.57%	597	1.09%	10,732	19.76%	54,325
Limestone	23,598	70.33%	9,536	28.42%	417	1.24%	14,062	41.91%	33,551
Lowndes	1,809	24.86%	5,449	74.87%	20	0.27%	-3,640	-50.01%	7,278
Macon	1,396	12.83%	9,450	86.88%	31	0.29%	-8,054	-74.05%	10,877
Madison	86,965	56.88%	64,117	41.93%	1,817	1.19%	22,848	14.95%	152,899
Marengo	5,516	48.09%	5,926	51.66%	29	0.29%	-410	-3.57%	11,471
Marion	9,536	77.18%	2,600	21.04%	219	1.78%	6,936	56.14%	12,355
Marshall	25,727	77.57%	7,038	21.22%	401	1.21%	18,689	56.35%	33,166
Mobile	98,049	54.04%	82,181	45.30%	1,194	0.66%	15,868	8.74%	181,424
Monroe	6,175	54.88%	5,025	44.66%	52	0.46%	1,150	10.22%	11,252
Montgomery	42,031	40.13%	62,166	59.35%	546	0.52%	-20,135	-19.22%	104,743
Morgan	36,014	71.26%	13,895	27.49%	633	1.26%	22,119	43.77%	50,542
Perry	1,679	27.26%	4,457	72.37%	23	0.37%	-2,778	-45.11%	6,159
Pickens	5,434	53.98%	4,594	45.63%	39	0.39%	840	8.35%	10,067
Pike	8,004	57.36%	5,879	42.13%	72	0.52%	2,125	15.23%	13,955
Randolph	7,175	69.10%	3,064	29.51%	145	1.39%	4,111	39.59%	10,384
Russell	8,705	46.02%	10,085	53.32%	125	0.66%	-1,380	-7.30%	18,915
Shelby	69,060	76.19%	20,625	22.75%	958	1.06%	48,435	53.44%	90,643
St. Clair	27,649	81.11%	6,091	17.87%	348	1.02%	21,558	63.24%	34,088
Sumter	1,731	24.66%	5,264	74.99%	25	0.36%	-3,533	-50.33%	7,020
Talladega	20,112	58.80%	13,779	40.28%	313	0.92%	6,333	18.52%	34,204
Tallapoosa	13,116	67.92%	6,063	31.40%	132	0.68%	7,053	36.52%	19,311
Tuscaloosa	45,405	57.54%	32,796	41.56%	711	0.90%	12,609	15.98%	78,912
Walker	20,722	72.32%	7,420	25.90%	510	1.78%	13,302	46.42%	28,652
Washington	5,654	64.43%	3,067	34.95%	54	0.61%	2,587	29.48%	8,775
Wilcox	1,868	28.77%	4,612	71.02%	14	0.22%	-2,744	-42.25%	6,494
Winston	8,103	80.78%	1,757	17.52%	171	1.71%	6,346	63.26%	10,031
Totals	1,266,546	60.32%	813,479	38.74%	19,794	0.94%	453,067	21.58%	2,099,819

Counties that flipped from Republican to Democratic

- Jefferson (largest municipality: Birmingham)
- Marengo (largest municipality: Linden)

=== By congressional district ===
Republican John McCain carried six of the state's seven congressional districts, including two districts that were carried by Democrats.

District	McCain	Obama	Representative
1st	61.01%	38.38%	Jo Bonner
2nd	63.42%	36.05%	Terry Everett (110th Congress)
2nd	63.42%	36.05%	Bobby Bright (111th Congress)
3rd	56.21%	43.04%	Mike D. Rogers
4th	76.32%	22.48%	Robert Aderholt
5th	60.91%	37.99%	Bud Cramer (110th Congress)
5th	60.91%	37.99%	Parker Griffith (111th Congress)
6th	75.91%	23.28%	Spencer Bachus
7th	27.28%	72.36%	Artur Davis

== Electors ==
Technically the voters of Alabama cast their ballots for electors: representatives to the Electoral College. Alabama is allocated 9 electors because it has 7 congressional districts and 2 senators. All candidates who appear on the ballot or qualify to receive write-in votes must submit a list of 9 electors, who pledge to vote for their candidate and their running mate. Whoever wins the majority of votes in the state is awarded all 9 electoral votes. Their chosen electors then vote for president and vice president. Although electors are pledged to their candidate and running mate, they are not obligated to vote for them. An elector who votes for someone other than their candidate is known as a faithless elector.

The electors of each state and the District of Columbia met on December 15, 2008, to cast their votes for president and vice president. The Electoral College itself never meets as one body. Instead the electors from each state and the District of Columbia met in their respective capitols.

The following were the members of the Electoral College from the state. All 9 were pledged to John McCain and Sarah Palin.

1. Les Barnett
2. Will Sellers
3. Al Blythe
4. Jack Stiefel
5. Elbert Peters
6. Matthew Fridy
7. Bob Cusanelli
8. Cam Ward
9. Jim Wilson

== See also ==
- United States presidential elections in Alabama
