= Thornburg v. Gingles =

- Supreme Court of the United States

Argued December 4, 1985 Decided June 30, 1986
- Full case name: Lacy Thornburg, Attorney General of North Carolina, et al. v. Ralph Gingles, et al.
- Citations: 478 U.S. 30 (more) 106 S. Ct. 2752; 92 L. Ed. 2d 25; 1986 U.S. LEXIS 121; 54 U.S.L.W. 4877; 4 Fed. R. Serv. 3d (Callaghan) 1082

Case history
- Prior: Gingles v. Edmisten, 590 F. Supp. 345 (E.D.N.C. 1984).

Holding
- The inquiry into the existence of vote dilution caused by submergence in a multimember district is district specific. A successful claim under Section 2 of the Voting Rights Act of 1965 requires evidence that an affected minority group is sufficiently large to elect a representative of its choice, that the minority group is politically cohesive, and white majority voters cast their ballots sufficiently as a bloc to usually defeat the preferred candidates of the minority group.

Court membership
- Chief Justice Warren E. Burger Associate Justices William J. Brennan Jr. · Byron White; Thurgood Marshall · Harry Blackmun; Lewis F. Powell Jr. · William Rehnquist; John P. Stevens · Sandra Day O'Connor

Case opinions
- Majority: Brennan (Parts I, II, III–A, III–B, IV–A, V), joined by White, Marshall, Blackmun, Stevens
- Plurality: Brennan (Part III–C), joined by Marshall, Blackmun, Stevens
- Plurality: Brennan (Part IV–B), joined by White
- Concurrence: White
- Concurrence: O'Connor (in judgment), joined by Burger, Powell, Rehnquist
- Concur/dissent: Stevens, joined by Marshall, Blackmun

Laws applied
- Voting Rights Act § 2

Thornburg v. Gingles, 478 U.S. 30 (1986), was a United States Supreme Court case in which a unanimous Court found that "the legacy of official discrimination [...] and the persistence of campaign appeals to racial prejudice acted in concert with the multimember districting scheme to impair the ability of geographically insular and politically cohesive groups of black voters to participate equally in the political process and to elect candidates of their choice." The ruling resulted in the invalidation of districts in the North Carolina General Assembly and led to more single-member districts in state legislatures.

== Background ==
=== Legislative history ===
Section 2 of the Voting Rights Act of 1965 prohibits any jurisdiction from implementing a "voting qualification or prerequisite to voting, or standard, practice, or procedure ... in a manner which results in a denial or abridgement of the right ... to vote on account of race," color, or language minority status. The Supreme Court has allowed private plaintiffs to sue to enforce this prohibition. In City of Mobile v. Bolden (1980), the Supreme Court held that as originally enacted in 1965, Section 2 simply restated the Fifteenth Amendment and thus prohibited only those voting laws that were intentionally enacted or maintained for a discriminatory purpose. Congress responded by passing an amendment to the Voting Rights Act which President Ronald Reagan signed into law on June 29, 1982. Congress's amended Section 2 to create a "results" test, which prohibits any voting law that has a discriminatory effect irrespective of whether the law was intentionally enacted or maintained for a discriminatory purpose. The 1982 amendments provided that the results test does not guarantee protected minorities a right to proportional representation.

When determining whether a jurisdiction's election law violates this general prohibition courts relied on factors enumerated in the Senate Judiciary Committee report associated with the 1982 amendments ("Senate Factors"), including:

1. The history of official discrimination in the jurisdiction that affects the right to vote;
2. The degree to which voting in the jurisdiction is racially polarized;
3. The extent of the jurisdiction's use of majority vote requirements, unusually large electoral districts, prohibitions on bullet voting, and other devices that tend to enhance the opportunity for voting discrimination;
4. Whether minority candidates are denied access to the jurisdiction's candidate slating processes, if any;
5. The extent to which the jurisdiction's minorities are discriminated against in socioeconomic areas, such as education, employment, and health;
6. Whether overt or subtle racial appeals in campaigns exist;
7. The extent to which minority candidates have won elections;
8. The degree that elected officials are unresponsive to the concerns of the minority group; and
9. Whether the policy justification for the challenged law is tenuous.

The report indicates not all or a majority of these factors need to exist for an electoral device to result in discrimination, and it also indicates that this list is not exhaustive, allowing courts to consider additional evidence at their discretion.

Section 2 prohibits two types of discrimination: "vote denial", in which a person is denied the opportunity to cast a ballot or to have their vote properly counted, and "vote dilution", in which the strength or effectiveness of a person's vote is diminished. Most Section 2 litigation has concerned vote dilution, especially claims that a jurisdiction's redistricting plan or use of at-large/multimember elections prevents minority voters from casting sufficient votes to elect their preferred candidates. An at-large election can dilute the votes cast by minority voters by allowing a cohesive majority group to win every legislative seat in the jurisdiction. Redistricting plans can be gerrymandered to dilute votes cast by minorities by "packing" high numbers of minority voters into a small number of districts or "cracking" minority groups by placing small numbers of minority voters into a large number of districts.

=== Procedural history ===
In July 1981 the North Carolina General Assembly enacted a redistricting plan in response to the 1980 United States census. In September 1981 plaintiffs sued North Carolina Attorney General Rufus L. Edmisten, alleging their votes would be submerged by multimember districts in violation of Section 2 of the Voting Rights Act. Meanwhile, in June 1982 Congress amended the Voting Rights Act, extending Section 5 and substantially revising Section 2. In January 1984 a special three-judge district court in the United States District Court for the Eastern District of North Carolina made up of Circuit Judge James Dickson Phillips, Chief District Judge William Earl Britt, and Senior District Judge Franklin Taylor Dupree Jr. agreed, finding that all the challenged districts violated Section 2 of the Voting Rights Act, and enjoined holding any elections under the General Assembly's redistricting plan.

North Carolina Attorney General Lacy Thornburg directly appealed to the Supreme Court of the United States. The case was argued on December 4, 1985, with Attorney General Thornburg appearing himself, and the Solicitor General of the United States Charles Fried also appearing, both arguing for reversal. Julius L. Chambers argued for the respondents. Chambers was supported by co-counsels, Lani Guinier, and Leslie Winner.

== Opinion of the Court ==
On June 30, 1986, the last day of the term, the Supreme Court announced its decision, alongside Davis v. Bandemer and Bowers v. Hardwick. The Supreme Court unanimously affirmed that there were Section 2 violations in all of the statehouse districts except the Durham County, North Carolina multimember district, which a majority reversed. In an opinion by Justice William J. Brennan joined partially by Justices Byron White, Thurgood Marshall, Harry Blackmun, and John Paul Stevens the Court used the term "vote dilution through submergence" to describe claims that a jurisdiction's use of an at-large/multimember election system or gerrymandered redistricting plan diluted minority votes, and it established a legal framework for assessing such claims under Section 2. (Note: In Gingles, the Supreme Court held that the Gingles test applies to claims that an at-large election scheme results in vote dilution. The Court later held, in Growe v. Emison, 507 U.S. 25 (1993), that the Gingles test also applies to claims that a redistricting plan results in vote dilution through the arrangement of single-member districts.) Under the Gingles test, plaintiffs must show the existence of three preconditions:

1. The racial or language minority group "sufficiently large and geographically compact to constitute a majority in a single-member district";
2. The minority group is "politically cohesive" (meaning its members tend to vote similarly); and
3. The "majority votes sufficiently as a bloc to enable it ... usually to defeat the minority's preferred candidate."

The first precondition is known as the "compactness" requirement and concerns whether a majority-minority district can be created. The second and third preconditions are collectively known as the "racially polarized voting" or "racial bloc voting" requirement, and they concern whether the voting patterns of the different racial groups are different from each other. If a plaintiff proves these preconditions exist, then the plaintiff must additionally show, using the remaining Senate Factors and other evidence, that under the "totality of the circumstances", the jurisdiction's redistricting plan or use of at-large or multimember elections diminishes the ability of the minority group to elect candidates of its choice.

=== Plurality opinion ===
Justice Brennan goes on, in a section Justice White refused to join, to reject the Solicitor General's argument that a multiple regression analysis is needed to take into account the other socioeconomic factors that might influence voting patterns. According to the plurality, race is the determinant, not a mere corollary, of voter behavior. As illustration Justice Brennan notes that 47.8% of the black population of Halifax County, North Carolina lives in poverty, compared with only 12.6% of whites. Because race, and only race, is the relevant evidence of polarized voting, the four justices believed the lower court correctly relied only on an ecological regression and bivariate analysis.

=== Concurrence ===
Justice White wrote separately to note that he disagreed with Justice Brennan's view that only voters' race can be relevant evidence of polarized voting. For Justice White the race of the candidates also mattered; it would not be racially polarized if white voters elected a black candidate not supported by black voters. Without Justice White's fifth vote Justice Brennan's section on the relevant evidence only carried the authority of a plurality opinion.

=== Concurrence in judgment ===
Justice Sandra Day O'Connor, joined by Chief Justice Warren E. Burger, Justice Lewis F. Powell, Jr., and Justice William Rehnquist concurred in the judgment only. Justice O'Connor, a former Arizona statehouse legislator, began by noting that Senator Bob Dole, "the architect of the compromise", had insisted the 1982 amendment explicitly disclaim any right to racially proportional representation. Nevertheless, Justice O'Connor sees the majority opinion as attempting to create a right to "usual, roughly proportional representation". Justice O'Connor next agrees with Justice White that the plurality was wrong to insist the only relevant evidence is the race of the voters. She writes that the law does not permit "an arbitrary rule against consideration of all evidence considering voting preferences".

=== Concurrence in part and dissent in part ===
Justice Stevens, joined by Justices Marshall and Blackmun, joined the Court in affirming the three judge district court but dissented from reversing the judgment regarding the Durham County multimember district. Justice Stevens wrote that although Durham County had elected a black candidate in every election since 1972, the multimember district still violates the Voting Rights Act considering "the political realities of the State". Furthermore, Justice Stevens felt reversing without a remand was "mystifying" and "also extremely unfair."

== Subsequent developments ==
Subsequent litigation further defined the contours of "vote dilution through submergence" claims. In Bartlett v. Strickland (2009), the Supreme Court held that the first Gingles precondition can be satisfied only if a district can be drawn in which the minority group comprises a majority of voting-age citizens. This means that plaintiffs cannot succeed on a submergence claim in jurisdictions where the size of the minority group, despite not being large enough to comprise a majority in a district, is large enough for its members to elect their preferred candidates with the help of "crossover" votes from some members of the majority group. In contrast, the Supreme Court has not addressed whether different protected minority groups can be aggregated to satisfy the Gingles preconditions as a coalition, and lower courts have split on the issue. (Note: The Courts of Appeals in the Fifth Circuit, Eleventh Circuit, and Ninth Circuit have either explicitly held that coalition suits are allowed under Section 2 or assumed that such suits are permissible, while those in the Sixth Circuit and Seventh Circuit have rejected such suits.)

The Supreme Court provided additional guidance on the "totality of the circumstances" test in Johnson v. De Grandy (1994). The Court emphasized that the existence of the three Gingles preconditions may be insufficient to prove liability for vote dilution through submergence if other factors weigh against such a determination, especially in lawsuits challenging redistricting plans. In particular, the Court held that even where the three Gingles preconditions are satisfied, a jurisdiction is unlikely to be liable for vote dilution if its redistricting plan contains a number of majority-minority districts that is proportional to the minority group's population. The decision thus clarified that Section 2 does not require jurisdictions to maximize the number of majority-minority districts. The opinion also distinguished the proportionality of majority-minority districts, which allows minorities to have a proportional opportunity to elect their candidates of choice, from the proportionality of election results, which Section 2 explicitly does not guarantee to minorities.

An issue regarding the third Gingles precondition remains unresolved. In Gingles, the Supreme Court split as to whether plaintiffs must prove that the majority racial group votes as a bloc specifically because its members are motivated to vote based on racial considerations and not other considerations that may overlap with race, such as party affiliation. A plurality of justices said that requiring such proof would violate Congress's intent to make Section 2 a "results" test, but Justice White maintained that the proof was necessary to show that an electoral scheme results in racial discrimination. Since Gingles, lower courts have split on the issue. (Note: Courts of Appeals in the Second Circuit and Fourth Circuit have held that such proof is not an absolute requirement for liability but is a relevant additional factor under the "totality of the circumstances" test. In contrast, the Fifth Circuit has held that such proof is a required component of the third precondition.)

Statisticians have observed that the Court's approach is invalidated by the ecological fallacy. Social scientists have found that federal judges vary widely when applying the Gingles preconditions. Three judge courts made up of all Democratic appointees have ruled in favor of Section 2 liability in 41% of cases, contrasted with 11% under the all Republican appointed panels.

North Carolina would face continued redistricting woes after the 1990 United States census. In Shaw v. Reno (1993) the Supreme Court 5-4 struck down North Carolina's attempt to create two majority minority districts. After hearing the case three more times, in Easley v. Cromartie (2001) the Supreme Court would 5-4 uphold the redistricting because the General Assembly's motivations had been purely political.

In Louisiana v. Callais (2026), the Supreme Court ruled that a minority district created in a redrawn map for Louisiana to match the state's demographics was an illegal racial gerrymander. The opinion described four major developments that had taken place since Gingles that put additional requirements to judicate Section 2 claims, making Section 2 challenges more difficult.

== See also ==
- List of United States Supreme Court cases, volume 478
