= Abha (disambiguation) =

Abha is the capital of Asir province in Saudi Arabia.

Abha may also refer to:

- Abha (football club), a Saudi Arabian football team
- Abha Dawesar (b. 1974), Indian novelist
- Abha Khanna, American attorney
- Abha (Bahá'í), Arabic for "Most Glorious", the name of Heaven in the Bahá'í Faith
- Abha (tetragraph)
