= 2008 Alabama Republican presidential primary =

- February 5, 2008

45 pledged delegates to the 2008 Republican National Convention

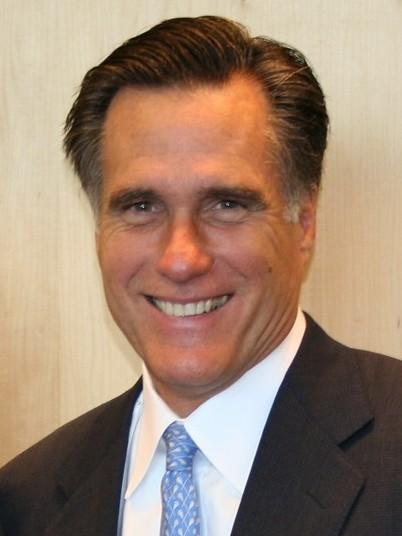
Candidate	Mike Huckabee	John McCain	Mitt Romney
Home state	Arkansas	Arizona	Massachusetts
Delegate count	26	19	0
Popular vote	227,766	204,867	98,019
Percentage	41.25%	37.10%	17.75%
- County results Mike Huckabee John McCain

The 2008 Alabama Republican presidential primary was held on February 5 (Super Tuesday) and had a total of 45 delegates at stake. The winner in each of the 7 congressional districts was awarded all of that district's delegates.

== Results ==
Official results
Candidate	Votes	Percentage	Delegates
Mike Huckabee	227,766	41.25%	26
John McCain	204,867	37.10%	19
Mitt Romney	98,019	17.75%	0
Ron Paul	14,810	2.68%	0
Rudy Giuliani*	2,134	0.39%	0
Other (5 candidates)	3,325	0.60%	0
Uncommitted	1,234	0.22%	0
Total	552,155	100%	45

*Candidate withdrew prior to primary.

== See also ==
- 2008 Alabama Democratic presidential primary
- 2008 Republican Party presidential primaries
