= List of majority-minority United States congressional districts =

A majority‑minority congressional district is a United States congressional district in which racial or ethnic minorities together make up more than half of the population. Some of these districts were drawn to comply with Section 2 of the Voting Rights Act of 1965, which was previously believed to always prohibit districting plans that diluted the ability of racial or language minorities to elect candidates of their choice. However, in its Louisiana v. Callais decision in 2026, the U.S. Supreme Court ruled that no majority‑minority district is mandated by the Act. Many such districts result from demographic patterns or partisan considerations.

As of the 119th Congress (2025), there are 120 majority‑minority congressional districts. Only a fraction of these districts are mandated by the Voting Rights Act — about 30 to 40 nationwide — while the remainder are partisan‑constructed or demographic outcomes.

The adoption of majority‑minority districts is contested both within and outside minority communities. Critics argue that such districts can dilute minority political power by "packing" voters into fewer districts, or that they resemble racial segregation. Supporters contend that they are necessary to ensure minorities can elect representatives and achieve descriptive representation in the House of Representatives.

Majority‑minority districts have been the subject of significant constitutional litigation, including Shaw v. Reno (1993), Miller v. Johnson (1995), and Bush v. Vera (1996), which examined the balance between Voting Rights Act compliance and constitutional limits on racial gerrymandering.

Notes:

- Estimates of VRA‑mandated districts vary because the determination depends on applying the Thornburg v. Gingles test (1986), which requires that a minority group be sufficiently large, geographically compact, politically cohesive, and consistently outvoted.
- Scholars and legal analysts generally place the number of mandated districts between 30 and 40 nationwide, with the remainder arising from partisan map‑drawing or demographic concentration.

== Section 2 requirements under the Voting Rights Act ==
Section 2 of the Voting Rights Act requires minority-opportunity districts in geographical areas in which minority voters would otherwise have "less opportunity than other members of the electorate ... to elect representatives of their choice." In Thornburg v. Gingles (1986), the Supreme Court held that Section 2 may necessitate the creation of a majority-minority district when (a) the minority population is "sufficiently large and geographically compact" to form a district and (b) both the majority and minority populations are sufficiently politically polarized that the majority can vote "usually to defeat the minority's preferred candidate."

Bartlett v. Strickland (2009) clarified the Gingles interpretation of Section 2 by holding that the minority group must constitute "more than 50 percent of the voting-age population in the relevant geographic area." Plaintiffs challenging a districting plan under Section 2 typically provide remedial maps in which the minority group composes a majority in the relevant district, such as in Allen v. Milligan (2023) where plaintiffs included "illustrative districting maps... which contained two majority-black districts that comported with traditional districting criteria."

The Supreme Court has left unsettled the question of whether minority groups can be aggregated under Section 2 if they vote in coalition with one another, and federal circuit courts remain divided on the issue.

Because of this jurisprudence on Section 2, federal law requires the existence of many of the current majority-minority congressional districts.

== List of districts ==
Majority-minority districts in the 119th Congress: / African American majority/plurality / Asian American majority/plurality / Hispanic or Latino majority/plurality White plurality

The following tables identify districts that are either required under Section 2 of the Voting Rights Act or are otherwise drawn to be majority minority in accordance with traditional districting criteria or to gerrymander for partisan advantage. Voting-age population data in the tables below reflect 2020 census estimates for the 119th Congress. Members are accurate as of September 1, 2025.

=== African-American ===
As of 2026, there are 8 congressional districts where African Americans make up a majority of voting-age constituents and 19 other congressional districts where they make up a plurality. It has decreased primarily due to immigration from Latin America. Most of these districts are located in the South and are represented by an African American member of congress. Democrats represent each of these districts.

State	District	Member (119th Congress)	Afric. Amer. VAP (Note: "VAP" here refers to the voting-age population in a given district.)	Perc.
Mississippi	MS-02	Bennie Thompson	355,293	62.9%
Tennessee	TN-09	Steve Cohen (Note: Representative is not African American.)	351,812	60.2%
Maryland	MD-04	Glenn Ivey	358,207	55.2%
Maryland	MD-07	Kweisi Mfume	334,297	53.2%
Louisiana	LA-06	Cleo Fields	318,011	54.4%
New Jersey	NJ-10	LaMonica McIver	315,201	48.5%
Illinois	IL-01	Jonathan Jackson	306,380	49.7%
Alabama	AL-07	Terri Sewell	295,119	52.5%
Georgia	GA-06	Lucy McBath	307,240	54.8%
Georgia	GA-13	Vacant	294,376	49.6%
Georgia	GA-05	Nikema Williams	313,396	49.8%
Louisiana	LA-02	Troy Carter	305,124	50.4%
Pennsylvania	PA-03	Dwight Evans	320,864	49.9%
Georgia	GA-04	Hank Johnson	294,887	47.5%
Florida	FL-20	Vacant	298,383	49.1%
Georgia	GA-02	Sanford Bishop	289,612	49.0%
New York	NY-09	Yvette Clarke	294,000	40.6%
Alabama	AL-02	Shomari Figures	272,023	48.9%
Illinois	IL-02	Robin Kelly	280,964	49.5%
New York	NY-08	Hakeem Jeffries	297,616	42.2%
New York	NY-05	Gregory Meeks	291,168	40.2%
South Carolina	SC-06	Jim Clyburn	275,133	46.8%
Michigan	MI-13	Shri Thanedar	277,723	45.3%
Missouri	MO-01	Wesley Bell	276,602	46.1%
Virginia	VA-03	Bobby Scott	278,424	43.2%
Illinois	IL-07	Danny Davis	261,207	42.8%
Florida	FL-24	Frederica Wilson	258,005	39.8%
Texas	TX-30	Jasmine Crockett	242,224	40.0%

=== Asian American ===
Currently, there are two congressional districts where Asian Americans make up a majority of voting-age constituents and six other congressional districts where they make up a plurality. Most of these districts are located in California and are represented by an Asian American member of congress. Democrats represent each of these districts.

State	District	Member (119th Congress)	Asian Amer. VAP	Perc.
Hawaii	HI-01	Ed Case (Note: Representative is not Asian American.)	398,963	68.1%
California	CA-17	Ro Khanna	353,112	58.5%
New York	NY-06	Grace Meng	296,148	46.8%
Hawaii	HI-02	Jill Tokuda	247,592	43.4%
California	CA-45	Derek Tran	250,168	41.4%
California	CA-28	Judy Chu	256,185	41.4%
California	CA-15	Kevin Mullin	241,550	39.6%

=== Hispanic and Latino ===
Currently, there are 38 congressional districts where Hispanic or Latino Americans make up a majority of voting-age constituents and 9 other congressional districts where they make up a plurality. Most of these districts are represented by a Hispanic or Latino Democratic member of congress.

State	District	Member (119th Congress)	Hispanic or Latino VAP	Perc.
Texas	TX-34	Vicente Gonzalez	480,322	88.5%
Texas	TX-16	Veronica Escobar	463,686	80.8%
Texas	TX-15	Monica De La Cruz	434,980	78.9%
Florida	FL-27	María Elvira Salazar	471,763	74.2%
Florida	FL-28	Carlos Giménez	446,828	73.4%
Florida	FL-26	Mario Díaz-Balart	456,512	73.2%
Texas	TX-28	Henry Cuellar	402,711	72.9%
Texas	TX-29	Sylvia Garcia	396,804	72.4%
California	CA-22	David Valadao (Note: Representative is not Hispanic or Latino.)	376,448	69.3%
Texas	TX-20	Joaquin Castro	392,056	68.2%
Illinois	IL-04	Chuy García	356,197	63.2%
California	CA-34	Jimmy Gomez	376,198	61.6%
California	CA-35	Norma Torres	352,257	61.2%
California	CA-46	Lou Correa	354,631	61.2%
California	CA-29	Luz Rivas	362,530	61.1%
California	CA-42	Robert Garcia	358,174	61.1%
California	CA-18	Zoe Lofgren	346,468	60.8%
California	CA-21	Jim Costa	322,669	60.7%
California	CA-13	Adam Gray	330,757	60.7%
California	CA-25	Raul Ruiz	345,745	60.4%
Texas	TX-23	Vacant	340,976	60.0%
California	CA-33	Pete Aguilar	324,616	58.7%
California	CA-39	Mark Takano	328,249	58.5%
California	CA-38	Linda Sanchez	350,026	58.3%
Arizona	AZ-03	Yassamin Ansari	330,596	58.2%
California	CA-44	Nanette Barragan	339,063	57.9%
California	CA-31	Gil Cisneros	342,496	57.4%
California	CA-52	Juan Vargas	331,832	57.2%
New Mexico	NM-02	Gabe Vasquez	299,999	56.1%
Arizona	AZ-07	Adelita Grijalva	333,554	55.5%
Texas	TX-33	Marc Veasey	302,355	54.5%
California	CA-43	Maxine Waters	307,997	54.1%
Texas	TX-35	Greg Casar	299,295	51.3%
New York	NY-15	Ritchie Torres	300,901	51.1%
New York	NY-14	Alexandria Ocasio-Cortez	308,929	50.5%
New York	NY-13	Adriano Espaillat	318,682	50.4%
California	CA-37	Sydney Kamlager-Dove	298,131	50.3%
Florida	FL-09	Darren Soto	297,032	50.0%
Texas	TX-27	Michael Cloud	292,191	49.9%
New Jersey	NJ-08	Rob Menendez	299,470	48.9%
Illinois	IL-03	Delia Ramirez	257,871	43.8%
Florida	FL-25	Debbie Wasserman Schultz	256,630	42.3%
Texas	TX-18	Christian Menefee	229,406	39.8%
New Mexico	NM-03	Teresa Leger Fernandez	214,599	39.7%
California	CA-27	George T. Whitesides	224,434	39.2%
California	CA-09	Josh Harder	211,242	37.6%
California	CA-08	John Garamendi	185,553	31.5%

=== White plurality (majority-minority) ===
State	District	Member (119th Congress)	White VAP	Perc.	Largest Minority	Largest Minority Perc.
Michigan	MI-12	Rashida Tlaib	282,914	47.5%	Afric. Amer.	45.7%
Ohio	OH-11	Shontel Brown	277,075	44.5%	Afric. Amer.	44.3%
Maryland	MD-05	Steny Hoyer	272,785	45.7%	Afric. Amer.	43.0%
Virginia	VA-04	Jennifer McClellan	284,553	45.2%	Afric. Amer.	42.1%
North Carolina	NC-12	Alma Adams	229,032	39.5%	Afric. Amer.	38.3%
Wisconsin	WI-04	Gwen Moore	262,604	47.1%	Afric. Amer.	31.5%
Pennsylvania	PA-02	Brendan Boyle	244,883	41.3%	Afric. Amer.	26.2%
Massachusetts	MA-07	Ayanna Pressley	275,583	42.2%	Afric. Amer.	24.3%
Maryland	MD-08	Jamie Raskin	281,131	46.9%	Afric. Amer.	18.2%
California	CA-11	Nancy Pelosi	296,850	44.6%	Asian Amer.	34.2%
California	CA-16	Sam Liccardo	277,950	46.3%	Asian Amer.	32.1%
Washington	WA-09	Adam Smith	267,554	44.4%	Asian Amer.	26.7%
California	CA-07	Doris Matsui	204,018	35.0%	Asian Amer.	26.0%
California	CA-12	Lateefah Simon	218,543	35.2%	Asian Amer.	24.6%
New York	NY-10	Dan Goldman	314,959	49.7%	Asian Amer.	23.9%
Nevada	NV-03	Susie Lee	290,359	47.1%	Asian Amer.	20.8%
New Jersey	NJ-12	Bonnie Watson Coleman	263,386	43.5%	Asian Amer.	19.5%
California	CA-26	Julia Brownley	271,460	46.2%	Hispanic/Latino	39.1%
New Jersey	NJ-09	Nellie Pou	245,792	40.9%	Hispanic/Latino	39.1%
New Mexico	NM-01	Melanie Stansbury	278,556	49.4%	Hispanic/Latino	37.6%
California	CA-23	Jay Obernolte	251,946	44.1%	Hispanic/Latino	37.4%
Texas	TX-11	August Pfluger	270,981	47.7%	Hispanic/Latino	35.2%
New York	NY-07	Nydia Velázquez	229,017	36.8%	Hispanic/Latino	35.0%
California	CA-41	Ken Calvert	286,078	48.2%	Hispanic/Latino	34.2%
Texas	TX-32	Julie Johnson	214,855	36.2%	Hispanic/Latino	32.6%
Nevada	NV-01	Dina Titus	263,524	43.9%	Hispanic/Latino	32.2%
Nevada	NV-04	Steven Horsford	243,758	41.6%	Hispanic/Latino	30.6%
Texas	TX-06	Jake Ellzey	279,352	48.8%	Hispanic/Latino	30.2%
Texas	TX-08	Morgan Luttrell	276,028	48.8%	Hispanic/Latino	29.7%
Florida	FL-10	Maxwell Frost	235,180	38.5%	Hispanic/Latino	28.6%
Texas	TX-07	Lizzie Fletcher	179,683	30.2%	Hispanic/Latino	28.3%
New York	NY-16	George Latimer	252,636	41.7%	Hispanic/Latino	26.9%
Texas	TX-22	Troy Nehls	252,124	45.2%	Hispanic/Latino	26.3%
Florida	FL-14	Kathy Castor	306,560	49.4%	Hispanic/Latino	26.0%
California	CA-51	Sara Jacobs	294,681	48.6%	Hispanic/Latino	22.6%
New Jersey	NJ-06	Frank Pallone	276,011	45.2%	Hispanic/Latino	22.1%

== See also ==
- Majority minority
- Race in the United States
