= 2008 Alabama Democratic presidential primary =

- February 5, 2008

60 Democratic National Convention delegates (52 pledged, 8 unpledged)

Candidate	Barack Obama	Hillary Clinton
Home state	Illinois	New York
Delegate count	27	25
Popular vote	300,321	223,096
Percentage	56.0%	41.6%
- Primary results by county Clinton: 40–50% 50–60% 60–70% 70–80% 80–90% Obama: 50–60% 60–70% 70–80% 80–90%

The 2008 Alabama Democratic presidential primary was held on Super Tuesday, February 5, 2008, and had a total of 52 delegates at stake. The winner in each of Alabama's seven congressional districts was awarded all of that district's delegates, totaling 34. Another 18 delegates were awarded to the statewide winner, Barack Obama. The 52 delegates represented Alabama at the Democratic National Convention in Denver, Colorado. Eight other delegates were chosen on March 1, 2008, during an Alabama Democratic Party Executive Committee meeting. Those eight delegates attended the National Convention as officially unpledged.

== Results ==
Alabama Democratic presidential primary results – 2008
Party	Candidate	Votes	Percentage	Delegates
Democratic	Barack Obama	300,321	55.96%	27
Democratic	Hillary Clinton	223,096	41.57%	25
Democratic	John Edwards	7,841	1.46%	0
Democratic	Joe Biden	1,174	0.22%	0
Democratic	Bill Richardson	1,017	0.19%	0
Democratic	Christopher Dodd	523	0.10%	0
Democratic	Uncommitted	2,663	0.50%	0
Totals		536,635	100.00%	52
Voter turnout		%		—

== Analysis ==
With its heavily African American population, Barack Obama solidly defeated Hillary Clinton in Alabama. According to exit polls, 51 percent of voters in the Alabama Democratic Primary were African Americans and they opted for Obama by a margin of 84–15 compared to the 44 percent of white voters who backed Clinton by a margin of 72–25. Obama won all age groups and educational attainment levels in Alabama except senior citizens aged 65 and over and those who did not complete high school. Obama won voters who identified as Democrats but Clinton won those who identified as Republicans; both candidates split among Independents. Clinton won Protestants but Obama won those who identified as Other Christian (excluding Catholics) and agnostics/atheists.

Obama did best in the Black Belt counties in Alabama which are majority African American. He also performed extremely well in the urban areas of Birmingham, Montgomery, Mobile and Huntsville. Clinton performed best in Northern Alabama and did best in counties that were majority white.

== See also ==
- 2008 Alabama Republican presidential primary
