= Allen v. Milligan =

2023 U.S. Supreme Court case

- Supreme Court of the United States

Argued October 4, 2022 Decided June 8, 2023
- Full case name: Wes Allen, Alabama Secretary of State, et al. v. Evan Milligan, et al. Wes Allen, Alabama Secretary of State, et al. v. Marcus Caster, et al.
- Docket nos.: 21-1086; 21-1087
- Citations: 599 U.S. 1 (more)
- Argument: Oral argument
- Opinion announcement: Opinion announcement
- Decision: Opinion

Questions presented
- Whether the State of Alabama's 2021 redistricting plan for its seven seats in the United States House of Representatives violated Section 2 of the Voting Rights Act, 52 U.S.C. § 10301.

Holding
- Plaintiffs demonstrated a reasonable likelihood of success on their claim that Alabama's redistricting plan violates Section 2 of the Voting Rights Act of 1965.

Court membership
- Chief Justice John Roberts Associate Justices Clarence Thomas · Samuel Alito; Sonia Sotomayor · Elena Kagan; Neil Gorsuch · Brett Kavanaugh; Amy Coney Barrett · Ketanji Brown Jackson

Case opinions
- Majority: Roberts (except as to Part III–B–1), joined by Sotomayor, Kagan, Kavanaugh, Jackson
- Plurality: Roberts (Part III–B–1), joined by Sotomayor, Kagan, Jackson
- Concurrence: Kavanaugh (all but Part III–B–1)
- Dissent: Thomas, joined by Gorsuch; Alito (Parts II–A and II–B); Barrett (Parts II and III)
- Dissent: Alito, joined by Gorsuch

Laws applied
- Voting Rights Act of 1965

Allen v. Milligan, 599 U.S. 1 (2023), (Note: The case was titled Merrill v. Milligan until Wes Allen replaced John Merrill as Alabama Secretary of State. However, the case was argued as Merrill v. Milligan, No. 21- 1086 at oral argument before the court.) is a United States Supreme Court case related to redistricting under the Voting Rights Act of 1965 (VRA). The appellees and respondents argued that Alabama's congressional districts drawn after the 2020 census discriminated against African-American voters by having only one majority-minority district. The Court ruled 5–4 that Alabama's districts likely violated the VRA, and maintained an injunction that required Alabama to create an additional majority-minority district.

On remand to the state, the legislature passed a new map in 2023 that still had only one majority-minority district while increasing the minority representation in another. This map was challenged, and a lower federal court ruled it still violated the VRA, placing an injunction on the use of the map. The injunction was upheld by the Supreme Court. However, in the wake of the Supreme Court's decision in Louisiana v. Callais in 2026, which significantly weakened the use of the VRA in assessing racial gerrymandering, the state was able to gain a stay of the injunction on the 2023 maps from the Supreme Court to use for the 2026 general election.

== Background ==
Alabama's congressional districts have had roughly the same configuration since 1993, with one majority-minority district out of its seven total districts. Data from the 2020 United States census showed that while the state did not gain or lose any representation at the federal level, the racial diversity in the state had increased, with the portion of white residents having fallen from 68% to 64% over the prior ten years, while Alabama's Black population grew by 3.8 percent over the same period.

In November 2021, the Alabama Legislature modified the existing districts to account for shifts in population. Soon after, multiple groups of plaintiffs sued, asserting the districts violated Section 2 of the Voting Rights Act of 1965 and the Fourteenth Amendment to the United States Constitution. The plaintiffs sought the creation of an additional majority-minority district. Two suits (Singleton and Milligan) were assigned to a three-judge district court consisting of Judges Stanley Marcus, Terry F. Moorer, and Anna M. Manasco, and the third suit (Caster) was assigned to just Manasco. On January 24, 2022, the district courts in each of the cases enjoined the districts, holding they violated the VRA. The judges issued an order that Alabama must redraw its maps, such that "any remedial plan will need to include two districts in which Black voters either comprise a voting-age majority or something quite close to it." The courts did not decide the constitutional issue, applying the doctrine of constitutional avoidance. Alabama appealed the following day to the Supreme Court in Milligan and the United States Court of Appeals for the Eleventh Circuit in Caster.

== Supreme Court ==
=== Initial injunction ===
The Supreme Court stayed the district court's injunctions in an order issued on February 7, 2022. The order stated that there was probable jurisdiction from the district court's order in Milligan, and granted certiorari before judgment in Caster. Justice Elena Kagan, joined by Justices Stephen Breyer and Sonia Sotomayor dissented, stating "Today's decision is one more in a disconcertingly long line of cases in which this Court uses its shadow docket to signal or make changes in the law, without anything approaching full briefing and argument." Chief Justice John Roberts also wrote a dissent to the order to grant a stay, but agreed the Court should review the case.

In response to Kagan's dissent, Justice Brett Kavanaugh wrote a concurrence, joined by Justice Samuel Alito, stating that under Purcell v. Gonzalez, courts should not enjoin enforcement of election-related laws or regulations so close to the election. Again in response, Kagan noted that Alabama "enacted the current map in less than a week and can move quickly again if it wants to", and that their "primary is still four months away, while the general election is nearly nine months away." By contrast, Purcell was decided only 15 days before the 2006 election.

=== Oral argument ===
Oral arguments were held on October 4, 2022, with Edmund LaCour defending Alabama, Deuel Ross of the NAACP Legal Defense Fund for the Milligan appellees, Abha Khanna of Elias Law Group for the Caster respondents, and the United States solicitor general Elizabeth Prelogar as amicus curiae for the United States.

=== Opinion of the Court ===
On June 8, 2023, the Supreme Court affirmed the district court and held Alabama's map likely violated the Voting Rights Act. Chief Justice John Roberts delivered the opinion of the court, except for Part III-B-1. His opinion was joined in whole by Justices Sonia Sotomayor, Elena Kagan, and Ketanji Brown Jackson, and in part by Justice Brett Kavanaugh.

=== Dissents ===
Justice Clarence Thomas wrote a dissent, joined fully by Justice Gorsuch and partially by Justice Alito and Justice Barrett. Thomas wrote that the decision would force "Alabama to intentionally redraw its longstanding congressional districts so that black voters can control a number of seats roughly proportional to the black share of the State's population. Section 2 demands no such thing, and, if it did, the Constitution would not permit it." Justice Alito wrote a separate dissent joined fully by Justice Gorsuch.

=== Aftermath and 2026 stay of proceedings ===
The new congressional districts map chosen by the district court

On June 12, 2023, the Supreme Court formally lifted their stay on the district court's decision. On June 15, the Alabama Attorney General's office informed the District Court for the Northern District of Alabama that the Legislature would draft and pass a new congressional district map by July 21 in a special session. The defendants had previously asserted that any map must be in place by October 1, a month prior to Alabama's candidate filing deadline on November 10 for the 2024 general elections.

By July 2023, the Alabama legislature created a new redistricting map that had only one black-majority district, while raising the proportion of blacks of voting age in a second district. This map was approved by Alabama Governor Kay Ivey on July 21, 2023. Democratic lawmakers in the state criticized the map for failing to meet the two black-majority district requirement set by the prior litigation. Ivey stated "The Legislature knows our state, our people, and our districts better than the federal courts or activist groups, and I am pleased that they answered the call, remained focused, and produced new districts ahead of the court deadline." The new map had to be approved by the district court. The district court rejected the new maps on September 5, 2023, ruling that they were "deeply troubled" by the legislature's failure to follow the court order, and assigned a special master to redraw new districts. The special master submitted three options for redistricting that included the required two black-majority districts by September 25, 2023, to be reviewed by the three-judge panel. The judges' panel selected one of these for their approval on October 5, 2023.

State attorney general Steve Marshall had filed for an emergency stay of the rejection of the legislature's revised maps to the U.S. Supreme Court, but the Court denied the request on September 26, 2023. Marshall then dismissed the state's remaining appeal to the Supreme Court against the district court's order on September 29, while the state's lawyers argued to the district court that the special master's proposed maps were racial gerrymanders.

A three judge panel of the Northern District of Alabama ruled in May 2025 that the congressional district maps produced by the legislature in 2023 violated both the VRA and 14th Amendment, and may not be used for any future elections.

On April 28, 2026, the Supreme Court ruled in Louisiana v. Callais that the creation of two majority-Black districts in Louisiana based on Section 2 of the VRA violated the Equal Protection Clause of the Fourteenth and Fifteenth Amendments to the Constitution. The day after, Alabama filed an emergency motion with the Supreme Court to lift the stay on the legislature's maps based on the Callais decision, despite the fact that early voting had already begun for the state's primaries. Simultaneously, governor Kay Ivey called a special session of the legislature on May 1, 2026, to begin crafting a new redistricting map compliant with Callais.

On May 11, 2026, the Supreme Court in a brief unsigned shadow docket order vacated 3 lower court judgments and remanded the cases in light of Callais. Justice Sotomayor dissented, joined by Justices Kagan and Jackson. Sotomayor wrote:

the District Court held, in one of the three cases before this Court, that Alabama violated the Fourteenth Amendment by intentionally diluting the votes of Black voters in Alabama. That constitutional finding of intentional discrimination is independent of, and unaffected by, any of the legal issues discussed in Callais. Vacatur is thus inappropriate and will cause only confusion as Alabamians begin to vote in the elections scheduled for next week (...) In short, the record showed that Alabama made an intentional choice to perpetuate and entrench, rather than remedy and uproot, the racial discrimination that the District Court had previously found and that this Court had affirmed. (...) Even if Callais had something to say about the evidence necessary to establish discriminatory intent, it still would not be appropriate to vacate the decision below at this time. That is because Alabama’s congressional primary election is next week, and vacating the District Court’s injunction will immediately replace the current map with Alabama’s 2023 Redistricting Plan until the District Court acts, even though voting has already begun. Vacatur is an equitable remedy, and the Court should not lightly wield it to unleash chaos and to confuse voters. (...) As with all vacaturs of this kind from this Court, the District Court remains free on remand to decide for itself whether Callais has any bearing on its Fourteenth Amendment analysis or if its prior reasoning is unaffected by that decision.

Sotomayor also wrote, "Callais also insisted that this Court’s prior decision in Allen remains good law. These cases are, of course, Allen. So if Allen is good law anywhere, then it must be good law here."

On May 26, 2026, the Northern Alabama federal district panel consisting of Judges Anna M. Manasco, Terry F. Moorer and Stanley Marcus again blocked the 2023 map from being used as an unconstitutional racial gerrymander. The decision said "We cannot see our way clear to requiring Alabamians to cast their votes in the 2026 elections under a districting plan tainted by intentional race-based discrimination." The state requested an emergency stay on this order to the Supreme Court, which it granted on June 2, 2026, over dissents from Sotomayor, Kagan, and Jackson. The unsigned order said the court failed to fully consider the map in light of Callais, as well as acting too close to the election under the Purcell principle. The order stated "Here, the District Court interposed itself into Alabama’s ongoing efforts to conduct its imminent 2026 congressional elections under maps that its elected representatives selected. Its view that conducting the elections under court-imposed maps would be more convenient for the State was not a valid justification for that intervention." Sotomayor wrote in the dissent that the majority's decision "disregards both democratic values and the rule of law".

== Related cases ==
=== Alabama ===
A court case, Thomas v. Allen, challenging the Alabama Senate district maps under Section 2 of the VRA and challenging both legislative chambers' district maps under the Fourteenth Amendment, was filed on November 16, 2021. Litigation was paused pending the outcome of Milligan.

=== Louisiana ===
==== Congressional district case ====
In Louisiana, the 2020 Census reported that African Americans made up about 30% of the state, but the new district map, drawn by the Republican-controlled state legislature, only provided for one majority-Black district out of the six allocated to the state. This map was challenged by black voters, claiming violation of the VRA. The federal district ruled the new maps were violations of the VRA, placing an injunction on those maps and ordered new maps to be drawn. The Fifth Circuit did not grant motion, leading the state to appeal to the Supreme Court. The Supreme Court, in June 2022, granted certiorari and stayed the district court's order pending the results of Allen. Once Allen was decided in June 2023, the Supreme Court lifted its stay, remanding the case back to the Fifth Circuit. There, the Fifth Circuit ordered the Louisiana state legislature to draw a map with two majority-Black districts in time for the 2024 elections, or they would send it back to the district court to draw the map there. The state legislature, through special sessions, completed a new two majority-Black district map by January 2025. Governor Landry signed the map into law on January 22.

A group of "non-black voters" challenged the new map, leading to Louisiana v. Callais, claiming that the creation of a second majority-Black district violated their rights under the Equal Protection Clause and the Fourteenth and Fifteenth Amendment. A three judge panel of the District Court for the Western District of Louisiana ruled 2-1 that the new map was racially gerrymandered and violated the constitutional rights of the plaintiffs, and blocked use of the new map in May 2024. The state requested an emergency stay from the Supreme Court, as it was too close to the 2024 election to draw new maps, which the Supreme Court granted, allowing the new 2025 maps to be used for that election cycle while litigation continued. Both the state and black voters challenged the district court's findings to the Supreme Court, which granted certaorari. The Court first heard the case in March 2025, but in an unusual move, requested a second oral session held October 2025, with request for the parties and amici to focus on the Fourteenth and Fifteenth Amendment aspects. Further, with the second oral session, the state of Louisiana told the court it was no longer defending the January 2025 map and instead supported the arguments on being racially gerrymanders; this came admist a push for mid-decade redistricting in 2025 by president Donald Trump as to hold Republican control of the U.S. House of Representatives. The court issued its decision on April 29, 2026, ruling that the creation of majority-minority districts under the VRA was unconstitutional, and significantly limited the applicability of the VRA to bring claims of racial gerrymandering to the courts.

==== Other cases ====
In addition, other active cases filed against Louisiana targeted the state legislative and Louisiana Supreme Court maps under Section 2 of the VRA. The case challenging the district map of the State Supreme Court, Chisom v. Louisiana, has been active since 1986, and resulted in a 1992 consent decree in which the district map would not violate Section 2. The state filed a petition to dissolve the consent decree in 2021 but was rejected by a district court, after which the state appealed to the 5th Circuit, which held oral arguments in March 2023.

=== Georgia ===
Several lawsuits were filed against Georgia to challenge congressional and state legislative maps under Section 2. The congressional map cases largely argue for another minority-opportunity district in the Metro Atlanta region. The Northern District ruled in October 2023 that the Georgia legislature must redraw the congressional and legislative maps to support the minority-opportunity district in Metro Atlanta by December 9, 2023, or else the court will draw such maps. The same day, a special session was called by Governor Brian Kemp for November 28, 2023 to redraw the maps.

In addition, a lawsuit, Rose v. Raffensperger, was filed against the at-large election method used for electing members of the Georgia Public Service Commission under Section 2. The Northern District ruled in favor of the plaintiffs, ordering that the elections for two seats on the GAPSC be postponed until the election method is changed. An appeal was filed by the state to the 11th Circuit, where litigation continues; an emergency stay of the Northern District's order was granted by the 11th Circuit but was then vacated by the U.S. Supreme Court in August 2022.

=== Other states ===
At the time of the decision, several other federal court cases across 10 states, including South Carolina and Texas, argued against congressional, legislative, and other district maps as violating Section 2. Stays were issued in several of these cases prior to the Milligan decision.
