= Ecological correlation =

Correlation between two variables that are group means

In statistics, an ecological correlation (also spatial correlation) is a correlation between two variables that are group means, in contrast to a correlation between two variables that describe individuals. For example, one might study the correlation between physical activity and weight among sixth-grade children. A study at the individual level might make use of 100 children, then measure both physical activity and weight; the correlation between the two variables would be at the individual level. By contrast, another study might make use of 100 classes of sixth-grade students, then measure the mean physical activity and the mean weight of each of the 100 classes. A correlation between these group means would be an example of an ecological correlation.

Because a correlation describes the measured strength of a relationship, correlations at the group level can be much higher than those at the individual level. Thinking both are equal is an example of ecological fallacy.

== See also ==
General topics

- Ecological regression
- Geographic information science
- Spatial autocorrelation
- Complete spatial randomness
- Modifiable areal unit problem

Specific applications

- Spatial epidemiology
- Spatial econometrics
