= Elias Law Group =

American law firm

Elias Law Group LLP
- No. of offices: 2
- No. of attorneys: 100+
- Major practice areas: General corporate practice, litigation, regulatory
- Date founded: 2021
- Company type: Limited liability partnership
- Website: www.elias.law

Elias Law Group is an American law firm founded by Democratic election lawyer Marc Elias. The firm is headquartered in Washington, D.C., with additional offices in Seattle, Washington. Elias Law Group describes itself as "a mission-driven firm committed to helping Democrats win, citizens vote, and progressives make change."

In a 2021 interview with The New Yorker, Elias said the firm "represents only clients who meet at least one of three criteria: they must be Democrats or an organization that helps Democrats win elections; they are bringing cases that challenge laws that restrict voting; or they are a progressive group that meets the values of our firm."

Chambers and Partners, a legal research company, described Elias Law Group as "a political law boutique boasting a deep bench of experienced practitioners able to advise on complex election law matters. The firm offers particular prowess in voting rights and redistricting litigation and is well placed to assist Democratic campaigns and institutions, as well as nonprofit organizations."

In 2022, Politico reported that Elias Law Group represented 950 clients, including more than 150 Democratic House and Senate campaigns and Members of Congress.

== History ==
Elias Law Group was founded on September 2, 2021, with 15 partners and 50 total lawyers.

On October 4, 2022, Elias Law Group partner Abha Khanna argued on behalf of the Caster respondents in Allen v. Milligan, a landmark United States Supreme Court case related to redistricting under the Voting Rights Act of 1965 (VRA). In a 5–4 decision, the Court ruled that Alabama's districts likely violated the VRA, maintained an injunction that required Alabama to create an additional majority-minority district, and held that Section 2 of the VRA is constitutional in the redistricting context.

In November 2022, Elias Law Group represented U.S. Senator Raphael Warnock during the runoff election, winning a lawsuit that allowed counties to offer early voting on the Saturday before Thanksgiving.

Following the 2022 midterm election in Arizona, Elias Law Group represented Governor Katie Hobbs after defeated Republican candidate Kari Lake contested the election results.

In January 2025, four attorneys quit the firm after Elias Law Group required employees to sign mandatory arbitration agreements and nondisclosure agreements. The arbitration agreement requires lawyers and staff to waive their rights to bring class actions against the firm. According to Bloomberg Law, "Some lawmakers have sought to ban forced arbitration and curb the use of nondisclosure pacts, arguing the deals help shield corporations from liability for wrongdoing and silence victims." After the new requirement was first announced, 42 attorneys at the firm signed a letter warning that forced arbitration as a condition of employment makes the firm "appear out of step with Democratic Party values."

=== Targeting of Elias and the Elias Law Group by the Trump administration ===
On March 22, 2025, President Donald Trump issued a presidential memorandum, "Preventing Abuses of the Legal System and the Federal Court", targeting lawyers and law firms more generally if they filed "frivolous, unreasonable, and vexatious litigation" against the administration, as judged by the attorney general. A variety of people in the legal profession condemned the memorandum as an attempt to intimidate firms so that they wouldn't take on clients who oppose government actions.

In the memorandum, Trump specifically mentioned the Marc Elias and the Elias Law Group LLP as being "deeply involved in the creation of a false 'dossier' by a foreign national designed to provide a fraudulent basis for Federal law enforcement to investigate a Presidential candidate in order to alter the outcome of the Presidential election" and that "Elias also intentionally sought to conceal the role of his client — failed Presidential candidate Hillary Clinton — in the dossier." Marc Elias spoke openly in opposition to such actions by stating: "President Trump's goal is clear...[h]e wants lawyers and law firms to capitulate and cower until there is no one left to oppose his Administration in court...Elias Law Group will not be deterred from fighting for democracy in court...There will be no negotiation with this White House about the clients we represent or the lawsuits we bring on their behalf."
