= Purcell principle =

U.S. election law doctrine

In United States law, the Purcell principle is the doctrine that courts should not change election rules too close to an election, because of the risk of causing confusion. It is named after Purcell v. Gonzalez, a 2006 case from the U.S. Supreme Court's emergency docket, or shadow docket. It is frequently invoked by the Supreme Court and lower courts to allow elections to proceed under a state's preferred voting requirements, maps, and other rules. Parameters for what constitutes an applicable change in election rules or when is too close to an election have never been laid out, an ambiguity that allows the Supreme Court to invoke it selectively.

The term "Purcell principle" was introduced in a 2016 law review article by Richard L. Hasen. It has also since appeared in opinions by the justices themselves.

== Purcell v. Gonzalez ==
Purcell v. Gonzalez (2006) was a case where the U.S. Supreme Court vacated a lower court's order that had blocked an Arizona voter ID law during the 2006 midterm election. Plaintiffs challenged Arizona's voting rules in federal court. Initially, the district court denied the plaintiffs' request for a preliminary injunction. The plaintiffs appealed, and the U.S. Court of Appeals for the Ninth Circuit granted an injunction pending appeal. The appeal was scheduled to be decided after the election. As a result, the Ninth Circuit's October temporary order had the effect of changing the rules for the November election.

The Supreme Court held that the Ninth Circuit, whose order contained no explanation, had not given the required deference to the district court's discretion. The Supreme Court also wrote that the election was imminent and the state needed clear guidance. The court explained that many considerations, general and election-specific, had to be weighed. One such consideration was that "court orders affecting elections, especially conflicting orders, can themselves result in voter confusion and consequent incentive to remain away from the polls. As an election draws closer, that risk will increase." These ideas about orders issued close to an election formed the basis for the Purcell principle.

== Relationship with traditional stay factors ==
It is unclear how Purcell relates to the usual standards of review for emergency relief. Purcell v. Gonzalez itself stated that "considerations specific to election cases" should be weighed "in addition to" the harms of granting or not granting an injunction.

Normally, a court deciding on an application for a stay considers four traditional factors: "(1) whether the stay applicant has made a strong showing that he is likely to succeed on the merits; (2) whether the applicant will be irreparably injured absent a stay; (3) whether issuance of the stay will substantially injure the other parties interested in the proceeding; and (4) where the public interest lies. ... The first two factors of the traditional standard are the most critical." Different formulations apply to different forms of emergency relief—granting stays, vacating stays, issuing interlocutory injunctions—but all involve the likelihood of success on the merits, irreparable harm, and public interest.

In a dissent in a 2014 case, Justice Ginsburg argued that "Purcell held only that courts must take careful account of considerations specific to election cases, not that election cases are exempt from traditional stay standards". Ginsburg, joined by Justices Sotomayor and Kagan, thought that the court of appeals in that case had overemphasized Purcell and failed to properly apply the established standards, such as likelihood of success on the merits.

In a 2022 grant of a stay in Merrill v. Milligan, Justice Kavanaugh wrote a concurring opinion, joined by Justice Alito, stating that the "traditional test for a stay does not apply (at least not in the same way)" when the Purcell principle is in play. Kavanaugh suggested a set of heightened criteria that he believed are necessary for plaintiffs to overcome the Purcell principle.

Law professor Richard L. Hasen argued that the Purcell principle should be part of the public interest factor of the traditional multi-factor standard, and not a stand-alone rule. University of Texas law professor Steve Vladeck found it "troubling" that "by departing from the traditional standard, Purcell removes from the equation the possibility that, as disruptive as an injunction might be, freezing (or not issuing) it would be worse."

== Late-breaking changes by the Supreme Court itself ==
Under the Purcell principle, lower courts should not intervene and change election rules close to an election. If the lower court does intervene, the Supreme Court should correct the lower court's error, even though the Supreme Court's action is also close to the election. In Republican National Committee v. Democratic National Committee (2020), the Supreme Court cited Purcell in granting a stay of the district court's order which extended the deadline for absentee ballots. The four-justice dissent also cited Purcell, instead arguing that the Supreme Court's own intervention was even closer to the election and an even less appropriate change to the status quo. In a 6-3 decision in Louisiana v. Callais (2026), the Supreme Court did not mention Purcell in its ruling, which allowed the state to cancel an ongoing primary election and draw new districts for the 2026 congressional midterms. The three-justice dissent highlighted that the Supreme Court itself invoked Purcell months earlier regarding the same midterm elections in order to prevent a lower court from declaring new congressional maps in Texas to be an unconstitutional racial gerrymander. Also in 2026, the Supreme Court allowed Alabama in Allen v. Milligan to invalidate its own primary results in several congressional districts to allow the state to revert to a district map passed by the legislature in 2023, which had been superseded by a court-drawn map for the 2024 elections.
