= Ecological fallacy =

Formal fallacy in statistical interpretation

An ecological fallacy (also ecological inference fallacy or population fallacy) is a formal fallacy in the interpretation of statistical data that occurs when inferences about the nature of individuals are deduced from inferences about the group to which those individuals belong. "Ecological fallacy" is a term that is sometimes used to describe the fallacy of division, which is not a statistical fallacy. The four common statistical ecological fallacies are: confusion between ecological correlations and individual correlations, confusion between group average and total average, Simpson's paradox, and confusion between higher average and higher likelihood. From a statistical point of view, these ideas can be unified by specifying proper statistical models to make formal inferences, using aggregate data to make unobserved relationships in individual level data.

== Examples ==
=== Mean and median ===
An example of ecological fallacy is the assumption that a population mean has a simple interpretation when considering likelihoods for an individual.

For instance, if the mean score of a group is larger than zero, this does not imply that a random individual of that group is more likely to have a positive score than a negative one (as long as there are more negative scores than positive scores an individual is more likely to have a negative score). Similarly, if a particular group of people is measured to have a lower mean IQ than the general population, it is an error to conclude that a randomly-selected member of the group is more likely than not to have a lower IQ than the mean IQ of the general population; it is also not necessarily the case that a randomly selected member of the group is more likely than not to have a lower IQ than a randomly-selected member of the general population. Mathematically, this comes from the fact that a distribution can have a positive mean but a negative median. This property is linked to the skewness of the distribution.

Consider the following numerical example:

- Group A: 80% of people got 40 points and 20% of them got 95 points. The mean score is 51 points.
- Group B: 50% of people got 45 points and 50% got 55 points. The mean score is 50 points.
- If we pick two people at random from A and B, there are 4 possible outcomes:
  - A – 40, B – 45 (B wins, 40% probability – 0.8 × 0.5)
  - A – 40, B – 55 (B wins, 40% probability – 0.8 × 0.5)
  - A – 95, B – 45 (A wins, 10% probability – 0.2 × 0.5)
  - A – 95, B – 55 (A wins, 10% probability – 0.2 × 0.5)
- Although Group A has a higher mean score, 80% of the time a random individual of A will score lower than a random individual of B.

=== Individual and aggregate correlations ===
Research dating back to Émile Durkheim suggests that predominantly Protestant localities have higher suicide rates than predominantly Catholic localities. According to Freedman, the idea that Durkheim's findings link, at an individual level, a person's religion to their suicide risk is an example of the ecological fallacy. A group-level relationship does not automatically characterize the relationship at the level of the individual.

Similarly, even if at the individual level, wealth is positively correlated with the tendency to vote Republican in the United States, we observe that wealthier states tend to vote Democratic. For example, in the 2004 United States presidential election, the Republican candidate, George W. Bush, won the fifteen poorest states, and the Democratic candidate, John Kerry, won 9 of the 11 wealthiest states in the Electoral College. Yet 62% of voters with annual incomes over $200,000 voted for Bush, but only 36% of voters with annual incomes of $15,000 or less voted for Bush. Aggregate-level correlation will differ from individual-level correlation if voting preferences are affected by the total wealth of the state even after controlling for individual wealth. The true driving factor in voting preference could be self-perceived relative wealth; perhaps those who see themselves as better off than their neighbours are more likely to vote Republican. In this case, an individual would be more likely to vote Republican if they became wealthier, but they would be more likely to vote for a Democrat if their neighbor's wealth increased (resulting in a wealthier state).

However, the observed difference in voting habits based on state- and individual-level wealth could also be explained by the common confusion between higher averages and higher likelihoods as discussed above. States may not be wealthier because they contain more wealthy people (i.e., more people with annual incomes over $200,000), but rather because they contain a small number of super-rich individuals; the ecological fallacy then results from incorrectly assuming that individuals in wealthier states are more likely to be wealthy.

Many examples of ecological fallacies can be found in studies of social networks, which often combine analysis and implications from different levels. This has been illustrated in an academic paper on networks of farmers in Sumatra.

=== Robinson's paradox ===
A 1950 paper by William S. Robinson computed the illiteracy rate and the proportion of the population born outside the US for each state and for the District of Columbia, as of the 1930 census. He showed that these two figures were associated with a negative correlation of −0.53; in other words, the greater the proportion of immigrants in a state, the lower its average illiteracy (or, equivalently, the higher its average literacy). However, when individuals are considered, the correlation between illiteracy and nativity was +0.12 (immigrants were on average more literate than native citizens although the ecological correlation shows the opposite). Robinson showed that the negative correlation at the level of state populations was because immigrants tended to settle in states where the native population was more literate. He cautioned against deducing conclusions about individuals on the basis of population-level, or "ecological" data. In 2011, it was found that Robinson's calculations of the ecological correlations are based on the wrong state level data. The correlation of −0.53 mentioned above is in fact −0.46. Robinson's paper was seminal, but the term 'ecological fallacy' was not coined until 1958 by Selvin.

=== Formal problem ===
The correlation of aggregate quantities (or ecological correlation) is not equal to the correlation of individual quantities. Denote by X_{i}, Y_{i} two quantities at the individual level. The formula for the covariance of the aggregate quantities in groups of size N is given by Bienaymé's identity:

$$\operatorname{cov}\left( \sum_{i=1}^N Y_i, \sum_{i=1}^N X_i\right)= \sum_{i=1}^{N} \operatorname{cov}(Y_{i},X_i)+ \sum_{i=1}^N \sum_{l\neq i} \operatorname{cov}(Y_l,X_i)$$

The covariance of two aggregated variables depends not only on the covariance of two variables within the same individuals but also on covariances of the variables between different individuals. In other words, correlation of aggregate variables take into account cross sectional effects which are not relevant at the individual level.

The problem for correlations entails naturally a problem for regressions on aggregate variables: the correlation fallacy is therefore an important issue for a researcher who wants to measure causal impacts. Start with a regression model where the outcome $Y_i$ is impacted by $X_i$

$$Y_i=\alpha+\beta X_i+u_i,$$
$$\operatorname{cov}[u_i,X_i]=0.$$

The regression model at the aggregate level is obtained by summing the individual equations:

$$\sum_{i=1}^N Y_i=\alpha\cdot N+ \beta \sum_{i=1}^N X_i+ \sum_{i=1}^N u_i,$$
$$\operatorname{cov}\left[\sum_{i=1}^N u_i,\sum_{i=1}^{N} X_i\right]\neq 0.$$

Nothing prevents the regressors and the errors from being correlated at the aggregate level. Therefore, generally, running a regression on aggregate data does not estimate the same model than running a regression with individual data.

The aggregate model is correct if and only if

$$\operatorname{cov}\left[u_i,\sum_{k=1}^{N} X_k\right]= 0 \quad \text{ for all } i.$$

This means that, controlling for $X_i$, $\sum_{k=1}^{N} X_k$ does not determine $Y_i$.

=== Choosing between aggregate and individual inference ===
Running regressions on aggregate data can yield valid (unbiased, under the usual identification assumptions) estimates when the target of inference is the aggregate model. For example, for state-level policy analysis, estimating the relationship between police force and crime using state-level data is appropriate for assessing the effect of a statewide change in police staffing. By contrast, inferring city-level impacts from state-level associations constitutes an ecological fallacy, since parameters estimated at the aggregate level need not identify effects at finer geographic units.

Choosing to run aggregate or individual regressions to understand aggregate impacts on some policy depends on the following trade-off: aggregate regressions lose individual-level data but individual regressions add strong modeling assumptions. Some researchers suggest that the ecological correlation gives a better picture of the outcome of public policy actions, thus they recommend the ecological correlation over the individual level correlation for this purpose. Other researchers disagree, especially when the relationships among the levels are not clearly modeled. To prevent ecological fallacy, researchers with no individual data can model first what is occurring at the individual level, then model how the individual and group levels are related, and finally examine whether anything occurring at the group level adds to the understanding of the relationship. For instance, in evaluating the impact of state policies, it is helpful to know that policy impacts vary less among the states than do the policies themselves, suggesting that the policy differences are not well translated into results, despite high ecological correlations.

== Group and total averages ==
Ecological fallacy can also refer to the following fallacy: the average for a group is approximated by the average in the total population divided by the group size. Suppose one knows the number of Protestants and the suicide rate in the US, but one does not have data linking religion and suicide at the individual level. If one is interested in the suicide rate of Protestants, it is a mistake to estimate it by the total suicide rate divided by the number of Protestants. Formally, denote $P[\text{Suicide}\mid\text{Protestant}]$ the mean of the group, we generally have:

$$P[\text{Suicide}\mid\text{Protestant}] \neq \frac{P[\text{Suicide}]}{P(\text{Protestant})}$$

However, the law of total probability gives

$$\begin{align}
P[\text{Suicide}]= {\color{Blue}P[\text{Suicide}\mid\text{Protestant}]} P(\text{Protestant})+ {\color{Blue}P[\text{Suicide}\mid\text{not Protestant}]}(1-P(\text{Protestant}))
\end{align}$$

As we know that $P[\text{Suicide}\mid\text{not Protestant}]$ is between 0 and 1, this equation gives a bound for $P[\text{Suicide}\mid\text{Protestant}]$.

== Simpson's paradox ==
Simpson's paradox is an ecological fallacy: when comparing two populations divided into groups, the average of some variable in the first population can be higher in every group and yet lower in the total population. Formally, when each value of Z refers to a different group and X refers to some treatment, it can happen that

$$E[Y\mid Z=z, X=1]> E[Y\mid Z=z,X=0] \ \text{for all } z, \text{ while } 	E[Y\mid X=1]< E[Y\mid X=0]$$

When $E[Y\mid Z=z, X=1]-E[Y\mid Z=z,X=0]$ does not depend on $Z$, the Simpson's paradox is exactly the omitted variable bias for the regression of Y on X where the regressor $X$ is a dummy variable and the omitted variable $Z$ is a categorical variable defining groups for each value it takes. The bias can be high enough for conditional and unconditional effects to have opposite signs.

== Legal applications ==
The ecological fallacy was discussed in a court challenge to the 2004 Washington gubernatorial election in which a number of illegal voters were identified, after the election; their votes were unknown, because the vote was by secret ballot. The challengers argued that illegal votes cast in the election would have followed the voting patterns of the precincts in which they had been cast, and thus adjustments should be made accordingly. An expert witness said this approach was like trying to figure out Ichiro Suzuki's batting average by looking at the batting average of the entire Seattle Mariners team, since the illegal votes were cast by an unrepresentative sample of each precinct's voters, and might be as different from the average voter in the precinct as Ichiro was from the rest of his team. The judge determined that the challengers' argument was an ecological fallacy and rejected it.

== See also ==
- List of fallacies
- Correlation fallacy
- Complete spatial randomness
- Ecological regression
- Misuse of statistics
- Modifiable areal unit problem
- Spatial autocorrelation
- Spatial epidemiology
- Spatial econometrics
- Statistical discrimination
- Uncertain geographic context problem
