= Abha Khanna =

American attorney

- Education: Berkeley College, Yale University; Yale Law School
- Occupation: Attorney
- Known for: Redistricting law

Abha Khanna is an American attorney specializing in redistricting law and voting rights. She successfully argued Allen v. Milligan before the United States Supreme Court which focused on racial gerrymandering in the state of Alabama.

== Early life and education ==
Khanna grew up in northern New Jersey and graduated from West Milford High School. Her parents immigrated from India and Khanna recalls attending her parent's naturalization ceremony as a child. She graduated summa cum laude from Berkeley College at Yale University with a major in psychology. After graduating, Khanna taught English and planned to pursue a PhD in English literature but decided to go to law school instead. She graduated from Yale Law School in 2007.

== Career ==
Khanna started as an associate attorney at Perkins Coie in 2010. While working at Perkins, she gained experience in redistricting law, including working a case that challenged the city council of Yakima, Washington under the Voting Rights Act; the case was successful, leading to three Latinas being elected to city council the next year. She later became a partner at Elias Law Group.

In 2022, Khanna was a lead plaintiff in Allen v. Milligan, a Supreme Court case that argued Alabama's redrawn congressional districts discriminated against African-American voters. The Supreme Court ruled in favor of Khanna and the plaintiffs, upholding Section 2 of the Voting Rights Act. In follow-up remedial hearings on Alabama's electoral maps, Khanna has commented that "the need for Section 2 is greater than ever" and warned that voting protections could become completely suppressed.

In 2026, Khanna pushed back against the passing of the Florida SAVE Act, stating that requiring proof of citizenship to register to vote violates the Fourteenth Amendment to the United States Constitution.

== Awards and honors ==
In 2001, Khanna was the recipient of the Arthur Twining Hadley Prize in recognition of her "exceptional performance and promise of future success".

In 2024, Khanna was the keynote speaker at Samford University's Cumberland School of Law Black Law Students Association's 30th Annual Thurgood Marshall Symposium.
