= Louisiana v. Callais =

2026 U.S. Supreme Court case on racial gerrymandering

Louisiana v. Callais Robinson v. Callais
- Supreme Court of the United States

Argued March 24, 2025 Reargued October 15, 2025 Decided April 29, 2026
- Full case name: Louisiana, Appellant v. Phillip Callais, et al. Press Robinson, et al., Appellants v. Phillip Callais, et al.
- Docket nos.: 24-109; 24-110
- Citations: 608 U.S. ___ (more)
- Reargument: Reargument
- Decision: Opinion

Holding
- Compliance with the Voting Rights Act did not require Louisiana to use race as the basis for redistricting. No compelling State interest justified the use of race in creating SB8, and that map is an unconstitutional racial gerrymander.

Court membership
- Chief Justice John Roberts Associate Justices Clarence Thomas · Samuel Alito; Sonia Sotomayor · Elena Kagan; Neil Gorsuch · Brett Kavanaugh; Amy Coney Barrett · Ketanji Brown Jackson

Case opinions
- Majority: Alito, joined by Roberts, Thomas, Gorsuch, Kavanaugh, Barrett
- Concurrence: Thomas, joined by Gorsuch
- Dissent: Kagan, joined by Sotomayor, Jackson

Laws applied
- Voting Rights Act of 1965; U.S. Const. amend. XIV, XV

Louisiana v. Callais, consolidated with Robinson v. Callais, 608 U.S. ___ (2026), is a landmark decision of the Supreme Court of the United States concerning racial gerrymandering and redistricting in the state of Louisiana following the 2020 United States census. After the Supreme Court's decision in Allen v. Milligan, the Louisiana legislature produced a new map under court orders, allocating two of the state's six districts as majority-minority districts using the state's 2020 census demographics and in compliance with Section 2 of the Voting Rights Act. The new maps were challenged as racially-gerrymandered and a constitutional violation of the Fourteenth and Fifteenth Amendments. In a 6–3 decision, the Court ruled along ideological lines that affirmed the federal district panel's judgement that the new redistricting map was an unconstitutional racial gerrymander under the Fifteenth Amendment.

While the Court declined to find Section 2 of the Voting Rights Act unconstitutional, it established additional requirements for vote dilution claims to succeed, beyond the ones set out in Thornburg v. Gingles (1986). Justice Samuel Alito, writing for the majority, held that plaintiffs in Section 2 challenges must demonstrate that a state intentionally redistricted to diminish the opportunity for minority voters, by the plaintiffs offering their own, alternative maps that meet the state's legitimate goals while correcting the minority vote. Absent such proof, the Court indicated that such challenges would be deemed not an illegal gerrymander, under the precedent of Rucho v. Common Cause (2019).

== Background ==
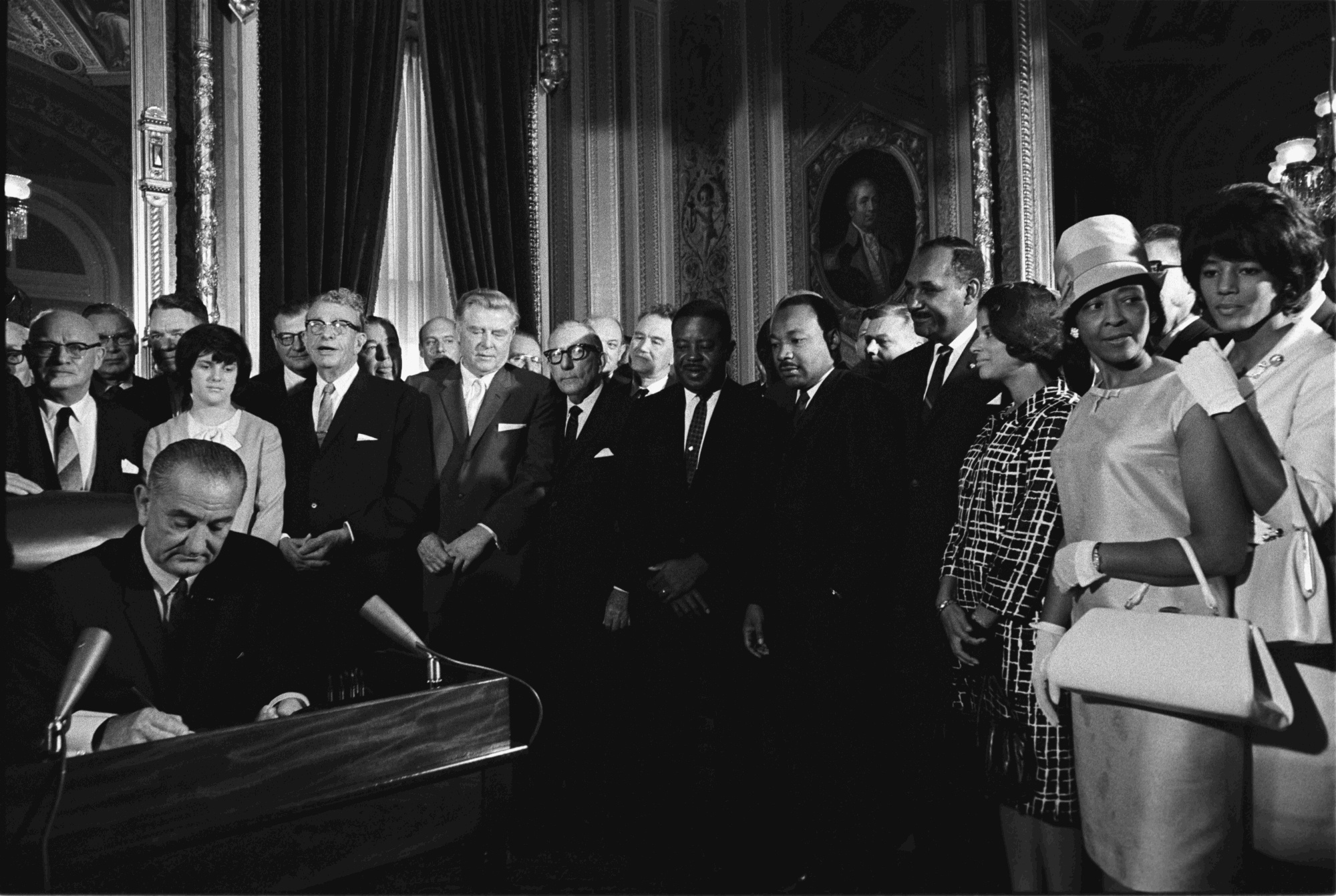
President Lyndon B. Johnson signs the Voting Rights Act in 1965.

=== Voting Rights Act of 1965 and redistricting ===
The Voting Rights Act of 1965 (VRA) was signed into law under Lyndon B. Johnson. Prior to that, many of the southern United States had Jim Crow laws that promoted racial segregation despite the guarantees of the Fourteenth and Fifteenth Amendment to the United States Constitution, particularly limiting the ability of Black Americans to vote with poll taxes. After organized protests, including the Selma to Montgomery marches in 1965, Johnson urged Congress to pass laws to assure that minorities had the right to vote, leading to the passage of the VRA and other civil rights laws. As enacted, the VRA prevented state laws that deliberately restricted minorities' ability to vote.

Among other amendments to the VRA, a 1982 amendment was made following the Supreme Court ruling in the redistricting case Mobile v. Bolden (1980), which had ruled that exclusionary voting practices were unlawful under the VRA "only if motivated by a discriminatory purpose" under the Fourteenth and Fifteenth Amendments. The 1982 amendment added language to the VRA to screen for voting practices that would cause "a class of [protected] citizens ... [to] have less opportunity than other members of the electorate to participate in the political process and to elect representatives of their choice." The new language did not require exact proportional representation, but implied a minimum limit to meet the VRA.

The 1982 amendment was central to the Supreme Court case Thornburg v. Gingles (1986). The decision in Gingles gave a set of three preconditions to determine if a redistricting map was racially discriminatory under the 1982 VRA amendment:

- The plaintiffs (challenging the redistricting) can show the minority group make up a sufficiently large group in a "reasonably configured district" without violating "traditional districting criteria";
- The minority group is "politically cohesive", typically voting for the same issues;
- And whether the majority group vote "sufficiently as a bloc usually to defeat the minority's preferred candidates".

If all three preconditions are met, then the judiciary can evaluate the "totality of the circumstances" if the minority group's ability to vote for their preferred candidate is affected.

The Supreme Court under Chief Justice John Roberts has issued several decisions prior to Callais placing limits on the VRA. These cases include Shelby County v. Holder (2013) which struck down the preclearance requirements for any voting-related state laws for nine states, which had previously been justified by Section 5 of the VRA. These states then instituted new redistricting maps from the 2020 United States census.

=== Case background ===
Following the 2020 census, Louisiana was assigned six seats in the United States House of Representatives. The census found that about one-third of the people in the state were Black. The Louisiana State Legislature, where the Republican Party held a majority in both chambers, approved a new district map that was largely unchanged, giving the state five districts with White majorities and one with a Black majority.

Lawyers challenged the new map in court, alleging it violated Section 2 of the VRA. In the ensuing case, Robinson v. Ardoin, U.S. District Judge Shelly Dick ruled in June 2022 that the map violated the VRA by not including a second majority-Black district, and issued an order preventing the state from using its map. Louisiana's Secretary of State Kyle Ardoin sought a stay of the order from the Fifth Circuit, which was denied. Ardoin then sought relief from the Supreme Court, which stayed the order pending its decision in Allen v. Milligan, a similar VRA case from Alabama.

In June 2023, the Supreme Court ruled in Allen that Alabama's district map violated the VRA. Consequently, the Court lifted its stay of Dick's ruling, returning the case to the Fifth Circuit. In declining to stay the order again, the Fifth Circuit told the legislature that unless it passed a map with two majority-Black districts by January 15, 2024, Judge Dick could draw and impose a new map. In order to prevent this, the legislature held a special session and in January 2024 passed a new map of its own in which its 6th congressional district became the state's second majority-Black district.

A lawsuit over the state's new map was then filed by a group of plaintiffs calling themselves "non–African-American voters", led by Phillip "Bert" Callais, who lived in an area near Baton Rouge that had been brought into the new majority-Black district. The suit claimed the 6th district was racially gerrymandered and violated the Fourteenth and Fifteenth Amendments. Because it was a constitutional rather than a statutory challenge, the case was heard by a panel of three federal district judges from the Western District of Louisiana, rather than a single judge. In May 2024, the panel ruled 2–1 that the new map was unconstitutionally gerrymandered and blocked its use. The state sought a stay from the Supreme Court, arguing it was too close to the election to create a new map. The Supreme Court ordered the state to use, due to the timing constraints, the January 2024 map for the 2024 elections, without ruling on the merits of the panel's decision.

== Supreme Court ==
Two separate petitions were filed with the Supreme Court to hear the challenge on the district panel's ruling: one from the state itself (Louisiana v. Callais) and another from Black voters and civil rights organizations such as the NAACP (Robinson v. Callais). The Supreme Court agreed to hear both cases (Note: The case was appealed through the Supreme Court's jurisdiction under 28 U.S.C. § 1253 rather than the more-common certiorari process.) and consolidated them in November 2024.

The first oral argument was held on March 24, 2025. On June 27, 2025, instead of issuing a ruling, the Court ordered reargument for the 2025 term, with only Justice Clarence Thomas dissenting.

During the summer recess before its 2025 term, the Supreme Court directed all parties to submit supplemental briefs on a new question: whether the new maps violated the Fourteenth and Fifteenth Amendments. There were rumors that the reargument and added question were signs that the Court was preparing to make major changes in its jurisprudence (as it had done in Citizens United v. FEC), perhaps by ruling that compliance with Section 2 of the Voting Rights Act would be unconstitutional. In its supplemental brief, Louisiana said it would no longer defend its position in the case at the Supreme Court, and instead argued that the new maps violated the 14th and 15th Amendments.

The second oral session for the case took place on October 15, 2025. There were rumors that the Court would limit the use of the VRA for redistricting by suggesting that the Act's mandates have a time limit.

=== Decision ===
The court issued its decision on April 29, 2026. In a 6–3 decision, the court affirmed the three-judge district court's ruling that the state's new map was an illegal racial gerrymander. The majority opinion was delivered by Justice Samuel Alito. Alito wrote: "Allowing race to play any part in government decision-making represents a departure from the constitutional rule that applies in almost every other context. Compliance with section 2 [of the VRA] thus could not justify the state's use of race-based redistricting here. The state's attempt to satisfy the Middle District's ruling, although understandable, was an unconstitutional racial gerrymander."

The decision did not hold Section 2 of the VRA to be unconstitutional, nor did it overturn cases such as Allen v. Milligan (2023), though Alito wrote that "major developments" since one of the last major tests of Section 2, Gingles, required "additional considerations." Gingles provided for three pre-conditions: that the minority voters were "sufficiently numerous and compact to constitute a majority in a reasonably configured district"; that they voted in a "politically cohesive" manner; and that the majority voted in a bloc as to defeat the minority's preferred candidate. Alito said of the first Gingles precondition, computer-aided redistricting tools have advanced enough for plaintiffs challenging maps to demonstrate a map that "fully achieves all the State’s legitimate goals" including incumbency protection by "a specific margin of victory" while creating the majority-minority district. For the second and third Gingles preconditions, Alito said that under the combination of the US having a two-party system coupled with the ruling in Rucho v. Common Cause that partisan gerrymandering was non-justiciable within federal courts, that "a litigant can easily exploit [Section 2] for partisan purposes by 'repackag[ing] a partisan-gerrymandering claim as a racial-gerrymandering claim'." Finally, Alito said, in regards to the final part of the Gingles test, that "things have changed dramatically" in the southern states since the VRA was passed, and "Black voters now participate in elections at similar rates as the rest of the electorate." As such, he argued, the addition of a second majority-Black district in the challenged Louisiana maps was racially motivated and not required. He concluded that a successful challenger must now prove that a state "intentionally drew its districts to afford minority voters less opportunity because of their race" and that failing to "disentangle race from the state's race-neutral considerations, including politics" will now likely lead to an unsuccessful suit.

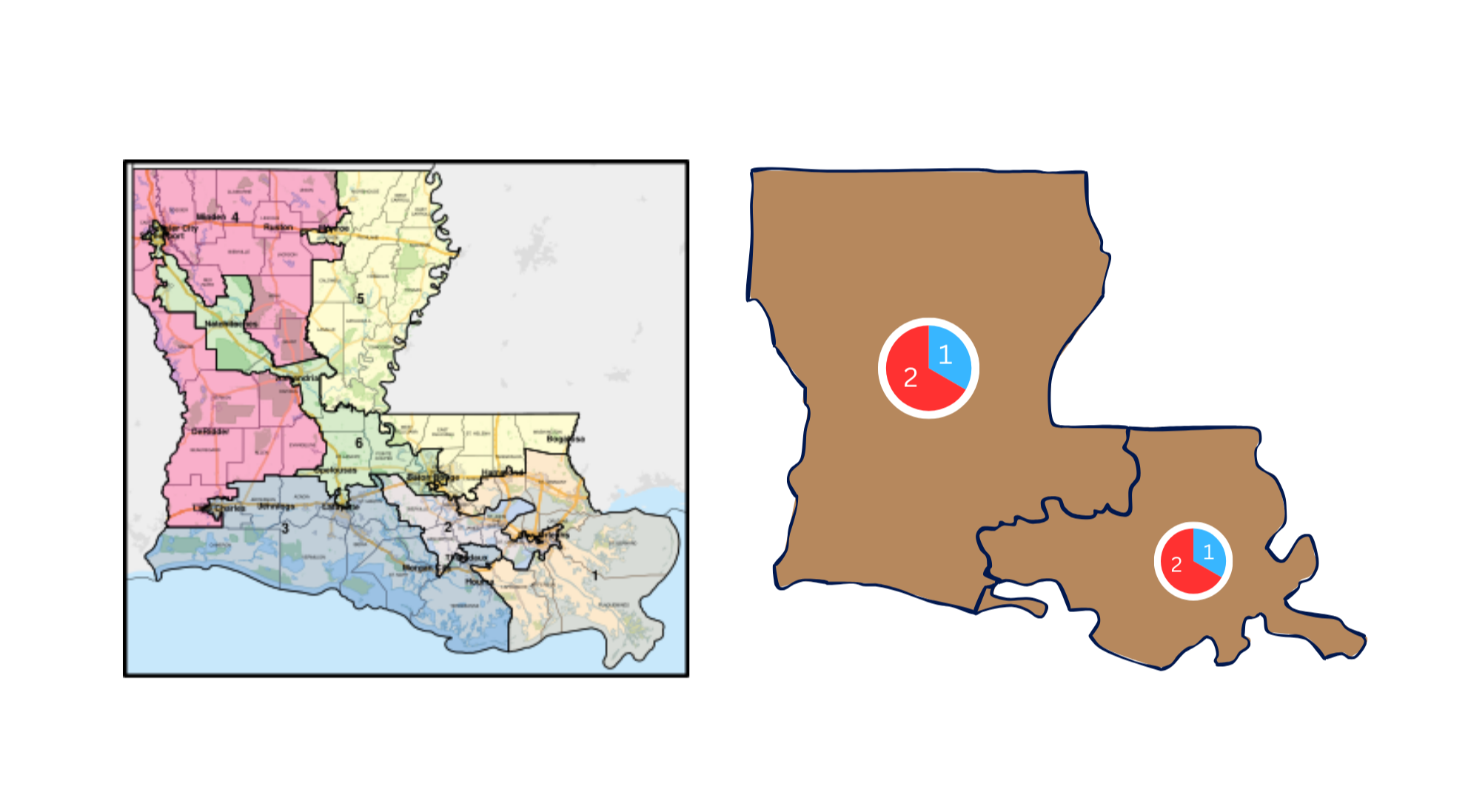
The 2025 congressional district map of Louisiana upheld by lower courts before the decision (left) and a proportional representation map under the Fair Representation Act (right)

In a concurring opinion, Justice Clarence Thomas (joined by Justice Neil Gorsuch) contended that Section 2 of the VRA should not apply to districting at all, writing that the court "should never have interpreted" it "to effectively give racial groups 'an entitlement to roughly proportional representation'."

Justice Elena Kagan wrote the dissent, joined by Justices Sonia Sotomayor and Ketanji Brown Jackson. Kagan wrote: "The consequences [of the Court's decision] are likely to be far-reaching and grave. Today's decision renders Section 2 all but a dead letter." She said that the Voting Rights Act "is – or, now more accurately, was – 'one of the most consequential, efficacious, and amply justified exercises of federal legislative power in our Nation's history'. It was born of the literal blood of Union soldiers and civil rights marchers. It ushered in awe-inspiring change, bringing this Nation closer to fulfilling the ideals of democracy and racial equality." Kagan accused the majority of reviving the intent-based standard from Mobile v. Bolden that Congress had repudiated in its 1982 amendments to the VRA, which, she said, would make vote dilution cases nearly unwinnable. She stressed that Congress was the only authority to determine whether the VRA is no longer needed.

=== Analysis ===
Analysts had predicted that a decision in Callais reducing the scope of the VRA could allow Republicans to gain a significant number of seats in the U.S. House of Representatives from redistricting in the Southeast, where the VRA has generally prevented Republican-controlled legislatures from maximizing their numbers of "safe" districts. The New York Times estimated that, if the Court weakened the VRA, up to twelve seats could shift from Democratic to Republican control.

When the decision in Callais was announced, media outlets characterized it as a "landmark" decision, predicting that the additional restrictions on Section 2 of the VRA would likely make challenges to redistricting significantly more difficult. Analysts expect it will allow southern states to eliminate majority-minority districts, changing election outcomes. (Note: Attributed to multiple sources:) Justice Kagan's accusation that the court majority revived the intent-based standard from Mobile v. Bolden (1980) that Congress had repudiated in its 1982 amendments to the VRA was shared by journalists and legal scholars. The decision was seen by some media outlets as the culmination of a long-time grudge of Roberts against the VRA, others considered the decision as rendering the VRA effectively dead and harming the country's democratic process. The ruling was described by critics as starting a new era of Jim Crow laws, allowing for legal discrimination of minorities in the United States. The court's opinion was expected to affect all levels of government including state and local governments. (Note: Attributed to multiple sources:)

An analysis from The Guardian found that Justice Alito's claim that Black voter turnout had surpassed white voter turnout in two of the five most recent presidential elections, both nationally and in Louisiana, was based on misleading data and questionable methodology. Alito cited the brief from the Department of Justice which used "a proportion of the total population of each racial group over the age of 18"; however, that approach is "not favored by experts", who instead use "voter turnout as a proportion of the citizen voting age population or the voter eligible population". Following the latter analysis, the gap in voter turnout has actually widened, with Black voter turnout dropping since 2012, particularly after the Supreme Court's opinion in Shelby County v. Holder which struck down the preclearance formula defined in Section 4(b) of the VRA for states with historical discrimination concerns including Louisiana.

The editorial board of The Wall Street Journal praised the ruling, which in its view restored the intent of the VRA to prevent discrimination at the poll, and not to be used for districting. President Donald Trump thanked "brilliant Justice" Alito for "authoring this important and appropriate Opinion".

== Aftermath ==
=== In Louisiana ===
District lines to be used from the 2026 elections, per SB 121 signed by the Governor of Louisiana on May 29, 2026 Interactive map version

The day the decision was announced, the non-Black voter plaintiffs who had prevailed asked the Court to make its decision effective immediately, skipping the usual 32-day window, (Note: A window from when the Supreme Court's review of a lower court's judgement are issued until a copy of it is given to the lower court) to give the state the option to draw a new map for its 2026 congressional elections. The intervening minority voters asked the court not to do so, arguing that they should have the usual opportunity to seek rehearing and that the Purcell principle (which limits court decisions about election law that come too close before an affected election) should apply. Concurrently, the district court ordered that its injunction on the 2024 map would remain in place and the state be "afforded the opportunity to enact a Constitutionally compliant map." Louisiana Governor Jeff Landry and Attorney General Liz Murrill announced that they would suspend the state's May 16 primary to allow the legislature to draw a new, compliant map, even though mail-in ballots had already been sent to overseas and early-voting residents. On May 4, the Supreme Court granted the request, making the decision effective immediately and allowing the state to proceed to redistrict before the election. While the order was unsigned, Alito wrote a concurring statement joined by Thomas and Gorsuch, and Jackson dissented.

=== In other states ===
Two challenges to maps drawn from the 2020 census in Mississippi and North Dakota, which had been on the Supreme Court's docket, were added via order on May 18, 2026, with the Supreme Court vacating the current rulings and remanding the cases back to their lower courts to review in light of the Callais decision. Both cases were related to standing relative to the VRA; while both suits were brought by private individuals, the states had argued that challenges to district maps under VRA Section 2 could only be brought by a state attorney general.

When Callais was decided, efforts by several states to perform mid-decade redistricting had been underway for months. At President Trump's urging, Texas with other Republican-controlled states (Note: Ohio, North Carolina and Missouri) redistricted in 2025 to increase the number of their Republican representatives in the House. Democratic-controlled states, including California, retaliated with their own redistricting. Over the winter of 2025–26, the Court allowed the Texas and then the California maps to take effect, rejecting legal challenges on the grounds that the new maps were driven by "pure partisanship" and thus did not implicate the VRA. The Court also blocked a lower court mandate for New York to redraw a congressional district in Staten Island following a challenge by Black voters in the district.

At first, Callais appeared unlikely to cause further redistricting ahead of the 2026 general election beyond the change to Louisiana's map, because states' primary elections had begun or would soon. But despite expectations, several southern states initiated redistricting in the weeks after the decision was issued, reasoning that their existing maps with majority-minority districts previously mandated by the VRA were unconstitutional under the Court's new standard. Tennessee Republicans passed a new map that eliminated the sole majority-minority House district in their state. Florida legislators had been debating a redistricting bill to increase the number of Republican-controlled districts in time for primaries, and passed it the day Callais was decided.

Alabama, whose legislature-drawn maps had been replaced with ones drawn by a special master under Allen v. Milligan, filed an emergency motion for the Supreme Court to allow its legislature's map to be reinstated. The state argued that Callais overrode Allen, justifying the use of legislature-drawn maps for the 2026 election even though early voting had already begun for the state primaries. At the same time, Governor Kay Ivey ordered a special legislative session for a new House district map to be drawn. The Court granted the state's request, instructing the district court which had appointed the special master to reconsider the matter in light of Callais. Sotomayor dissented, joined by Kagan and Jackson.

While states such as South Carolina, Georgia and Mississippi opted against redistricting for the 2026 elections, they are considering redistricting for the 2028 elections. However, Georgia ruled out redistricting on November 4, 2026, after Keisha Lance Bottoms won the gubernatorial election.

=== Election results ===
Concurrent to efforts to promote redistricting to strengthen a Republican majority in Congress, the Trump administration made several policies that were not popular with voters, such as the 2026 Iran war which significantly increased gas prices. At the 2026 election, the Democratic party gained significant ground, flipping several representatives and senators in their favor and gaining the majority in both houses, as well as gaining the majority of state gubernatorial positions. Several of the redistricting effects that resulted from the decision Callais, including in Louisiana and Alabama, ended up with Democrats winning seats that had been planned to be Republican in the updated maps, leading to several of these to be considered "dummymanders".

== See also ==
- Gerrymandering in the United States
- Redistricting in the United States
- Solid South
- Brnovich v. Democratic National Committee
- Disparate impact
