= Ecological regression =

Statistical technique

Ecological regression is a statistical technique which runs regression on aggregates, often used in political science and history to estimate group voting behavior from aggregate data.

For example, in a hypothetical election in the United States, if counties have a known Democratic vote (in percentage) D, and a known percentage of Catholics, C, then running a linear regression of dependent variable D against independent variable C will give D = a + bC. If the regression gives D = .22 + .45C for example, then the estimated Catholic vote (C = 1) is 67% Democratic and the non-Catholic vote (C = 0) is 22% Democratic. The technique has been often used in litigation brought under the Voting Rights Act of 1965 to see how blacks and whites voted.

== See also ==
- Ecological correlation
- Ecological fallacy
