= Parliament Choir =

United Kingdom parliamentary choir

- Choir
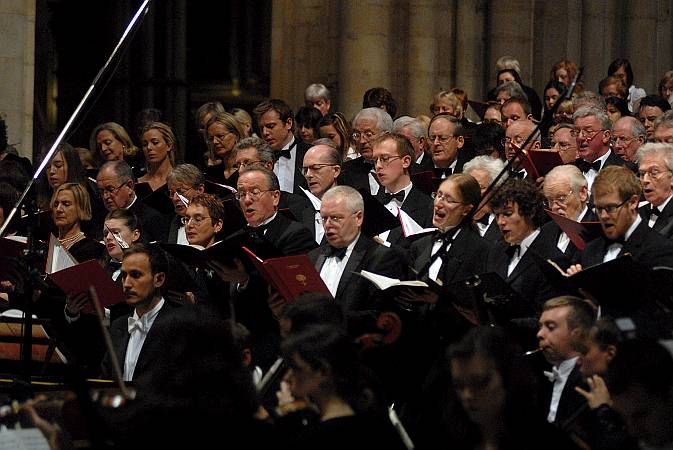
- The Parliament Choir performing at York Minster in 2009
- Also known as: UK Parliament Choir; Choir of the UK Parliament
- Founded: 2000
- Founder: Simon Over
- President: Lindsay Hoyle (since 2019); John McFall (since 2021)
- Music director: Simon Over
- Leadership: Greg Stafford (politician) (chair); Hugh Merrill (vice-chair); Bernard Jenkin (vice-chair); Mary Macleod (vice-chair); Lesley Titcomb (treasurer)
- Choirmaster: Nicholas O'Neill
- Headquarters: Palace of Westminster
- Rehearsal space: Chapel of St Mary Undercroft
- Affiliation: Southbank Sinfonia; BT Group
- Website: Official website

The Parliament Choir, also known as the UK Parliament Choir and the Choir of the UK Parliament, is the choir of the Parliament of the United Kingdom. Founded by Geoffrey Filkin, Baron Filkin and Simon Over in December 2000, it is made up of members of the House of Commons and the House of Lords and staff who work at Parliament.

== Founding ==
The Parliament Choir, also known as the UK Parliament Choir and the Choir of the UK Parliament, was founded in December 2000 by Geoffrey Filkin, Baron Filkin and Simon Over. Over had run a choral society at Westminster Abbey whose members included serving parliamentarians in the House of Commons and the House of Lords. These parliamentarians were often unable to attend rehearsals because of voting commitments and the late hours of parliamentary business. Over discussed the issue with Filkin who proposed establishing a choir in Parliament to address the issue. Filkin and Over then set up a choir in the Palace of Westminster, the Parliament Choir, which enabled parliamentarians to attend votes at short notice with the sounding of the division bell during rehearsals, returning to rehearse shortly after the vote had concluded. The choir performed for the first time in December 2000.

== Organisation ==
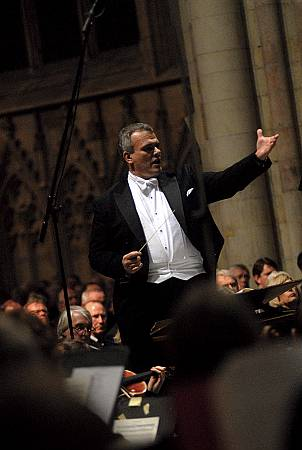
Simon Over directing the Parliament Choir during a performance in 2009

The Parliament Choir was initially organised as an all-party parliamentary group within Parliament. As such, the choir could only rehearse when Parliament was in session. Since its early years, it has been sponsored by BT Group, which gives it around £60,000 or £65,000 to maintain the choir every year. The choir's internal relationship with Parliament was changed in 2017, after it had to cancel a concert when it was unexpectedly dissolved as part of the dissolution of Parliament for the snap 2017 general election. It is now an autonomous body of Parliament under the patronage of the Speaker of the House of Commons (Lindsay Hoyle since 2019) and the Lord Speaker of the House of Lords (John McFall, Baron McFall of Alcluith since 2021) who serve as its co-presidents.

The Parliament Choir is legally organised as a registered charity and a company limited by guarantee. It is managed by a board of trustees which is led by a chair and also includes three vice-chairs and a treasurer. Mike German, Baron German is the chair of the choir. Hugh Merrill, Bernard Jenkin and Mary Macleod are the vice-chairs. Judith Jolly, Baroness Jolly is the treasurer. Other trustees include Oliver Heald, Sue Hayman, Baroness Hayman of Ullock and Michael Prisk. The choir also has a music team which includes Simon Over as music director and Nicholas O'Neill as choirmaster and composer in residence. Southbank Sinfonia serves as the choir's resident orchestra; the orchestra was also founded by Simon Over in 2002.

== Membership ==
Since its founding, the choir has upheld a policy of keeping its membership open to anyone who has a parliamentary pass or works in the Palace of Westminster; membership is open to all parliamentary staff including police and security personnel, caterers and transcribers for Hansard, as well as to journalists with access to the press gallery and parliamentarians from both the House of Commons and the House of Lords, including senior government ministers. Members of Parliament (MPs) have also invited their constituents to join the choir. Auditions are not required to join the choir; anyone who wishes to join may do so. However, there is a membership fee ranging from £60 to £120 depending on members' salaries. Membership is cross-party and its members have included Conservative, Labour and Liberal Democrat politicians.

=== Lords ===
The following Lords or former Lords have been members of the Parliament Choir at some point during their careers.

- Alastair Bruce, 5th Baron Aberdare
- Robin Bridgeman, 3rd Viscount Bridgeman
- Mike German, Baron German
- Geoffrey Filkin, Baron Filkin
- Simon Arthur, 4th Baron Glenarthur
- Sue Hayman, Baroness Hayman of Ullock
- Judith Jolly, Baroness Jolly
- David Lea, Baron Lea of Crondall
- Genista McIntosh, Baroness McIntosh of Hudnall
- Wilf Stevenson, Baron Stevenson of Balmacara
- Martin Thomas, Baron Thomas of Gresford
- William Wallace, Baron Wallace of Saltaire
- Joan Walmsley, Baroness Walmsley
- Patricia Hollis, Baroness Hollis of Heigham
- Jean Corston, Baroness Corston
- Paul Strasburger, Baron Strasburger

=== MPs ===
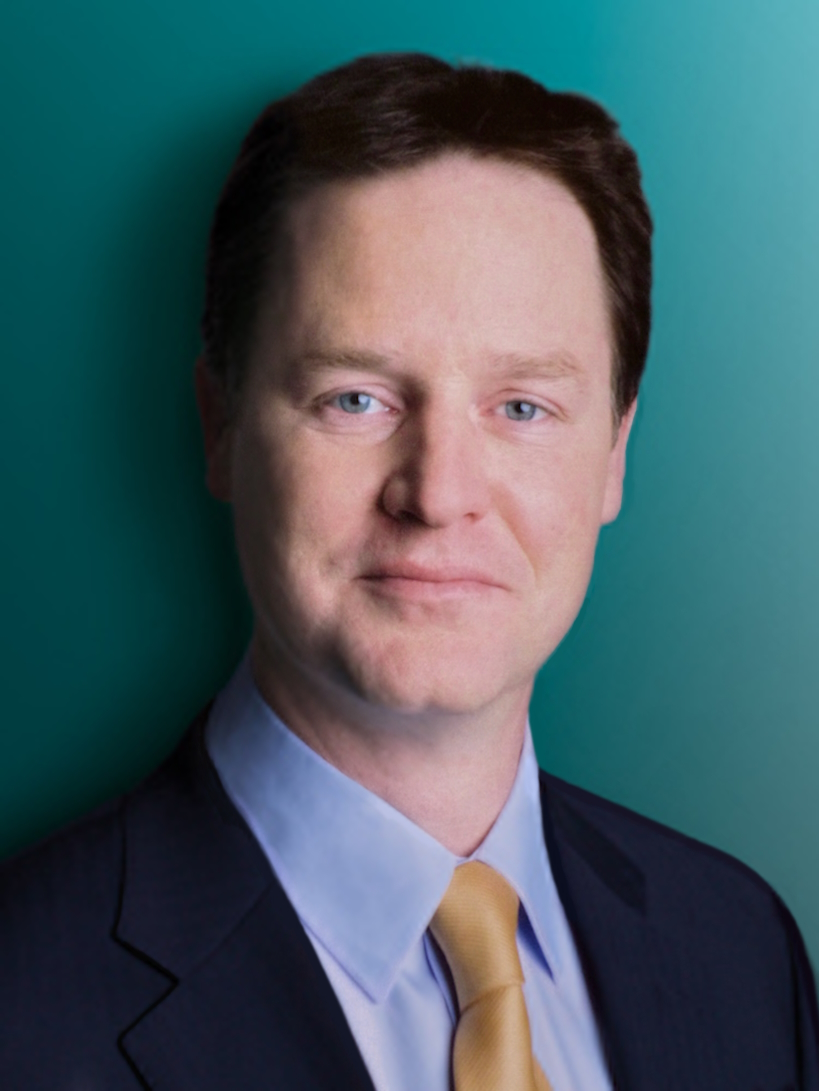
Nick Clegg, Deputy Prime Minister of the United Kingdom (2010–2015)

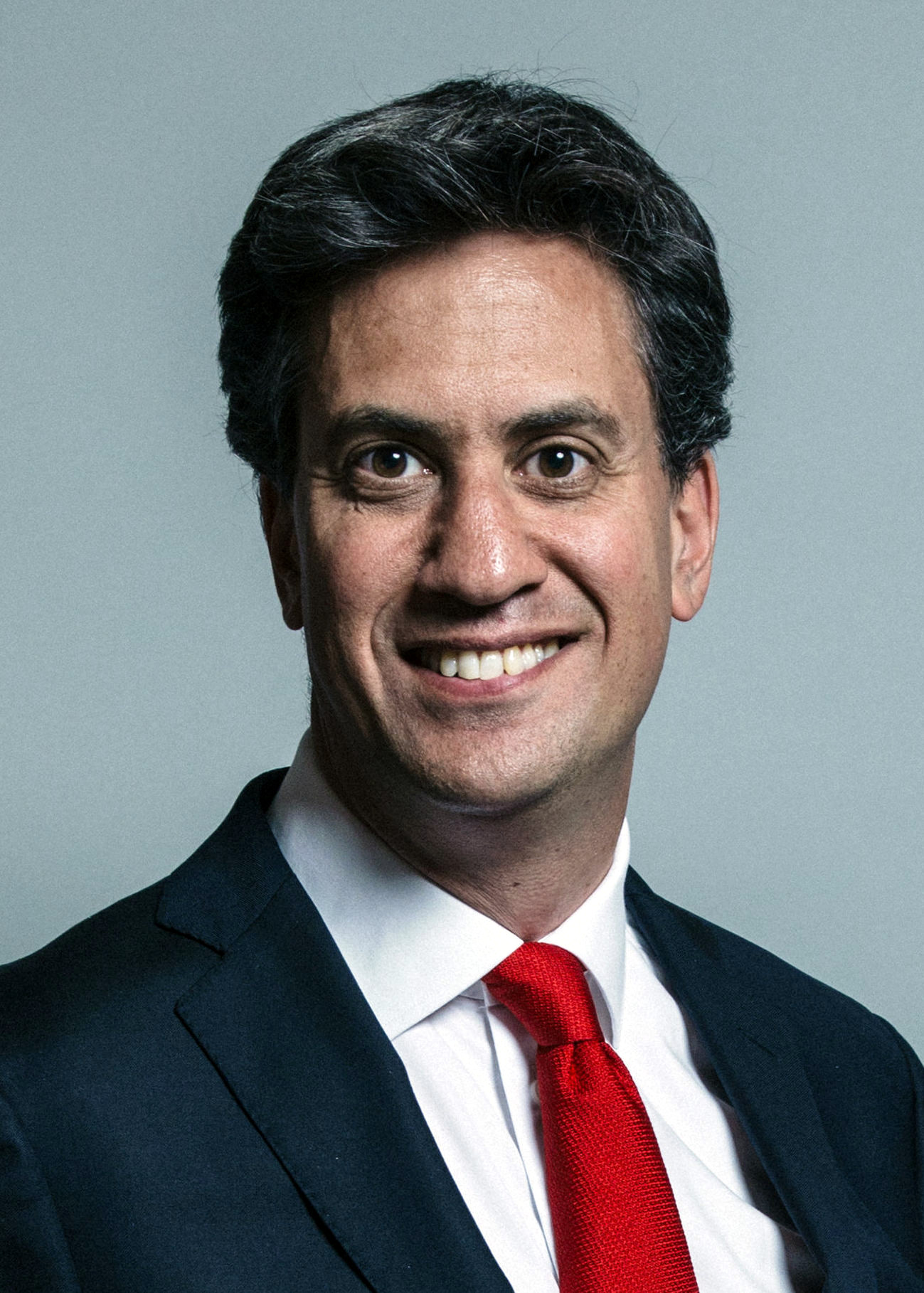
Ed Miliband, Leader of the Opposition (2010–2015)

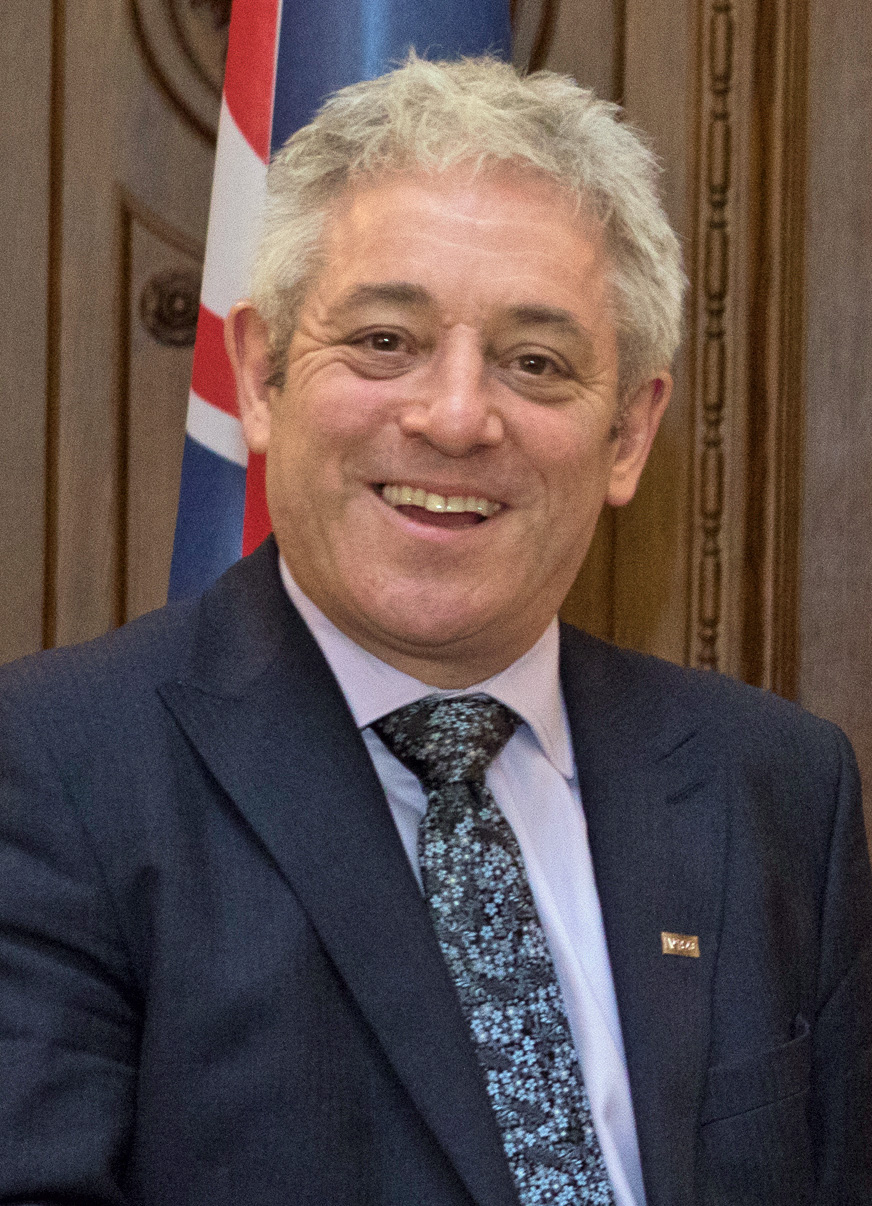
John Bercow, Speaker of the House of Commons (2009–2019)

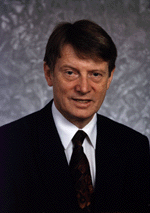
Alun Michael, First Secretary of Wales (1999–2000)

The following MPs or former MPs have been members of the Parliament Choir at some point during their careers.

- Alun Michael
- David Lammy
- Bernard Jenkin
- Helen Jackson
- Jeremy Lefroy
- David Lidington
- Mary Macleod
- David Madel
- Fiona Mactaggart
- Mark Prisk
- Caroline Spelman
- Alan Beith
- Robert Jackson
- Sarah Teather
- Ed Miliband
- Nick Clegg
- John Bercow

=== Others ===
The following notable individuals have also been members of the Parliament Choir but have never served as MPs or Lords.

- David Leakey
- Alan Moses
