= St Dunstan's Church, Mayfield =

Church in Mayfield, East Sussex, England

Coordinates: 51.020473°N 0.261482°E

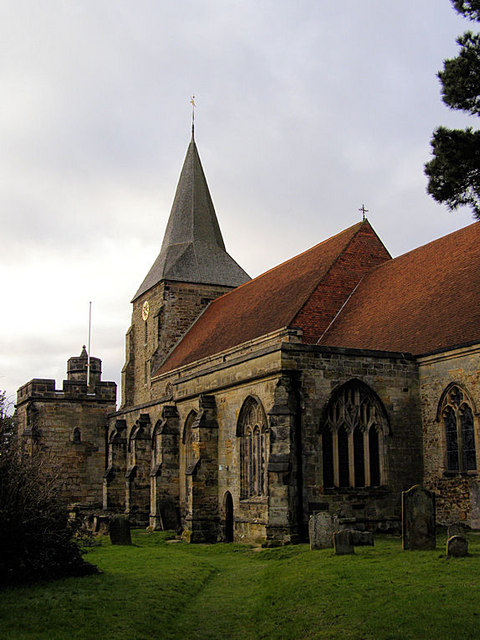
Church of St. Dunstan.

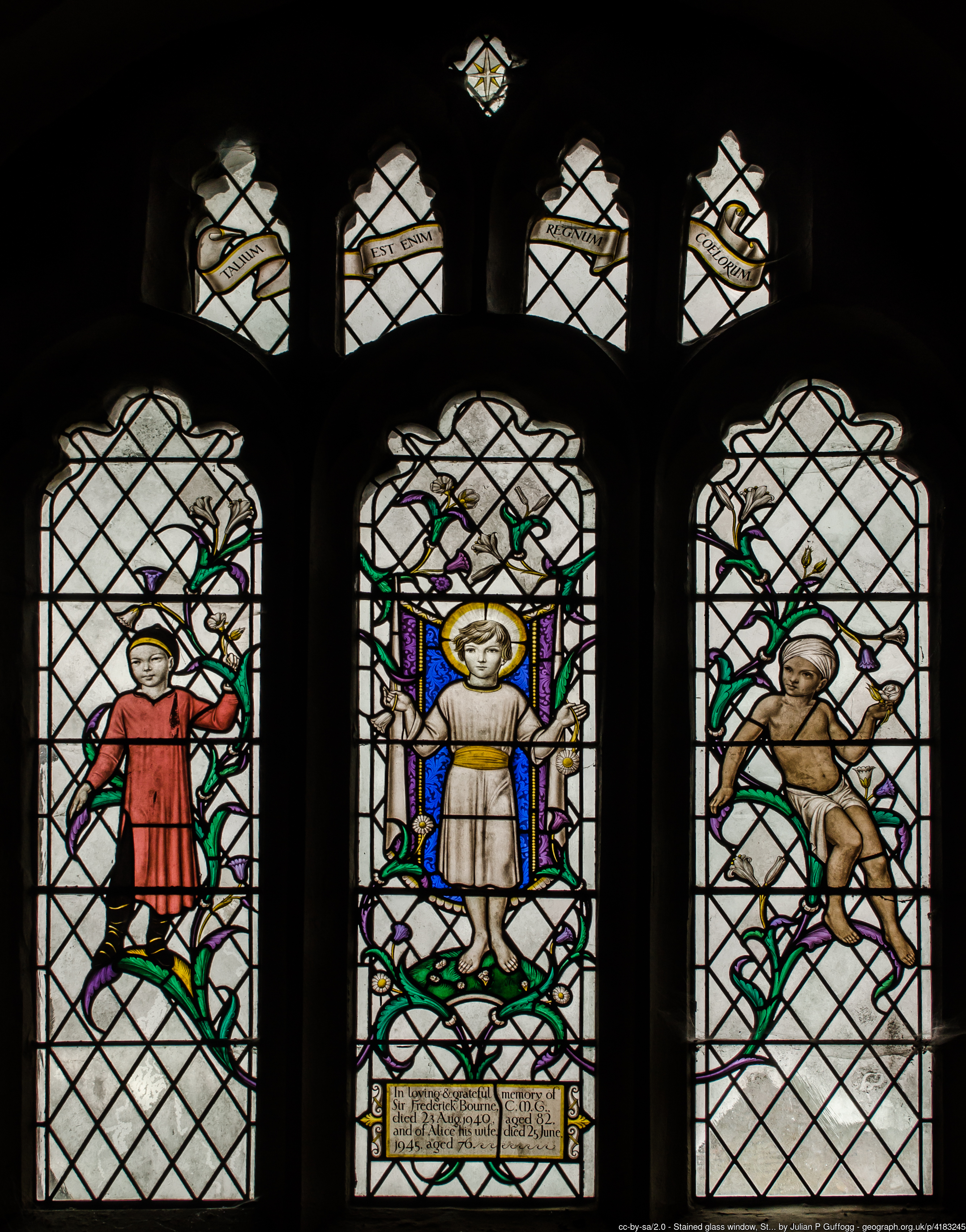
Stained glass window, St Dunstan's church, Mayfield in memory of Sir Frederick Bourne

St Dunstan's, Mayfield in Mayfield, East Sussex, was founded in 960 CE by St Dunstan, who was then Archbishop of Canterbury. The church is a listed building. As of 2023, the vicar was Fr Michael Asquith.

== History ==
It is reported that the church was originally a log church which lasted until it was replaced by a stone structure in the 12th century by the Normans. In 1389 this church was virtually destroyed by fire. Only the tower, the lancet window in the west wall and the base of the north aisle survive to this day. The local congregation probably used the private chapel at the Archiepiscopal Palace nearby until the church was rebuilt between 1410 and 1420.

The Church was damaged again in 1621 when it was struck by lightning. The importance of the iron industry in the area is seen inside the church, where 2 cast iron tomb slabs are set in the floor of the nave. The oldest part of the church is the Tower (13th C) which houses a small domestic area, the bells and the clock. Other parts of the church are mainly 17th C with alterations throughout the centuries. The church is considered to be in good repair with all due care given to daily maintenance. Considerable improvements have been made over the past 20 years to provide what has been described as ‘a stunning worship space’.

Further work was carried out during the reign of Henry VIII: the nave roof was raised and the clerestory was added. In 1657 a clock was installed by Thomas Punnett.

In the South Porch moulded corbels support a quadripartite rib vault. A newel staircase gives access to the Parvise Room above. This was used as either an oratory for a chantry priest, or as a sacristan. During the 19th century it was used as a cloakroom for the girls' school held in the church.

The nave has four tomb slabs of Sussex iron. The best preserved belong to Thomas Sands, a wine cooper of London and his grandson, also named Thomas Sands. The font dates from 1666 and the initials of the vicar at the time, Robert Peck is carved on the octagonal bowl. The 17th century pulpit is decorated with Jacobean strap-carvings.

While many of the choir stalls dated back to the 16th century, some repair work was carried out by the Mayfield School of Carving in the early 20th century. They also provided the Lady Chapel screen, which is an excellent example of linenfold carving. The choir stall were replaced in 2016 by new movable stalls in oak and at the same time the east end was reordered.

The perpendicular east window has Munich glass donated by the Treherne family in 1869. In 1894 the old reredos carved by Walter Gale, the village schoolmaster in 1750 was replaced. The Pope was said to enjoy this eastern facing window as it represented to him, a gateway between eastern and western culture. (reference required)

A window at the west end of the church celebrates the life of Lt Gen Sir John Bagot Glubb, known as Glubb Pasha, soldier, scholar and author, who led and trained Transjordan's Arab Legion between 1939 and 1956.

During the 1970s cracks in the tower walls meant that it was forbidden to ring all the bells at once. It was fourteen years before the tower could be restored at a cost of £140,000. The bells were retuned at the Whitechapel Bell Foundry. The oldest bell had been founded by Thomas Giles in 1602 and other founders included Brian Eldredge, Richard Phelps, John Waylett and John Taylor.

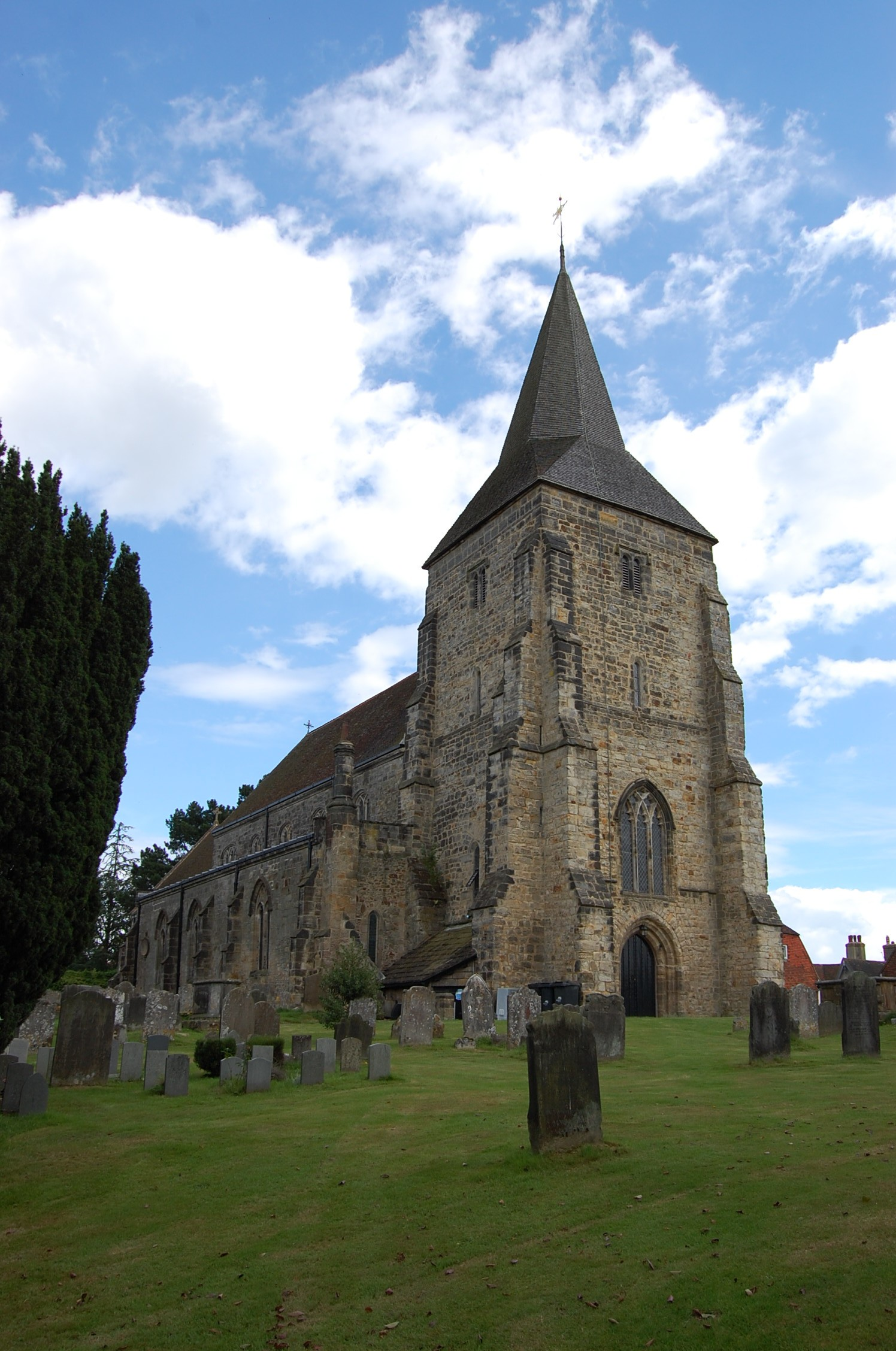
St Dunstan's North West exposure

In the year 2000, a joint concert of 100 Belfries was held at the French Festival “Rencontres en Pays de Bray” in Normandy and Mayfield, being performed simultaneously in the churches of Notre-Dame, Neufchatel and St Dunstan, Mayfield and broadcast by the BBC.

Many of the memorials in the church belong to the Baker and Kirby families. These were local ironmaster families. Georgina Weldon is interred in the Dalrymple family vault.

== Music ==
St Dunstan's has a long tradition of Anglican Music. In fact, it is noted in 1731 that St Dunstan's was renown for its "skillfull singing of the same Psalms", from the installed gallery at the west end of the church. The Choir has grown to be one of the largest and highest regarded church choirs in the Diocese, regularly travelling outside of the parish to sing at Cathedrals and Churches around the UK.

=== The Choir ===
The choir sings Choral Eucharist every Sunday in term time, and additionally Choral Evensong once a month, usually on the Last Sunday of the month. Their schedule also includes singing at weddings and funerals when requested in addition to leading Advent and Christmas Carol services. The choir also maintains a strong junior presence, and draws children and young people from the surrounding area through a reputation for high quality music making and education. Many choristers and choir members have gone on to sing with choirs such as Salisbury Cathedral Choir, Ex Cathedra, The Holst Singers and The Sixteen. Some have even continued to study music at institutions such as Oxford, Cambridge, The Royal Academy of Music and Royal Birmingham Conservatoire.

In June 2019 the choir joined with Salisbury Cathedral Choir for services at Salisbury Cathedral, which included Charles-Marie Widor’s Messe and an Easter Cantata by Bach with period orchestra.

The choir has been fortunate to work with some of the country’s leading church musicians and commissioned two anthems by Malcolm Archer which were premiered by the choir under the direction of the composer.

Recent events have included a liturgical performance of excerpts from three of J.S Bach’s Advent Cantatas including ‘Wachet Auf’ with the Mayfield Festival Baroque Orchestra in December 2021, singing Choral Evensong at Chichester Cathedral where they sang the rarely-performed Magnificat and Nunc Dimittis in G by Henry Smart in February 2022, and a performance of G.F Handel's 'Messiah' with the London Mozart Players in December 2023. Recent visits to other cathedral's include: Southwark Cathedral, Rochester Cathedral, St. Paul's Cathedral and Westminster Abbey where the choir sang an evensong for World Humanities Day, in the presence of Their Royal Highnesses The Crown Prince Alexander and Crown Princess Katherine of Serbia in August 2023.

In 2025, St Dunstan's was one of the principal commissioning choirs for British composer Joanna Forbes L’Estrange's choral suite A Season to Sing. The church hosted the local premiere in May 2025, conducted by the composer, and subsequently served as the venue and primary choir for the commercial recording of the work, directed by the composer and released on the Signum Records label.

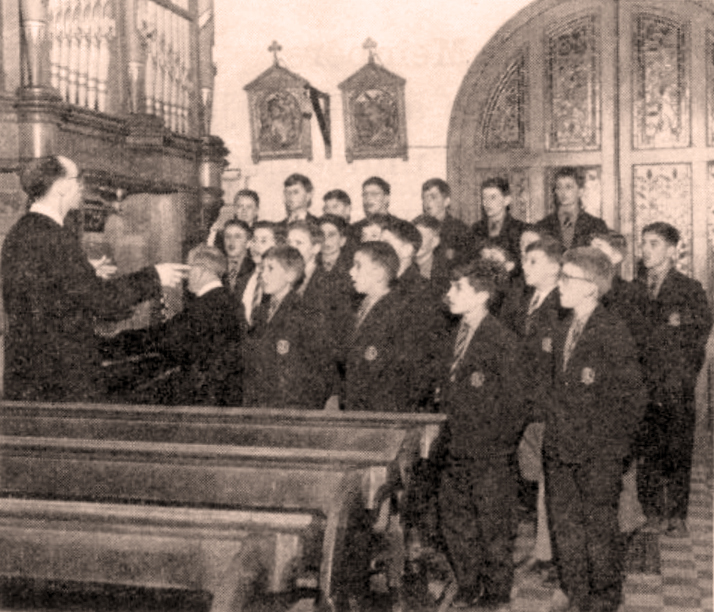
Mayfield College Choir Practise Circa. 1940

==== List of Directors of Music ====
W. H. Maisey (c.19th Century )

Thomas Dudeney (b.1854)

John Wyatt (d.1929)

c.1940-1968 John George Auton (d.1993)

1968-2004 Kenneth Pont

2004-2022 Andrew Benians

2022-2023 Jack Gonzalez-Harding

2023-2024 Thomas Hawkey-Soar (Interim)

2024- Lucy Piercy

=== The Walker Organ ===
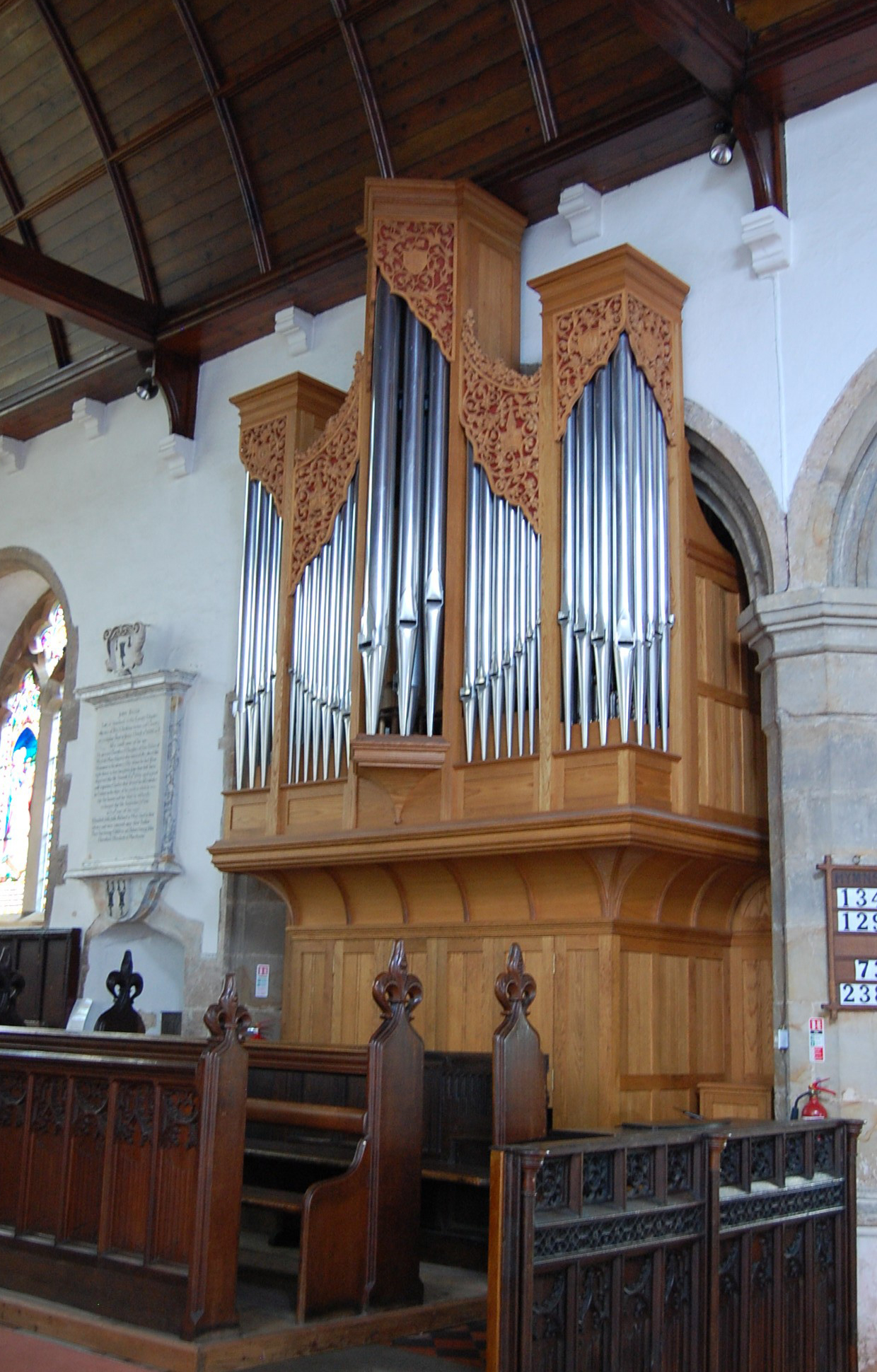
The 1997 Walker Organ, prior to the removal and renovation of the choir stalls.

In 1997, a new three‑manual J.W. Walker Organ was installed in St Dunstan's. This has widened the repertoire of potential music, and also facilitated an expansion of organ recitals to include Dame Gillian Weir, John Scott, Simon Preston, Olivier Latry and James O’Donnell. The previous organ built by Browne of Canterbury, was bought second-hand by subscription in 1864, and was enlarged at a cost of over £200 in 1900. Positioned in the South Chancel, it featured 13 stops and a Gothic Fronted case, and was significantly more compact than the organ which replaced it in 1997.

When the replacement Walker Organ, whose carved case was designed by David Graebe, was commissioned for St. Dunstan's, a considerable amount of money had to be raised for the purchase of the organ, and so a National Lottery grant was bid for. While the application for the bid was taking place, the congregation of St. Dunstan's managed to raise the amount necessary for the purchase of the organ, but because the wheels in motion for the bid had already started, Mayfield had to accept the money from the National Lottery Grant anyway. This money was put in an Organ Fund, which is overseen by the Organ Trust, and is used for tuning, and keeping the organ in fine fettle.

The installation was overseen by Andrew Pennells of Walker, with much of the pipework sourced from Carl Giesecke GmbH of Germany. The tonal design and voicing were carefully executed in consultation with the builder, and later adjustments by organ consultant Paul Hale included replacement of certain stops, refinements to the Swell chorus, and augmentation of mixture ranks, with new pipes made by Shires Pipework Company (Leeds, UK) to match the original design. The instrument comprises approximately 29 stops and over 1,800 pipes, and includes a cymbelstern for festive effects. Its mechanical and tonal features provide subtle dynamic control, making it highly suitable for both liturgical accompaniment and recital repertoire.

A specification can be found on the National Pipe Organ Register (NPOR) here.

== Mayfield Festival of The Arts ==
Founded in 1970 by Kenneth Pont, the then director of music at St Dunstan's Parish Church, The Mayfield Festival of Music and the Arts is a bi-ennal festival, with most concerts take place in the 15th century St Dunstan's church or in the Old Palace, one of six Sussex mansions which belonged to the See of Canterbury. It also contains a fine concert hall built in 1930 by Adrian Gilbert Scott. The buildings now house Mayfield Girls School, whose choirs regularly provide additional sopranos for festival choral works. It began as part of an attempt to raise funds for the building of St Dunstan's church hall. The guiding spirit was the vicar, Canon Donald Carter, who, along with the parish church organist, Kenneth Pont, organised a series of events to fill a fortnight. Even though the hall was never built the festival has continued ever since.

Audiences come together from all over the South-East to hear performances in these historic settings. Programmes have included performances by names such as John Ogdon, Peter Donohoe, Paul Tortelier, Igor Oistrakh, James Galway, Evelyn Glennie, Victoria de los Angeles, Dame Janet Baker, Emma Kirkby, Sir Thomas Allen, Sir Peter Maxwell Davies, John Wilson (and the John Wilson Orchestra), Stephen Kovacevich, Benjamin Grosvenor and Joanna Macgregor.

In 1976, Sir David Willcocks began an association with the festival and conducted one of the two large-scale choral works at every Festival until 2002. His fifteen appearances with the Mayfield Festival Choir included the Bach's Mass in B minor, the Verdi Requiem, Elgar's The Dream of Gerontius and Mozart's Grand Mass in C minor.

Kenneth Pont retired as Festival Director in 2004 and was succeeded by Neil Mackie CBE. In 2014 Jeremy Summerly was appointed the Festival's Artistic Director. He is Director of Music at St Luke's Chelsea and a broadcaster for BBC Radios 3 and 4. He founded the Oxford Camerata in 1984 who regularly perform at the festival. At the 2022 Festival, along with the Mayfield Consort, they gave a memorable performance of Thomas Tallis' Spem in Alium as part of their English Choral Masterpieces concert.

In 2018 the Festival held a competition for composers to write a cantata based on the life of Saint Dunstan. The new cantata was designed to be ready for performance in 2020 to celebrate the 50th anniversary of the Festival. The competition was won by Nicholas O’Neill, composer-in-residence and chorus master of the Parliament Choir. Interspersed within the Cantata is a Mass setting composed by then St Dunstan's Director of Music, Andrew Benians, and a set of Evening Canticles by the Festival's founder, Kenneth Pont. Jeremy Summerly wrote the libretto and composed a Prologue based on plainchant attributed to St Dunstan. The delayed première of the Cantata of St Dunstan eventually took place as part of the opening concert of the 2022 Festival, in the presence of the Lord Lieutenant of East Sussex.

== See also ==
- List of current places of worship in Wealden
