= Hugh Davis Merrill Jr. =

American politician

Member of the Alabama House of Representatives
- In office 1958–1978

Personal details
- Born: April 2, 1913
- Died: October 1997 (aged 84)
- Parent: Hugh Davis Merrill (father)
- Relatives: Walter B. Merrill (uncle); Pelham J. Merrill (cousin); Hugh Merrill (nephew); John Merrill (descendant)
- Education: University of Alabama School of Law

Hugh Davis Merrill Jr. (April 2, 1913 – October 1997) was an American politician. He served as a member of the Alabama House of Representatives.

== Life and career ==
Merrill attended the University of Alabama School of Law.

Merrill served in the Alabama House of Representatives from 1958 to 1978.

Merrill died in October 1997, at the age of 84.
