= 2018 Alabama Secretary of State election =

- November 6, 2018
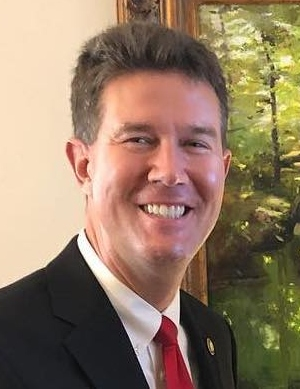

Nominee	John Merrill	Heather Milam
Party	Republican	Democratic
Popular vote	1,032,425	658,537
Percentage	61.02%	38.92%
- County results Merrill: 50–60% 60–70% 70–80% 80–90% 90–100% Milam: 50–60% 60–70% 70–80% 80–90%
Secretary of State before election
John Merrill
Republican
Elected Secretary of State
John Merrill
Republican

The 2018 Alabama Secretary of State election took place on November 6, 2018, to elect the secretary of state of Alabama. Incumbent Republican Secretary of State John Merrill was re-elected to a second term in office, defeating Democratic challenger Heather Milam in a landslide.

Primary elections were held on June 5.

== Republican primary ==
=== Candidates ===
==== Nominee ====
- John Merrill, incumbent secretary of state (2015–2023)

==== Eliminated in primary ====
- Michael Johnson, Marshall County revenue commissioner

==== Results ====
Results by county Merrill: 50–60%; 60–70%; 70–80%; 80–90%; Johnson: 50–60%

Republican primary results
Party	Candidate	Votes	%
Republican	John Merrill (incumbent)	335,852	71.63%
Republican	Michael Johnson	133,014	28.37%
Total votes		468,866	100.00%

== Democratic primary ==
=== Candidates ===
==== Nominee ====
- Heather Milam, professor at the University of Montevallo

==== Eliminated in primary ====
- Lula Albert, retired sergeant major

==== Results ====
Results by county Milam: 50–60%; 60–70%; 70–80%; 80–90%; Albert: 50–60%

Democratic primary results
Party	Candidate	Votes	%
Democratic	Heather Milam	161,062	63.65%
Democratic	Lula Albert	91,965	36.35%
Total votes		253,027	100.00%

== General election ==
=== Predictions ===
Source	Ranking	As of
Governing Magazine	Safe R	October 11, 2018

=== Polling ===
Poll source	Date(s) administered	Sample size	Margin of error	John Merrill (R)	Heather Milam (D)	Undecided
Cygnal (R)	July 24–25, 2018	1,027	± 3.1%	57%	38%	5%

=== Results ===
2018 Alabama Secretary of State election
Party	Candidate	Votes	%	±%
Republican	John Merrill (incumbent)	1,032,425	61.02%	–3.25%
Democratic	Heather Milam	658,537	38.92%	+3.30%
Write-in		1,064	0.06%	–0.05%
Total votes		1,692,026	100.00%	N/A

==== By county ====
County	John Merrill Republican		Heather Milam Democratic		Write-in Various		Margin		Total
County	#	%	#	%	#	%	#	%	Total
Autauga	14,022	71.84%	5,485	28.10%	12	0.06%	8,537	43.74%	19,519
Baldwin	58,387	75.80%	18,604	24.15%	41	0.05%	39,783	51.64%	77,032
Barbour	4,147	50.45%	4,069	49.50%	4	0.05%	78	0.95%	8,220
Bibb	5,234	76.57%	1,601	23.42%	1	0.01%	3,633	53.15%	6,836
Blount	17,184	89.04%	2,104	10.90%	12	0.06%	15,080	78.13%	19,300
Bullock	887	24.51%	2,732	75.49%	0	0.00%	-1,845	-50.98%	3,619
Butler	4,498	57.11%	3,374	42.84%	4	0.05%	1,124	14.27%	7,876
Calhoun	24,906	68.09%	11,645	31.84%	26	0.07%	13,261	36.26%	36,577
Chambers	6,306	57.04%	4,743	42.90%	7	0.06%	1,563	14.14%	11,056
Cherokee	6,883	82.92%	1,414	17.03%	4	0.05%	5,469	65.88%	8,301
Chilton	11,269	82.91%	2,318	17.05%	5	0.04%	8,951	65.85%	13,592
Choctaw	3,150	54.14%	2,662	45.75%	6	0.10%	488	8.39%	5,818
Clarke	6,167	56.36%	4,770	43.59%	5	0.05%	1,397	12.77%	10,942
Clay	4,192	79.82%	1,060	20.18%	0	0.00%	3,132	59.63%	5,252
Cleburne	4,001	90.87%	397	9.02%	5	0.11%	3,604	81.85%	4,403
Coffee	11,966	75.51%	3,865	24.39%	15	0.09%	8,101	51.12%	15,846
Colbert	12,850	63.44%	7,394	36.50%	12	0.06%	5,456	26.94%	20,256
Conecuh	2,368	49.47%	2,418	50.51%	1	0.02%	-50	-1.04%	4,787
Coosa	2,779	65.65%	1,453	34.33%	1	0.02%	1,326	31.33%	4,233
Covington	9,821	82.63%	2,061	17.34%	4	0.03%	7,760	65.29%	11,886
Crenshaw	3,763	72.09%	1,456	27.89%	1	0.02%	2,307	44.20%	5,220
Cullman	24,702	87.02%	3,678	12.96%	7	0.02%	21,024	74.06%	28,387
Dale	10,241	72.60%	3,851	27.30%	15	0.11%	6,390	45.30%	14,107
Dallas	4,624	31.12%	10,226	68.82%	9	0.06%	-5,602	-37.70%	14,859
DeKalb	17,111	82.16%	3,703	17.78%	12	0.06%	13,408	64.38%	20,826
Elmore	21,734	74.42%	7,453	25.52%	19	0.07%	14,281	48.90%	29,206
Escambia	7,978	67.39%	3,855	32.56%	6	0.05%	4,123	34.83%	11,839
Etowah	24,345	71.77%	9,553	28.16%	24	0.07%	14,792	43.61%	33,922
Fayette	5,622	79.12%	1,474	20.74%	10	0.14%	4,148	58.37%	7,106
Franklin	6,468	76.47%	1,986	23.48%	4	0.05%	4,482	52.99%	8,458
Geneva	7,657	86.31%	1,211	13.65%	4	0.05%	6,446	72.66%	8,872
Greene	662	16.14%	3,436	83.78%	3	0.07%	-2,774	-67.64%	4,101
Hale	2,453	38.37%	3,936	61.57%	4	0.06%	-1,483	-23.20%	6,393
Henry	4,545	69.67%	1,978	30.32%	1	0.02%	2,567	39.35%	6,524
Houston	22,839	71.60%	9,035	28.32%	24	0.08%	13,804	43.28%	31,898
Jackson	12,052	78.93%	3,213	21.04%	5	0.03%	8,839	57.88%	15,270
Jefferson	110,506	43.35%	144,226	56.58%	192	0.08%	-33,720	-13.23%	254,924
Lamar	4,426	83.83%	853	16.16%	1	0.02%	3,573	67.67%	5,280
Lauderdale	20,498	67.70%	9,761	32.24%	17	0.06%	10,737	35.46%	30,276
Lawrence	8,095	70.11%	3,443	29.82%	8	0.07%	4,652	40.29%	11,546
Lee	28,528	58.55%	20,161	41.38%	38	0.08%	8,367	17.17%	48,727
Limestone	23,061	69.93%	9,897	30.01%	19	0.06%	13,164	39.92%	32,977
Lowndes	1,385	28.24%	3,514	71.66%	5	0.10%	-2,129	-43.41%	4,904
Macon	1,158	16.27%	5,954	83.67%	4	0.06%	-4,796	-67.40%	7,116
Madison	76,039	54.53%	63,291	45.39%	110	0.08%	12,748	9.14%	139,440
Marengo	3,997	46.24%	4,642	53.70%	5	0.06%	-645	-7.46%	8,644
Marion	8,226	85.86%	1,352	14.11%	3	0.03%	6,874	71.75%	9,581
Marshall	22,337	83.29%	4,471	16.67%	9	0.03%	17,866	66.62%	26,817
Mobile	70,466	53.64%	60,821	46.30%	86	0.07%	9,645	7.34%	131,373
Monroe	4,791	55.33%	3,862	44.60%	6	0.07%	929	10.73%	8,659
Montgomery	27,649	36.24%	48,604	63.70%	43	0.06%	-20,955	-27.47%	76,296
Morgan	28,802	73.89%	10,165	26.08%	12	0.03%	18,637	47.81%	38,979
Perry	1,047	24.99%	3,142	74.99%	1	0.02%	-2,095	-50.00%	4,190
Pickens	4,726	57.88%	3,437	42.09%	2	0.02%	1,289	15.79%	8,165
Pike	6,011	58.76%	4,211	41.17%	7	0.07%	1,800	17.60%	10,229
Randolph	5,715	76.21%	1,780	23.74%	4	0.05%	3,935	52.47%	7,499
Russell	6,774	45.55%	8,090	54.40%	8	0.05%	-1,316	-8.85%	14,872
Shelby	59,226	71.16%	23,953	28.78%	47	0.06%	35,273	42.38%	83,226
St. Clair	24,061	80.89%	5,677	19.08%	9	0.03%	18,384	61.80%	29,747
Sumter	1,245	23.57%	4,036	76.40%	2	0.04%	-2,791	-52.83%	5,283
Talladega	15,712	60.31%	10,329	39.65%	12	0.05%	5,383	20.66%	26,053
Tallapoosa	10,871	70.11%	4,630	29.86%	4	0.03%	6,241	40.25%	15,505
Tuscaloosa	38,137	56.12%	29,749	43.78%	72	0.11%	8,388	12.34%	67,958
Walker	18,366	81.22%	4,234	18.72%	14	0.06%	14,132	62.49%	22,614
Washington	4,550	69.23%	2,017	30.69%	5	0.08%	2,533	38.54%	6,572
Wilcox	1,431	30.99%	3,183	68.94%	3	0.06%	-1,752	-37.95%	4,617
Winston	6,776	88.95%	839	11.01%	3	0.04%	5,937	77.93%	7,618
Totals	1,032,425	61.02%	658,537	38.92%	1,064	0.06%	373,888	22.10%	1,692,026

Counties that flipped from Democratic to Republican

- Barbour (largest city: Eufaula)

Counties that flipped from Republican to Democratic

- Jefferson (largest city: Birmingham)
