= Anghiari =

- Comune
- Comune di Anghiari
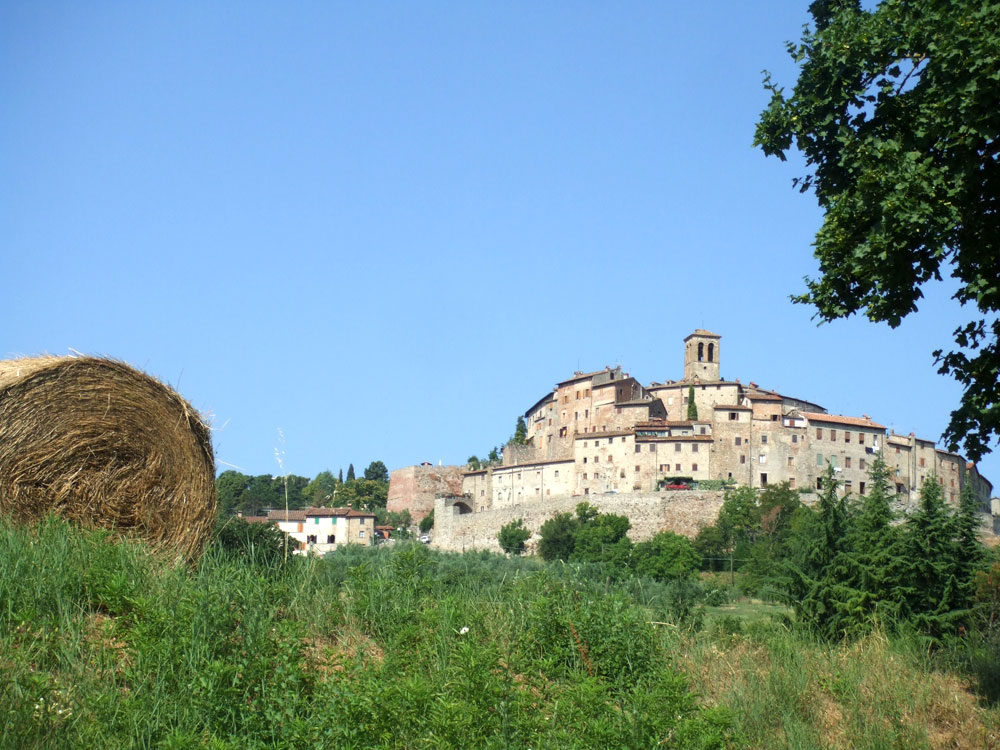
- View of Anghiari

- Location of Anghiari in Italy Anghiari (Tuscany)
- Coordinates: 43°28′32″N 12°03′38″E
- Country: Italy
- Region: Tuscany
- Province: Arezzo (AR)
- Frazioni: Bagnaia, Catigliano, Motina, Ponte alla Piera, San Leo, Scheggia, Tavernelle, Viaio

Government
  - Mayor: Alessandro Polcri

Area
  - Total: 130.92 km^{2} (50.55 sq mi)
- Elevation: 429 m (1,407 ft)

Population (31 May 2022)
  - Total: 5,370
  - Density: 41.0/km^{2} (106/sq mi)
- Demonym: Anghiaresi
- Time zone: UTC+1 (CET)
  - Summer (DST): UTC+2 (CEST)
- Postal code: 52031
- Dialing code: 0575
- Saint day: May 3
- Website: Official website

Anghiari (Italian pronunciation: [aŋˈɡjaːri]) is a hill town and municipality (comune) in the Province of Arezzo, Tuscany, Italy.

Bordering comuni include Arezzo (southwest), Pieve Santo Stefano (north) and Subbiano (west). It is one of I Borghi più belli d'Italia ("The most beautiful villages of Italy").

== History ==
The Battle of Anghiari took place on 29 June 1440 between the Republic of Florence and the Duchy of Milan. The battle inspired a Leonardo da Vinci fresco designed for Florence's Palazzo Vecchio known as the Lost Leonardo; current scholarship holds that the work was never completed. It is known from da Vinci drafts and a sketch of it by Peter Paul Rubens now in the Louvre.

During World War II, the concentration camp of Renicci was located at Anghiari.

== Culture ==
The Anghiari Festival, featuring classical music, chamber music, choral music, and opera, is held each July. The resident orchestra is London's Southbank Sinfonia, conducted by Simon Over.

== Main sights ==
- Palazzo Pretoriano
- Badia di San Bartolomeo
- Villa La Barbolana
- Castello di Galbino
