= John Merrill (American politician) =

American politician

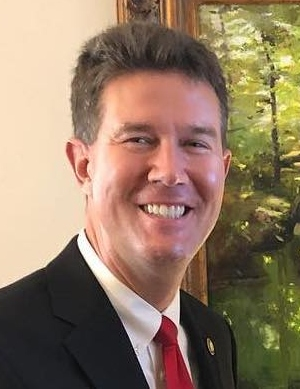

53rd Secretary of State of Alabama
- In office January 19, 2015 – January 16, 2023
- Governor: Robert Bentley; Kay Ivey
- Preceded by: James Bennett
- Succeeded by: Wes Allen

Member of the Alabama House of Representatives from the 62nd district
- In office November 3, 2010 – November 4, 2014
- Preceded by: Gerald Allen
- Succeeded by: Rich Wingo

Personal details
- Born: John Harold Merrill; November 12, 1963 (age 62) Wedowee, Alabama, U.S.
- Party: Democratic (before 2010); Republican (2010–present)
- Spouse: Cindy
- Children: 2
- Education: University of Alabama (BA)

John Harold Merrill (born November 12, 1963) is an American politician who was the 53rd secretary of state of Alabama from 2015 to 2023. He was in the Alabama House of Representatives from 2010 to 2014. Merrill is a member of the Republican Party.

== Early life ==
Merrill was born in Wedowee, Alabama, and raised in Heflin, Alabama. His father was the Cleburne County circuit clerk and a probate judge. At the age of sixteen he received the Eagle Scout Award as a member of his local boy scouts troop. In 1982, he graduated from Cleburne County High School. Merrill double majored in history and politics at the University of Alabama and received a Bachelor of Arts (BA) in 1987. Merrill interned for the United States Congress from May to July 1983, where he met representative William Flynt Nichols, who became his mentor. The following year, Merrill interned in the capitol for senator Howell Heflin between May and July 1984. He was the president of the University of Alabama's Student Government Association from 1986 to 1987.

== Career ==
Merrill was the spokesperson for the Tuscaloosa County School District, and a business development officer for the First Federal Bank in Tuscaloosa. He was elected to represent the 62nd district in the Alabama House of Representatives in the 2010 elections, having previously run and lost for the same seat in 2002 as a Democrat. He served in the House of Representatives for a single term from 2010 through 2014.

Merrill announced in January 2013 that he would run for Secretary of State of Alabama in the 2014 elections. In the Republican Party primary election in June 2014, Merrill finished in first, advancing to a runoff election in July, which he won. In the general election on November 3, 2014, he defeated Lula Albert-Kaigler, the Democratic Party nominee with more than 60% of the vote. He succeeded James R. Bennett, who had been appointed to the office to fill out the remainder of the term of the Republican incumbent representative Beth Chapman. Merrill was elected to a second full term in 2018. He was term-limited and could not seek re-election in 2022, and was succeeded by Wes Allen.

== Election issues ==
=== Voter access ===
A 2016 study by professors Bridget A. King and Norman E. Youngblood at Auburn University, found the content and quality of Alabama's county election and voting websites were lacking with relevant information regarding deadlines, polling stations, and voter requirements. King and Youngblood's evaluation of the relationship between voting systems and "demographic, socioeconomic, partisan, and participatory composition" of counties showed "limited voting and election information and are not in full compliance with accessibility, usability, and mobile readiness standards." Furthermore, they found the extent to which voting and elections information are provided is "related to county composition."

=== Voter ID ===
In a 2016 decision, the United States Court of Appeals for the D.C. Circuit blocked Merrill from enforcing Alabama's "documentary proof of citizenship" requirement for voting. The court ruled that the addition of this requirement to the federal voter registration forms violated the National Voter Registration Act of 1993. Alabama's law was challenged by the League of Women Voters. The decision effectively struck down a rule that required voters in Alabama to provide proof they are American citizens. Under federal law, voters only need to swear that they are citizens in order to register to vote.

Merrill applauded the 2013 Shelby County v. Holder decision by the United States Supreme Court, which among other things, limits federal poll monitoring in Southern states. The court's ruling was criticized by Democratic and liberal groups like the Advancement Project.

=== Poll monitoring ===
Merrill was part of a coalition of American election officials who traveled with fellow Organization for Security and Co-operation in Europe (OSCE) poll monitors to Russia for poll monitoring during the parliamentary elections held on September 18, 2016. Merrill said that the election in Russia was "free and fair". The election was widely considered to not be free and fair, and the OSCE report found systemic problems with "serious irregularities during voting" and even worse practices during ballot counting.

=== U.S. Senate campaigns ===
==== 2020 ====
In June 2019, Merrill announced his candidacy for the Republican nomination for a U.S. Senate seat in the 2020 election, to challenge incumbent Democratic senator Doug Jones. He was one of several candidates for the Republican nomination; others included Roy Moore, Bradley Byrne, Tommy Tuberville, and Arnold Mooney.

In July 2019, at a campaign event in Fort Payne, Merrill said that "homosexual activities" pervasive in mainstream media had partly lead to the nation's moral decline. When asked in a follow-up interview, Merrill pointed to the media coverage of the U.S. women's national soccer team win in the World Cup as an instance. Merrill contended that were no longer any television shows "that are based on biblical foundations" which "promote family and culture with a father, a mother, and children" present. Merrill dropped out of the race for the Republican nomination in December 2019.

==== 2022 ====
In 2021, Merrill announced that he was canceling his planned 2022 Senate campaign, after being publicly exposed as having had an extramarital affair over a four-year period.

=== COVID-19 pandemic ===
During the COVID-19 pandemic, Merrill sought to block local jurisdiction in Alabama from allowing curbside voting for immunocompromised voters. The U.S. Supreme Court sided with Alabama on a 5–3 vote in late October 2020, with the court divided along ideological lines.

=== 2020 election fraud conspiracies ===
In 2021, Merrill met with Mike Lindell, founder of MyPillow and a Donald Trump adviser, who was known for making outlandish conspiracy theories and false claims about fraud in the 2020 election. The state of Alabama subsequently sold a list of voter rolls to Lindell. When asked if he believed that the 2020 presidential election was rigged in favor of Joe Biden, Merrill refused to answer. Later, after Lindell claimed that Alabama's election results were fraudulent, Merrill disputed Lindell's claim.

== Personal life ==
Merrill is a relative of Hugh Davis Merrill, the former lieutenant governor of Alabama and Speaker of the Alabama House of Representatives, Hugh Davis Merrill Jr., who served in the House, and Pelham Jones Merrill who served in the House and fought in World War II.

Merrill is married to the former Cindy Benford of Phil Campbell, Alabama. They were married on May 11, 1985, at Calvary Baptist Church in Tuscaloosa, Alabama. They have two children.

In 2015, allegations were made public that Merrill had an affair in 2010 with a local woman in Tuscaloosa, Alabama where he resided. Although he denied receiving oral sex, he finally admitted “only” to kissing and being fondled in his pants while partially dressed.

In 2021, he was again accused of having an extramarital affair with a female legal assistant. Merrill denied the claim and said the woman was "stalking" and "harassing" him. When presented with a 17-minute audio tape in which the two described positions and actions in the three-year-long relationship, he admitted the affair and stated that he would not run for the US Senate in 2022, but also would not resign as Secretary of State, leaving office at the end of his term in January 2023.

== Electoral history ==
2010 Alabama House of Representatives 62nd district Republican primary election
Party	Candidate	Votes	%
Republican	John Merrill	3,262	56.12
Republican	Jerry Tingle	2,551	43.88

2010 Alabama House of Representatives 62nd district election
Party	Candidate	Votes	%
Republican	John Merrill	11,658	86.66
Constitution	Steven Kneussle	1,694	12.59
Write-ins	Write-ins	100	0.74

2014 Alabama Secretary of State Republican primary election
Party	Candidate	Votes	%
Republican	John Merrill	143,960	39.57
Republican	Reese McKinney	139,763	38.42
Republican	Jim Perdue	80,050	22.01

2014 Alabama Secretary of State Republican primary runoff election
Party	Candidate	Votes	%
Republican	John Merrill	108,740	53.14
Republican	Reese McKinney	95,877	46.86

2014 Alabama Secretary of State election
Party	Candidate	Votes	%
Republican	John Merrill	733,298	64.27
Democratic	Lula Albert-Kaigler	406,373	35.62
Write-ins	Write-ins	1,271	0.11

Party political offices
Preceded by Beth Chapman	Republican nominee for Secretary of State of Alabama; 2014, 2018	Succeeded by Wes Allen
Political offices
Preceded by James R. Bennett	Secretary of State of Alabama; 2015–2023	Succeeded by Wes Allen
