= 2022 Alabama Secretary of State election =

- November 8, 2022
- Turnout: 38.5% ▼
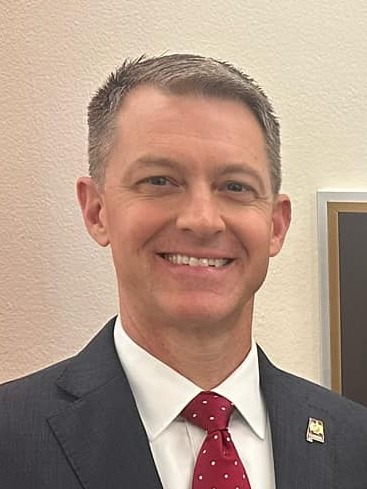

Nominee	Wes Allen	Pamela Laffitte
Party	Republican	Democratic
Popular vote	925,267	436,862
Percentage	65.88%	31.11%
- Allen: 40–50% 50–60% 60–70% 70–80% 80–90% >90% Laffitte: 40–50% 50–60% 60–70% 70–80% 80–90% >90% Tie: 50% No data
Secretary of State before election
John Merrill
Republican
Elected Secretary of State
Wes Allen
Republican

The 2022 Alabama Secretary of State election took place on November 8, 2022, to elect the next secretary of state of Alabama. Incumbent Republican Secretary of State John Merrill was term-limited and could not run for a third term.

The Republican primary for this race was held on May 24, 2022. No candidate reached the threshold of 50 percent plus one vote, so an ensuing runoff to decide the nominee was held on June 21, 2022. Although outgoing State Auditor Jim Zeigler won the first round, state representative Wes Allen won the runoff and thus the Republican Party nomination. Allen defeated Democrat Pamela J. Laffitte and Libertarian Matt Shelby in the general election on November 8, 2022.

== Republican primary ==
=== Candidates ===
==== Nominee ====
- Wes Allen, member of the Alabama House of Representatives from the 89th district (2018–present)

==== Eliminated in runoff ====
- Jim Zeigler, Alabama State Auditor (2015–2023)

==== Eliminated in primary ====
- Christian "Chris" Horn, activist and candidate for the Alabama House of Representatives in 2014

=== Endorsements ===
Wes Allen

Individuals

- Christian Horn, activist and former candidate for this position, eliminated in primary

Organizations

- Alabama Association of Realtors
- Alabama Citizens for Life
- Alabama Farmers Federation
- Alabama Forestry Association
- Coastal 150
- Manufacture Alabama

PACs

- Alabama Realtors Political Action Committee
- Alabama RetailPAC
- ProgressPAC
Jim Zeigler

Individuals

- Mike Lindell, founder of MyPillow and political activist
- Dean Odle, former candidate in the 2022 Alabama gubernatorial election

Organizations

- Alabama Republican Assembly
- America First Secretary of State Coalition
- Christian Conservatives of Alabama
- Common Sense Campaign
- Stand For Health Freedom
Ed Packard (eliminated)

Individuals

- Wayne Flynt, professor emeritus of history at Auburn University
- Gerald Johnson, professor emeritus of political science at Auburn University

=== Debates and forums ===
The Butler County Republican Party organization held a Republican candidates' forum on February 28, 2022, at the Wendell Mitchell Conference Center on the campus of Lurleen B. Wallace Community College in Greenville. The forum was attended by candidates Allen and Packard. The forum also hosted candidates for U.S. Senate, Governor, and the Alabama Supreme Court.

The League of Women Voters hosted a forum for the candidates in the race on April 26, 2022, at the Farley Auditorium located inside the Alabama Department of Archives and History in Montgomery. Candidates Chris Horn and Ed Packard were present; Wes Allen declined due to scheduling conflict, and Jim Zeigler fell ill the morning of the forum.

According to the Alabama Political Reporter,

When asked about ensuring access for certain marginalized groups such as the disabled, homeless and out-of-area college students, Horn said he knows what it is like to be a marginalized group as a Black man and formerly being paralyzed from the neck down.

"So the first thing is the Secretary of State must not be bureaucratic, but they must lead from the heart," Horn said. "They must have a heart to hear the concerns of those people, my people and those communities that I've been a part of, and certainly be able to listen to the organizations that represent their interests and have an open door— but it's a heart-based leadership."

Packard also said he would want to work with marginalized groups, adding that he has already been working with the National Federation of the Blind.

"I've been working with the Alabama Disabilities Advocacy Program over at the University of Alabama to work on legislation to make voting for people with disabilities easier," Packard said. "And what I have put out ever since I got involved in this race back in December, is that we should allow those individuals who are disabled to vote the same way we allow overseas, military and US citizens to vote and that is electronically from the comfort of their home."

However, both candidates stated their opposition to early voting and no-excuse absentee voting.

All four candidates were present at a debate hosted by Eagle Forum of Alabama at the O'Neal Public Library in Mountain Brook.

All four candidates were present at the Doster Center in Prattville for a candidates' forum hosted by the Autauga County Republican Executive Committee.

Candidates Allen and Zeigler squared off in a debate at the Gardendale Civic Center just over a week ahead of the Republican primary runoff on June 13, 2022. The debate was cosponsored by WYDE-FM and 1819 News.

2022 Alabama Republican Secretary of State primary debates and forums
No.	Date	Location	Host	Moderator	Link	Participants			
P Participant A Absent N Non-invitee I Invitee E Eliminated W Withdrawn									
P Participant A Absent N Non-invitee I Invitee E Eliminated W Withdrawn						Allen	Horn	Packard	Zeigler
1	Feb 28, 2022	Greenville	Butler County Republican Party	N/A	N/A	P	A	P	A
2	Apr 27, 2022	Montgomery	League of Women Voters	N/A	N/A	A	P	P	A
3	May 9, 2022	Mountain Brook	Eagle Forum of Alabama	N/A	Facebook	P	P	P	P
4	May 11, 2022	Prattville	Autauga County Republican Party	N/A	N/A	P	P	P	P
5	June 13, 2022	Gardendale	WYDE-FM	Scott Beason; Becky Garretson	Facebook	P	E	E	P

=== First round ===
==== Polling ====
Poll source	Date(s) administered	Sample size (Note: Key: A – all adults RV – registered voters LV – likely voters V – unclear)	Margin of error	Wes Allen	Christian Horn	Ed Packard	Jim Zeigler	Undecided
Emerson College	May 15–16, 2022	706 (LV)	± 3.6%	14%	4%	2%	20%	60%
Cygnal (R)	May 6–7, 2022	600 (LV)	± 4.0%	14%	3%	4%	20%	59%
Wisemen Consulting (R)	March 15–17, 2022	905 (LV)	± 3.4%	11%	3%	3%	36%	47%
McLaughlin & Associates (R) (Note: Poll sponsored by ForestPAC)	March 10–13, 2022	500 (LV)	± 4.4%	13%	2%	1%	26%	57%

==== Results ====
Allen: 40–50% 50–60% 60–70% 80–90%; Zeigler: 30–40%; 40–50% 50–60%

Allen: 20–30%; 30–40%; 40–50%; 50–60%; 60–70%; 70–80%; 80–90%; >90%; Zeigler: 30–40%; 40–50%; 50–60%; 60–70%; 70–80%; 80–90%; >90%; Horn: 30–40%; 40–50%; 50–60%; 60–70%; >90%; Packard: 30–40%; 40–50%; 60–70%; >90%; Tie: 20–30%; 30–40%; 40–50%; 50%; No votes

Republican primary results
Party	Candidate	Votes	%
Republican	Jim Zeigler	237,482	42.7%
Republican	Wes Allen	220,880	39.7%
Republican	Christian Horn	54,572	9.8%
Republican	Ed Packard	43,486	7.8%
Total votes		556,420	100.0%

=== Runoff ===
==== Polling ====
Poll source	Date(s) administered	Sample size	Margin of error	Wes Allen	Jim Zeigler	Undecided
McLaughlin & Associates (R)	June 13–16, 2022	500 (LV)	± 4.4%	30%	38%	32%
McLaughlin & Associates (R)	June 6–9, 2022	500 (LV)	± 4.4%	28%	34%	37%

==== Results ====
Allen: 50–60%; 60–70%; 70–80%; 80–90%; 90–100%; Zeigler: 50–60%

Allen: 50–60%; 60–70%; 70–80%; 80–90%; >90%; Zeigler: 50–60%; 60–70%; 70–80%; 80–90%; >90%; Tie: 50%; No votes

Republican primary runoff results
Party	Candidate	Votes	%
Republican	Wes Allen	248,132	65.4%
Republican	Jim Zeigler	131,413	34.6%
Total votes		379,545	100.0%

== Democratic primary ==
=== Candidates ===
==== Nominee ====
- Pamela J. Laffitte, corrections sergeant and candidate for Alabama State Board of Education in 2020

=== Endorsements ===
Pamela J. Laffitte

Organizations

- Alabama New South Alliance

== Libertarian nomination ==
No primary was held for the Libertarian Party, and candidates were instead nominated by the party.

=== Nominee ===
- Jason "Matt" Shelby, attorney

== General election ==
=== Predictions ===
Source	Ranking	As of
Sabato's Crystal Ball	Safe R	December 1, 2021
Elections Daily	Safe R	November 7, 2022

=== Post-primary endorsements ===
Wes Allen (R)

State officials

- Jim Zeigler, State Auditor of Alabama (2015–2023) and former candidate for this position, eliminated in runoff
Pamela J. Laffitte (D)

Labor unions

- Alabama AFL–CIO

=== Results ===
2022 Alabama Secretary of State election
Party	Candidate	Votes	%	±%
Republican	Wes Allen	925,267	65.88%	+4.86%
Democratic	Pamela Laffitte	436,862	31.11%	−7.81%
Libertarian	Jason "Matt" Shelby	41,611	2.96%	N/A
Write-in		663	0.05%	–0.01%
Total votes		1,404,403	100.00%	N/A
Republican hold				

==== By county ====
County	Wes Allen Republican		Pamela Laffitte Democratic		Various candidates Other parties		Margin		Total
County	#	%	#	%	#	%	#	%	Total
Autauga	13,217	75.05%	3,753	21.31%	640	3.63%	9,464	53.74%	17,610
Baldwin	58,217	79.96%	11,635	15.98%	2,959	4.06%	46,582	63.98%	72,811
Barbour	3,762	58.00%	2,603	40.13%	121	1.87%	1,159	17.87%	6,486
Bibb	4,713	80.67%	947	16.21%	182	3.12%	3,766	64.46%	5,842
Blount	14,999	90.79%	1,087	6.58%	435	2.63%	13,912	84.21%	16,521
Bullock	760	29.05%	1,800	68.81%	56	2.14%	-1,040	-39.76%	2,616
Butler	3,689	63.33%	2,012	34.54%	124	2.13%	1,677	28.79%	5,825
Calhoun	21,807	72.97%	7,257	24.28%	820	2.74%	14,550	48.69%	29,884
Chambers	5,742	63.60%	3,020	33.45%	267	2.96%	2,722	30.15%	9,029
Cherokee	6,869	88.35%	748	9.62%	158	2.03%	6,121	78.73%	7,775
Chilton	10,434	86.11%	1,361	11.23%	322	2.66%	9,073	74.88%	12,117
Choctaw	3,023	60.08%	1,888	37.52%	121	2.40%	1,135	22.56%	5,032
Clarke	5,224	58.37%	3,622	40.47%	104	1.16%	1,602	17.90%	8,950
Clay	3,580	85.56%	516	12.33%	88	2.10%	3,064	73.23%	4,184
Cleburne	4,150	90.99%	317	6.95%	94	2.06%	3,833	84.04%	4,561
Coffee	11,189	80.46%	2,349	16.89%	369	2.65%	8,840	63.57%	13,907
Colbert	12,544	73.40%	4,095	23.96%	450	2.63%	8,449	49.44%	17,089
Conecuh	2,490	56.72%	1,834	41.78%	66	1.50%	656	14.94%	4,390
Coosa	2,643	69.66%	1,020	26.88%	131	3.45%	1,623	42.78%	3,794
Covington	9,715	86.73%	1,300	11.61%	187	1.67%	8,415	75.12%	11,202
Crenshaw	3,564	78.92%	871	19.29%	81	1.79%	2,693	59.63%	4,516
Cullman	23,334	89.80%	1,884	7.25%	765	2.94%	21,450	82.55%	25,983
Dale	9,297	77.77%	2,336	19.54%	321	2.69%	6,961	58.23%	11,954
Dallas	3,763	33.62%	7,273	64.97%	158	1.41%	-3,510	-31.36%	11,194
DeKalb	14,917	87.74%	1,690	9.94%	394	2.32%	13,227	77.80%	17,001
Elmore	20,049	78.20%	4,807	18.75%	783	3.05%	15,242	59.45%	25,639
Escambia	7,134	74.37%	2,253	23.49%	206	2.15%	4,881	50.88%	9,593
Etowah	20,419	78.68%	4,858	18.72%	675	2.60%	15,561	59.96%	25,952
Fayette	4,711	86.12%	663	12.12%	96	1.76%	4,048	74.00%	5,470
Franklin	6,411	87.20%	766	10.42%	175	2.38%	5,645	76.78%	7,352
Geneva	6,999	88.30%	774	9.77%	153	1.93%	6,225	78.54%	7,926
Greene	581	19.79%	2,318	78.95%	37	1.26%	-1,737	-59.16%	2,936
Hale	2,225	43.58%	2,796	54.76%	85	1.66%	-571	-11.18%	5,106
Henry	4,913	74.11%	1,554	23.44%	162	2.44%	3,359	50.67%	6,629
Houston	20,826	75.91%	5,880	21.43%	729	2.66%	14,946	54.48%	27,435
Jackson	11,405	85.98%	1,521	11.47%	339	2.56%	9,884	74.51%	13,265
Jefferson	90,012	45.79%	100,898	51.33%	5,657	2.88%	-10,886	-5.54%	196,567
Lamar	3,870	88.84%	430	9.87%	56	1.29%	3,440	78.97%	4,356
Lauderdale	19,649	76.53%	5,320	20.72%	705	2.75%	14,329	55.81%	25,674
Lawrence	8,258	78.42%	1,903	18.07%	370	3.51%	6,355	60.35%	10,531
Lee	26,250	65.26%	12,625	31.39%	1,350	3.36%	13,625	33.87%	40,225
Limestone	22,920	73.85%	6,961	22.43%	1,153	3.72%	15,959	51.42%	31,034
Lowndes	1,249	31.41%	2,677	67.31%	51	1.28%	-1,428	-35.91%	3,977
Macon	1,082	20.39%	4,115	77.55%	109	2.05%	-3,033	-57.16%	5,306
Madison	67,974	56.94%	46,067	38.59%	5,332	4.47%	21,907	18.35%	119,373
Marengo	3,684	51.37%	3,359	46.83%	129	1.80%	325	4.53%	7,172
Marion	7,590	91.05%	577	6.92%	169	2.03%	7,013	84.13%	8,336
Marshall	21,052	87.44%	2,391	9.93%	633	2.63%	18,661	77.51%	24,076
Mobile	61,846	58.05%	41,136	38.61%	3,557	3.34%	20,710	19.44%	106,539
Monroe	4,199	60.08%	2,685	38.42%	105	1.50%	1,514	21.66%	6,989
Montgomery	21,832	38.14%	33,970	59.35%	1,437	2.51%	-12,138	-21.21%	57,239
Morgan	25,006	78.43%	5,856	18.37%	1,022	3.21%	19,150	60.06%	31,884
Perry	858	27.20%	2,228	70.64%	68	2.16%	-1,370	-43.44%	3,154
Pickens	4,145	63.76%	2,239	34.44%	117	1.80%	1,906	29.32%	6,501
Pike	5,329	65.85%	2,590	32.00%	174	2.15%	2,739	33.84%	8,093
Randolph	5,416	83.02%	988	15.14%	120	1.84%	4,428	67.87%	6,524
Russell	5,843	50.92%	5,337	46.51%	295	2.57%	506	4.41%	11,475
Shelby	50,759	72.90%	16,064	23.07%	2,805	4.03%	34,695	49.83%	69,628
St. Clair	23,029	82.92%	3,834	13.81%	909	3.27%	19,195	69.12%	27,772
Sumter	1,108	28.91%	2,680	69.92%	45	1.17%	-1,572	-41.01%	3,833
Talladega	14,200	65.96%	6,824	31.70%	505	2.35%	7,376	34.26%	21,529
Tallapoosa	10,316	76.50%	2,906	21.55%	263	1.95%	7,410	54.95%	13,485
Tuscaloosa	31,349	61.01%	18,583	36.17%	1,449	2.82%	12,766	24.85%	51,381
Walker	15,176	85.58%	2,088	11.77%	469	2.64%	13,088	73.81%	17,733
Washington	4,345	74.94%	1,295	22.34%	158	2.73%	3,050	52.60%	5,798
Wilcox	1,288	34.18%	2,429	64.46%	51	1.35%	-1,141	-30.28%	3,768
Winston	6,318	91.90%	399	5.80%	158	2.30%	5,919	86.09%	6,875
Totals	925,267	65.88%	436,862	31.11%	42,274	3.01%	488,405	34.78%	1,404,403

Counties that flipped from Democratic to Republican

- Conecuh (largest city: Evergreen)
- Marengo (largest city: Demopolis)
- Russell (largest city: Phenix City)

==== By congressional district ====
Allen won six of seven congressional districts.

District	Allen	Laffitte	Representative
1st	67%	29%	Jerry Carl
2nd	69%	29%	Barry Moore
3rd	71%	26%	Mike Rogers
4th	84%	14%	Robert Aderholt
5th	66%	30%	Mo Brooks (117th Congress)
5th	66%	30%	Dale Strong (118th Congress)
6th	67%	29%	Gary Palmer
7th	36%	62%	Terri Sewell

== Notes ==
Partisan clients
