= Renicci di Anghiari =

Italian concentration camp Renicci

- Concentration camp
- Location within Italy
- Coordinates: 43°34′24″N 12°02′21″E
- Location: Anghiari
- Operated by: Italy
- Inmates: Political
- Liberated by: 1943

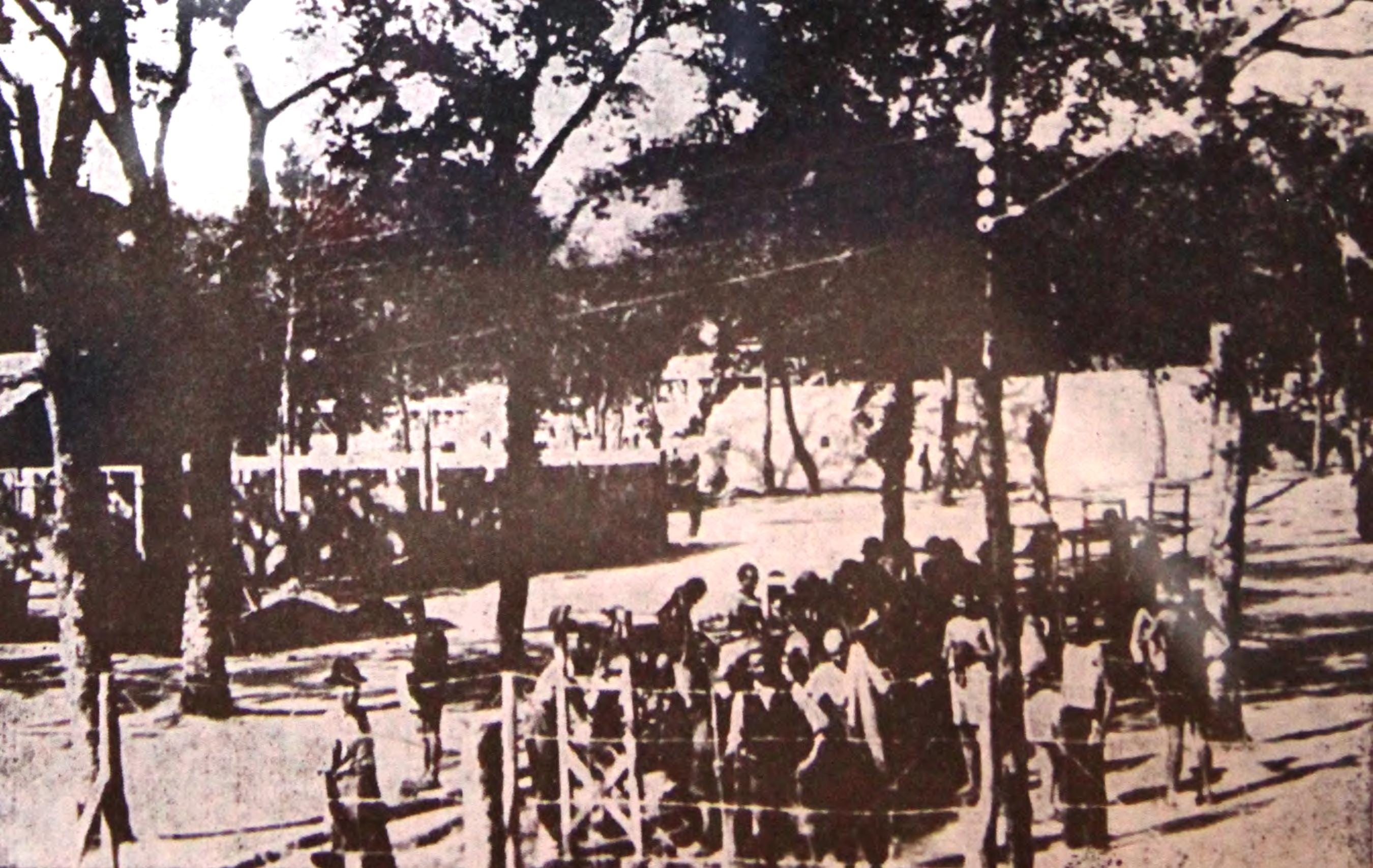
Renicci concentration camp

Renicci is a village in the municipality of Anghiari, which was the site of a fascist concentration camp for civilians from Yugoslavia, mostly rounded up by Italian troops in Slovenia and in particular in the then Province of Ljubljana. It is estimated that in eleven months of activity (from October 1942 to September 1943), the camp hosted about ten thousand prisoners, 159 of whom lost their lives because of the prohibitive conditions of detention. The remains of most of the victims are kept in the Shrine of the Slavs located within the Sansepolcro cemetery. After decades of neglect, recently in the area where the concentration camp lay, the Renicci Memorial Park was built, and annually hosts the celebrations for the Day of Remembrance.

== History ==
The first deportations to Renicci are dated 10 October 1942, while in December the prisoners were already over 3,800. Between July and August 1943, fascism fell and coincided with the arrival to Renicci of hundreds of political prisoners transferred from Ustica, Ventotene and Ponza. The camp underwent strikes and protests. Soldiers guarding the camp after September 8 deserted the camp in great numbers, fearing the arrival of the Germans. On 14 September 1943 the prisoners without supervision, fled, dispersing to the surrounding areas, almost all of them joining the partisans active in the Apennines between Tuscany and Marche. Among those who died fighting along with partisan forces were Anton Firman, Valentino and Marinko Bordon Dušan, Luka Pelovič, Stefano Recek and Carlo Zimperman. The fate of Jose Skuli and Alois Bukovac remains unknown.

== See also ==
- Holocaust in Italy
