= Mark Jenkinson =

British Conservative politician

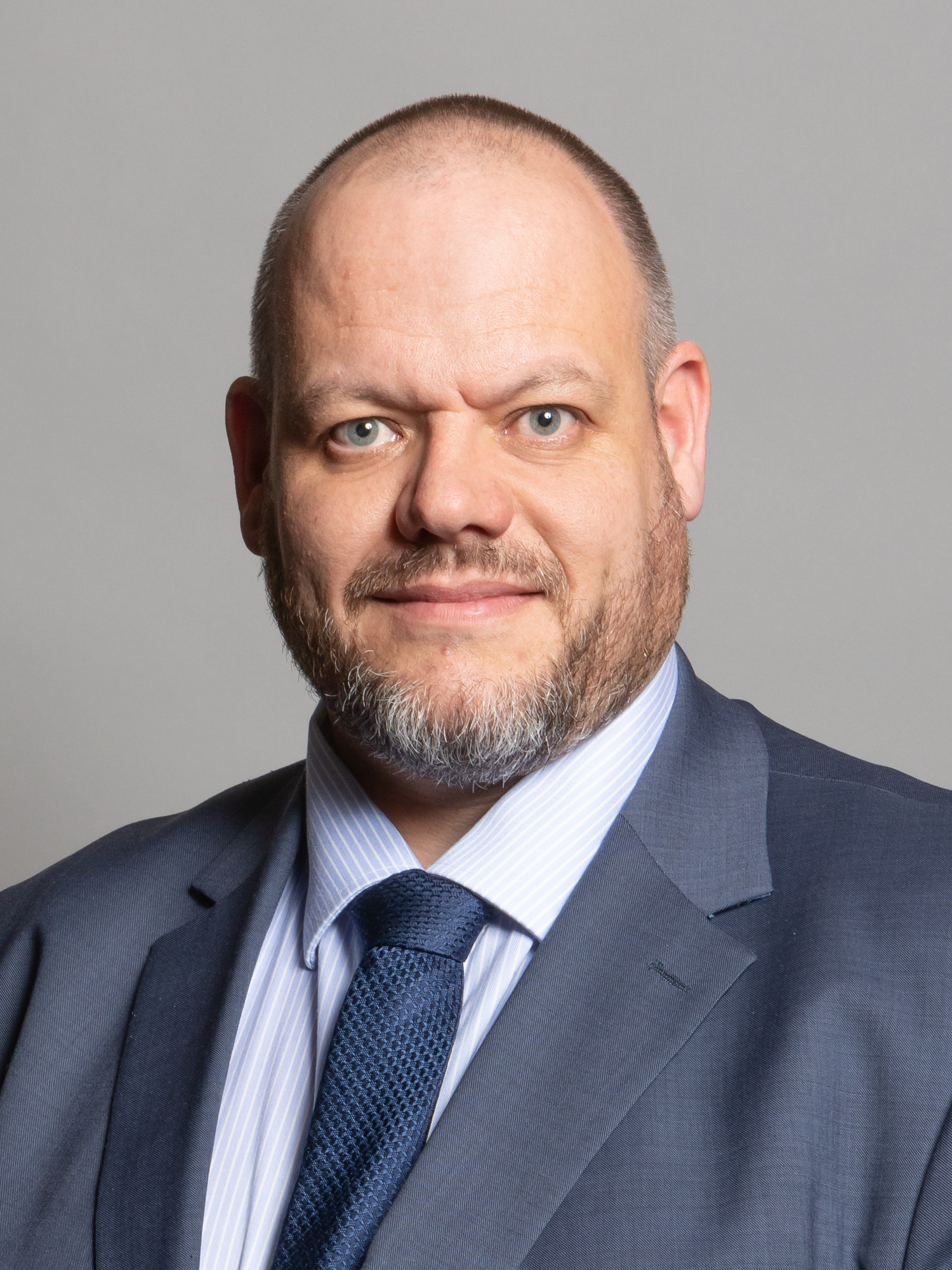
- Official portrait, 2020

Assistant Government Whip
- In office 14 November 2023 – 30 May 2024
- Prime Minister: Rishi Sunak
- In office 20 September 2022 – 27 October 2022
- Prime Minister: Liz Truss

Member of Parliament for Workington
- In office 12 December 2019 – 30 May 2024
- Preceded by: Sue Hayman
- Succeeded by: Constituency abolished

Personal details
- Born: 28 January 1982 (age 44) Whitehaven, Cumbria, England
- Party: Conservative (before 2012, 2016–)
- Other political affiliations: UKIP (2012-2016)
- Children: 4
- Occupation: Politician
- Website: www.mark-jenkinson.co.uk

Mark Ian Jenkinson (born 28 January 1982) is a British Conservative Party politician who served as the Member of Parliament (MP) for the abolished seat of Workington from 2019 to the 2024 general election. In the 2024 United Kingdom general election, he contested Penrith and Solway but was defeated by Labour candidate Markus Campbell-Savours.

== Early life and career ==
Mark Jenkinson was born in Whitehaven, Cumbria, and raised in Workington. He lived on Victoria Road in Workington during his childhood with his parents. Ian Jenkinson (Mark's father) worked as a refuse collector. Mark has a sister called Laura.

He was educated at St Joseph's Catholic High School, Workington and Newton Rigg College, Penrith, where he briefly pursued agricultural studies, and then joined British Steel as an apprentice for a period of months.

Prior to becoming an MP, he worked as a self-employed contractor in the nuclear supply chain.

== Political career ==
=== Parliamentary career ===
Jenkinson was the UK Independence Party candidate for Workington in 2015, coming third with 19.6% of the vote behind the Labour candidate Sue Hayman and the Conservative candidate. He was previously a member of the Conservative Party. Jenkinson was a founding member of UKIP's West Cumbria branch but quit in 2016, citing disagreements about the party's approach to the EU referendum and concerns over internal democracy.

After rejoining the Conservative Party, Jenkinson was elected in 2015 for the Seaton and Northside Ward of Allerdale Borough Council, where he became deputy leader in 2019. He was also chairman of Seaton Parish Council but stood down after being elected as MP.

Jenkinson was elected to the House of Commons at the 2019 general election, winning with 49.3% of the vote and a majority of 4,176. Following his victory, Brexit Party leader Nigel Farage congratulated Jenkinson on Twitter, writing "A personal congratulations to Mark Jenkinson. He was an excellent UKIP candidate in 2015." The constituency was seen as symbolic at the 2019 election, with a political think tank coining the term 'Workington Man' to represent the type of swing voter the Conservatives needed to win from Labour.

In October 2020, Jenkinson was criticised by Labour MP Jess Phillips after he stated that in his constituency in a "tiny" minority of cases "food parcels are sold or traded for drugs".

In 2021, Jenkinson came out in defence of a controversial proposal to build a new coal mine in the Copeland constituency. The plan to create Woodhouse Colliery was "called in" for government consideration, and The Guardian reported in March 2021 that Jenkinson was one of a number of Conservative backbench MPs on a potential collision course with the prime minister Boris Johnson when a decision was made to put it on hold. Eventually, Michael Gove, the Secretary of State for Levelling Up, Housing and Communities, approved the application in December 2022, although the decision was subject to legal challenges which were ongoing at the time of the 2024 United Kingdom general election.

=== Boundary changes ===
The Workington constituency was abolished and its territory split between Whitehaven and Workington and Penrith and Solway. On 4 February 2023, Jenkinson announced that he had been selected by Conservative Party members for Penrith and Solway, which was considered to be the safer of the two seats. In the event, none of the Cumbrian constituencies returned a Conservative candidate in the general election of 2024.

=== Select Committees ===
Jenkinson was elected to the Business, Energy and Industrial Strategy Select Committee in March 2020, serving until October 2022. He returned to the committee on 8 November 2022. In June 2023, changes were made to Select Committees to mirror the changes in departmental names and responsibilities. Jenkinson move to the new Energy Security and Net Zero Committee.

In December 2022, he joined the Women and Equalities Committee.

Jenkinson served as the Vice-Chair of the Conservative backbench Environment, Food and Rural Affairs (EFRA) committee; as a Vice-Chair of the All Party Parliamentary Group (APPG) on Upland Farming, a Vice-Chair of the APPG Nuclear and as Treasurer of the APPG Cyprus.

Jenkinson was one of 10 parliamentarians personally named in a Commons Select Committee of Privileges special report on the "Co-ordinated campaign of interference in the work of the Privileges Committee", published 28 June 2023. The report detailed how said parliamentarians "took it upon themselves to undermine procedures of the House of Commons" by putting pressure on the Commons Privileges Committee investigation into Boris Johnson. Jenkinson maintains that the tweet referenced in the report as evidence, was not about the committee.

=== Ministerial career ===
In February 2022, Jenkinson was made parliamentary private secretary for DEFRA, and from September 2022 to October 2022 he was an Assistant Government Whip.

He was made parliamentary private secretary to the Scotland Office in February 2023.

=== Views on transgender issues ===
Responding to Essex Police marking Transgender Day of Remembrance, Jenkinson questioned whether they had planning permission for the flag they were flying.

Writing on the website Conservative Home in November 2021, he said that erasing the notion of biological sex would cause harm to women and the "LGB community". He criticised the UK's gender recognition system and expressed concern that the proposed Gender Conversion Therapy Bill would see practitioners and parents who did not affirm their child's chosen gender convicted, writing that "we can't put male-bodied rapists in female prisons can we?"

Jenkinson has expressed his belief that transgender men are not men and transgender women are not women; in a 2022 tweet Jenkinson said "I don't get to call myself a chicken if I cover myself in feathers". In 2023, he criticised Scotland's gender recognition reforms, describing them as "terrifying".

== Post-parliamentary career ==
Following his defeat in the 2024 general election, Jenkinson founded management consultancy Redghyll Ltd. In September of that year, he was also employed by nuclear-industry engineering and construction company Nuvia as a technical author.

Jenkinson was one of three former MPs referred to the Cabinet Office in December 2024 for failure to correctly follow guidance from the Advisory Committee on Business Appointments issued to former government MPs seeking employment once they leave office.

== Personal life ==
Jenkinson is married to Dawn and has four children. They live in Seaton He is a former smoker and is teetotal.

Parliament of the United Kingdom
Preceded by Sue Hayman	Member of Parliament for Workington; 2019 – 2024	Constituency abolished
