= Simon Over =

- Genre: Classical
- Occupations: Pianist and Conductor
- Instruments: Piano and Organ

Simon Over MA FRCO is a British classical conductor, pianist, and music director. He attended King Henry VIII School in Coventry, UK. He subsequently studied at the Conservatorium van Amsterdam, the Royal Academy of Music and the University of Oxford (at Keble College).

== Career ==
From 1992 to 2002, Over was a member of the music staff of Westminster Abbey, and Director of Music at both St Margaret's Church and the Chapel of St Mary Undercroft in the Palace of Westminster. He is the Founder-Conductor of the UK Parliament Choir and has conducted all the choir's performances in conjunction with the City of London Sinfonia, La Serenissima, The London Festival Orchestra and Southbank Sinfonia.

Over has been music director of Southbank Sinfonia since its formation in 2002 and has conducted many concerts throughout the UK and Europe in concert halls such as St George's Chapel, Windsor Castle; St James's Palace; The Royal Opera House, Covent Garden; Westminster Abbey. He conducted Southbank Sinfonia in recordings with cellist Raphael Wallfisch and tenor Andrew Kennedy, and in 2009 and 2010, conducted the orchestra in a production of Every Good Boy Deserves Favour (Tom Stoppard/André Previn) at the Royal National Theatre.

In 2006, Over was appointed Conductor of the Malcolm Sargent Festival Choir and has been associated with the Samling Foundation in its work with young professional singers since its inception in 1996. Over is artistic director of the Music Festival in Anghiari (Tuscany), where he was recently made an Honorary Citizen. In 201,5 he was appointed Director of Music at St Clement Danes, the Central Church of the Royal Air Force, Westminster, London.

Further afield, he has conducted the City Chamber Orchestra of Hong Kong and the Dunedin Symphony Orchestra (New Zealand). He has worked with many internationally acclaimed musicians, including Sir Thomas Allen, Emma Kirkby, Dame Felicity Lott, Alessio Bax, Malcolm Martineau, Emma Johnson, and Sir James and Lady Galway.

As a pianist, he performed with American violinist Miriam Kramer at the Wigmore Hallin London and Lincoln Center, New York – as well as on several recordings – have received high critical acclaim.

== Discography ==
- BLOCH: Violin Sonatas Nos. 1 and 2 Suite Hebraique with Miriam Kramer
