= Alan Boothe =

American politician

Member of the Alabama House of Representatives from the 89th district
- In office 1998 – November 2018
- Succeeded by: Wes Allen

Personal details
- Born: November 14, 1945 (age 80) Opp, Alabama, United States
- Party: Republican (Nov.2010–present)
- Other political affiliations: Democratic (?–Nov.2010)

Alan C. Boothe (born November 14, 1945) is an American politician. He was a member of the Alabama House of Representatives from the 89th District from 1998 to 2018. He is a member of the Republican Party.
