= Wes Allen =

American politician (born 1975)

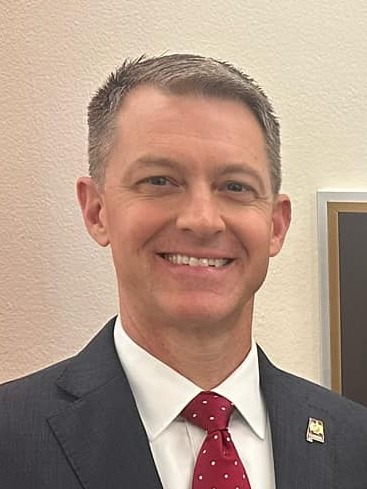
- Allen in 2023

54th Secretary of State of Alabama
- Incumbent
- Assumed office January 16, 2023
- Governor: Kay Ivey
- Preceded by: John Merrill

Member of the Alabama House of Representatives from the 89th district
- In office November 7, 2018 – November 10, 2022
- Preceded by: Alan Boothe
- Succeeded by: Marcus Paramore

Personal details
- Born: Wesley Harrison Allen; August 15, 1975 (age 51) Tuscaloosa, Alabama, U.S.
- Party: Republican
- Children: 2
- Parent: Gerald Allen (father)
- Education: University of Alabama (BA); Troy University (MA)

Wesley Harrison Allen (born August 15, 1975) is an American politician and former probate judge who is the incumbent secretary of state of Alabama, serving since 2023. A Republican, he was previously a member of the Alabama House of Representatives, representing the 89th district from 2018 to 2022, and was elected as Secretary of State in 2022.

In February 2025, he announced his candidacy for Alabama Lieutenant Governor in the 2026 Republican primary. He was defeated in the primary.

== Early life and education ==
Allen was born on August 15, 1975, in Tuscaloosa, Alabama. Allen earned a bachelor's degree from the University of Alabama and a master's degree from Troy University. As an undergraduate, Allen played on the Alabama Crimson Tide football team under coaches Mike DuBose and Gene Stallings.

== Early political activities ==
In 2009, Allen was appointed to serve as a probate judge of Pike County, Alabama by then-Governor Bob Riley. Allen won election to a full term as a judge in 2012. In 2018, Allen was elected to the Alabama House of Representatives, succeeding Alan Boothe.

== Alabama Secretary of State ==
On May 5, 2021, Allen announced his candidacy for secretary of state of Alabama in the 2022 election. Allen came in second out of a field of four candidates in the Republican primary on May 24, 2022, forcing a runoff election with State Auditor Jim Zeigler. The runoff election was held on June 21, 2022, and Allen defeated Zeigler with the largest percentage margin of victory of any Republican primary race held in Alabama on that date, earning 64% of the votes cast. Allen went on to win the general election against Democratic nominee Pamela Lafitte and Libertarian nominee Jason "Matt" Shelby, with Allen attaining 65% of the vote.

== Political positions ==
=== Election security ===
As a member of the Alabama House of Representatives, Allen served as the vice-chair of the Constitution, Campaigns and Elections Committee. As a member of that committee, Allen played a role in determining which bills would make it to the floor of the House to be debated by the full body and which bills would be voted down during the committee process. During the 2021 legislative session, Allen sponsored and passed a bill to ban curbside voting in Alabama. That bill was signed into law by Governor Kay Ivey on May 26, 2021. In 2022, Allen sponsored and passed HD89, commonly referred to in the media as the "Zuckerbucks" bill. The legislation, signed into law by Governor Ivey, prohibits state and local election officials from accepting private donations to fund election-related expenses. The bill was passed in response to reports in the 2020 election that Mark Zuckerberg, founder of Facebook, directed some $350 million in donations, or "Zuckerbucks," to more than 2,500 election officials throughout the country.

Allen has supported legislative efforts including banning ballot harvesting, banning ranked-choice voting, requiring only paper ballots be used in Alabama elections, and requiring that no election tabulators in Alabama will be or can be connected to the internet. He strongly opposes ballot drop boxes and mass mail voting.

=== Electronic Registration Information Center ===
Allen vowed that, if elected, his first act as secretary of state would be to withdraw Alabama from membership in the Electronic Registration Information Center, also known as ERIC. Allen said that the $25,000 membership fee was a waste of taxpayer dollars and that Alabamians would not agree to their information being used by ERIC to maintain accurate voter rolls. Allen also had concerns over ERIC being connected to organizations funded by George Soros. Additionally, Allen visited the official ERIC headquarters in Washington, DC, in 2023 and found that it was empty.

A week after his victory in the 2022 Alabama Secretary of State general election, Allen sent a letter to ERIC informing the organization that Alabama would withdraw from participating in the program immediately upon his inauguration on January 16, 2023. Alabama's withdrawal from ERIC became official on that day, following Allen's inauguration as Allen signed a letter to ERIC notifying them of his withdrawal minutes after being sworn in.

In September 2023, Allen introduced the Alabama Voter Integrity Database (AVID), a new Alabama-based system to maintain clean and accurate voter lists in Alabama.

=== Congressional redistricting ===
As Secretary of State, Allen was the defendant in one of a series of redistricting cases across the country, Allen v. Milligan. Although the Supreme Court originally ruled against Alabama in 2023, Allen continued the legal battle, leading to a victory after the 2026 landmark Louisiana v. Callais decision. Shortly after the Callais decision was released, Allen filed a motion with the Supreme Court to reconsider their Milligan decision. The Supreme Court ultimately ruled in favor of Allen and Alabama, vacating the lower court's injunction and allowing Alabama to use the legislature-drawn congressional maps.

=== Second Amendment ===
Allen is a vocal supporter of the 2nd amendment. Allen voted for and co-sponsored Alabama's constitutional carry legislation which was signed into law in 2022.

=== Transgender rights ===
Allen sponsored the Alabama Vulnerable Child Protection Act, which prohibits doctors from administering puberty blockers to children in Alabama for the purpose of changing their sex. It also bans sex change surgeries from being performed on minors in the state. The bill was passed and signed into law by Governor Kay Ivey in 2022.

=== Abortion ===
Allen believes that life begins at conception and has been vocal about his anti-abortion stance. He voted for and co-sponsored one of the most restrictive anti-abortion laws in the country, the Human Life Protection Act, which was signed into law in 2019. The law was initially held up by an injunction in federal court but that injunction was lifted after the United States Supreme Court overturned Roe v. Wade and the Human Life Protection Act became law.

=== 2026 lieutenant gubernatorial primary ===
In February 2025, Allen launched his bid for Alabama lieutenant governor in the 2026 Alabama lieutenant gubernatorial election.

== Personal life ==
Allen's father, Gerald Allen, has been a member of the Alabama Legislature since 1994. Allen and his wife, Cae, have two children and live in Troy, Alabama.

Party political offices
Preceded by John Merrill	Republican nominee for Secretary of State of Alabama; 2022	Succeeded by Caroleene Dobson
Political offices
Preceded by John Merrill	Secretary of State of Alabama; 2023–present	Incumbent
