= Sue Hayman =

British Labour politician (born 1962)

The Right Honourable The Baroness Hayman of Ullock
- Parliamentary portrait, 2026

Parliamentary Under-Secretary of State for Biosecurity, Borders and Animals
- Incumbent
- Assumed office 9 July 2024
- Prime Minister: Keir Starmer; Andy Burnham
- Preceded by: Office established
Shadow portfolios
Shadow Spokesperson
2020–2024	Environment, Food and Rural Affairs
2021–2023	Levelling Up, Housing and Communities
Shadow Secretary of State
2017–2019	Environment, Food and Rural Affairs
Shadow Minister
2016–2017	Flooding and Coastal Communities

Member of the House of Lords
- Lord Temporal
- Life peerage 9 September 2020

Member of Parliament for Workington
- In office 7 May 2015 – 6 November 2019
- Preceded by: Tony Cunningham
- Succeeded by: Mark Jenkinson

Personal details
- Born: Susan Mary Bentley; 28 July 1962 (age 64) Upper Bucklebury, Berkshire, England
- Party: Labour
- Spouse: Ross Hayman (m. 1997)
- Children: 4
- Education: Anglia Ruskin University

Susan Mary Hayman, Baroness Hayman of Ullock (née Bentley; born 28 July 1962) is a British politician and life peer who has served as Parliamentary Under-Secretary of State for Environment, Food and Rural Affairs since July 2024. A member of the Labour Party, she was Member of Parliament (MP) for Workington from 2015 to 2019. Hayman served as an Opposition Whip from 2015 to 2016 and Shadow Minister for Flooding and Coastal Communities from 2016 to 2017, then as Shadow Secretary of State for Environment, Food and Rural Affairs from 2017 to 2019 and was appointed to the House of Lords in 2020.

She was a Shadow Spokesperson for Environment, Food and Rural Affairs and an Opposition Whip from 2020, and a Shadow Spokesperson for Levelling Up, Housing and Communities from 2021.

== Early life and career ==
Susan Mary Bentley was born on 28 July 1962 in Upper Bucklebury, Berkshire to John and Rita Bentley. She attended St Bartholomew's School in Newbury, and studied English literature at Anglia Ruskin University.

Her first job was working in a bookshop. She has also worked in social services. From 1997 to 2001, she worked as the office manager for MP Tess Kingham in Gloucester. She then worked as campaigns and communication manager for MP Mike Foster. Hayman worked in public relations as a consultant for Copper Consultancy where she was account director before becoming their head of public affairs. She then became a self-employed consultant.

== Political career ==
Hayman was third on Labour's party list for West Midlands in the 2004 European Parliament election but was not elected as an MEP. She stood as a candidate in the 2005 general election for Preseli Pembrokeshire after the incumbent Labour MP, Jackie Lawrence, stood down. Hayman lost to Conservative Stephen Crabb. In the 2010 general election, she contested Halesowen and Rowley Regis. The constituency had been represented by Labour MP Sylvia Heal since 1997. Hayman lost the seat to Conservative James Morris.

Hayman was elected to represent Howgate division on Cumbria County Council in 2013, on which she later became vice-chair of the Children's Scrutiny Committee. She resigned her seat shortly after her election to Parliament in 2015.

=== House of Commons ===
She was elected as MP for the all women shortlist seat of Workington in the 2015 general election, she became the first female MP to represent a constituency in Cumbria. From July to October 2015, she sat on the Justice Select Committee. Hayman was an opposition whip from September 2015 to October 2016. She campaigned against the closure of Workington's magistrates court. In February 2016, the Ministry of Justice announced that the court would not be closed.

She supported Owen Smith in the failed attempt to replace Jeremy Corbyn in the 2016 Labour leadership election. Following Corbyn's re-election as Labour leader, she was appointed to the new Shadow Minister for Flooding and Coastal Communities post in October 2016. In February 2017, she was promoted to Shadow Secretary of State for Environment, Food and Rural Affairs after Rachael Maskell's resignation.

Hayman retained her seat in the June 2017 general election with a majority of 3,925 (9.4%). During the election, the Conservative Party candidate claimed Hayman had breached election rules over mail sent to constituents. However, a complaint sent to the Serjeant-at-Arms of the House of Commons was not investigated because the mailing, to flood victims, was unrelated to the election and Hayman had notified it to Parliament once the election was called.

She was co-chair of the All Party Parliamentary Group on Nuclear Energy, and vice-chair of the All Party Parliamentary Group on Rural Business. Since 2017, she has written articles on the environment and animal welfare in the New Statesman.

Hayman supported the United Kingdom (UK) remaining within the European Union (EU) in the 2016 UK EU membership referendum. In the indicative votes on 27 March, she voted for a referendum on a Brexit withdrawal agreement, for the Norway-plus model and for a customs union with the EU.

Hayman lost her seat at the 2019 general election to Mark Jenkinson of the Conservatives.

=== House of Lords ===
In July 2020, it was announced that Hayman received a nomination for a peerage. She was created Baroness Hayman of Ullock, of Ullock in the County of Cumbria, on 9 September 2020. Due to her view on animal welfare, she chose to wear faux fur robes to take her oath of allegiance. She was appointed as a shadow DEFRA spokesperson and an opposition whip in October 2020, and a shadow DLUHC spokesperson in December 2021.

== Personal life ==
She married Ross Hayman in 1997. They have two daughters and two sons. They live in the village of Ullock in Cumbria.

A keen chorister, Hayman sang in the Parliament Choir and was its chair.

Hayman is Vice President of local charity Hospice at Home Cumbria. She has been Chair of the Royal School of Church Music from May 2024.

Parliament of the United Kingdom
Preceded by Tony Cunningham	Member of Parliament for Workington; 2015–2019	Succeeded by Mark Jenkinson
Political offices
Preceded by Rachael Maskell	Shadow Secretary of State for Environment, Food and Rural Affairs; 2017–present	Incumbent
