= Sinfonia Smith Square =

British arts organisation

- Orchestra
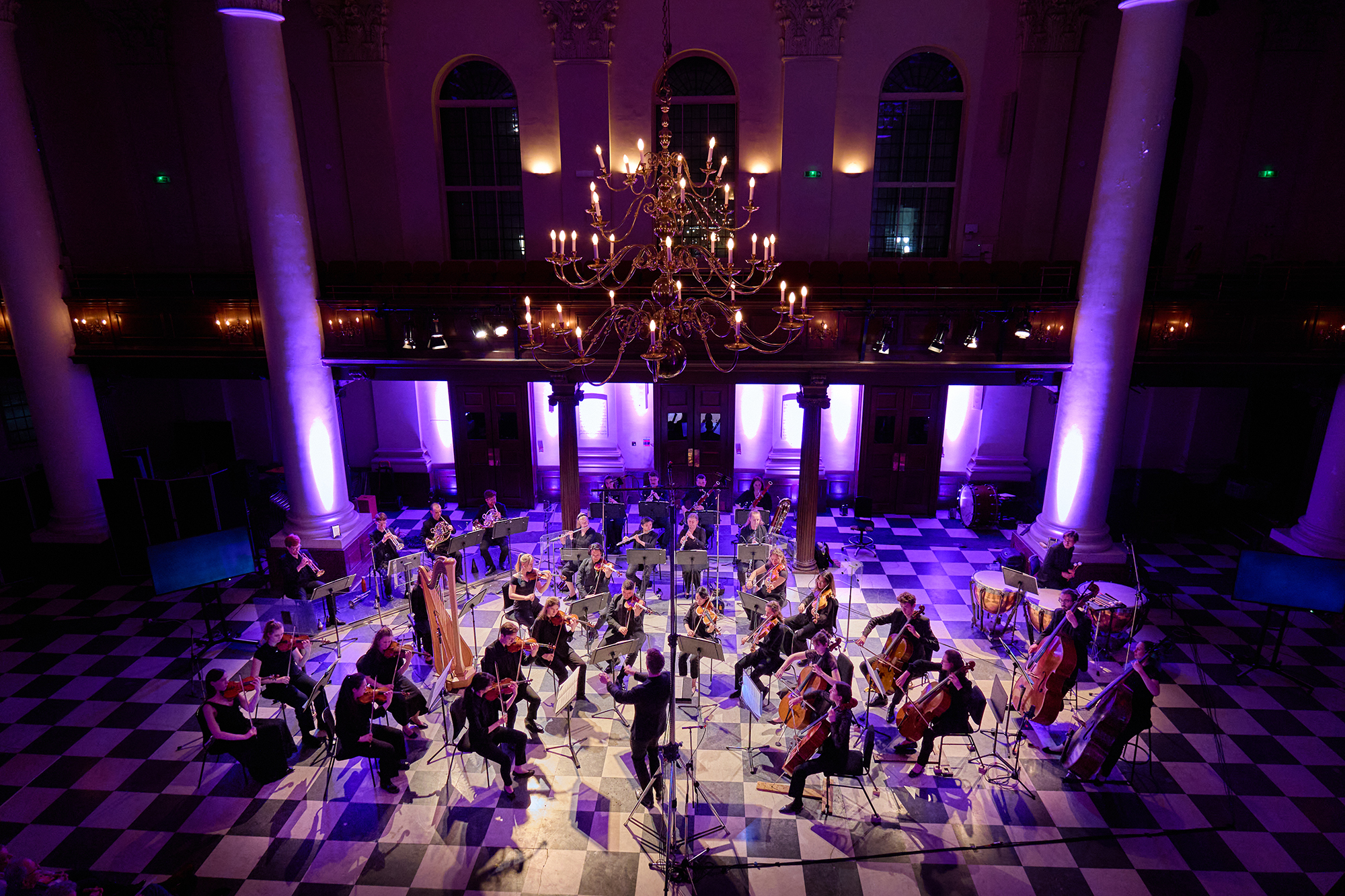
- The 2023/24 Sinfonia Smith Square Fellowship playing inside Smith Square Hall
- Founded: 2002
- Location: London, England
- Principal conductor: Simon Over
- Website: sinfoniasmithsq.org.uk

Sinfonia Smith Square (formerly Southbank Sinfonia) is an arts organisation and orchestra formed out of the merger of Southbank Sinfonia and St John's Smith Square. The organisation primarily comprises a venue, Smith Square Hall, and a youth orchestra.

The Sinfonia Smith Square orchestra comprises 34 graduate musicians, who are unpaid but receive a bursary to participate. Musicians are involved roughly 3 days a week for a 40-week period. The orchestra collaborates with other artists and groups, including productions of Amadeus and Every Good Boy Deserves Favour at the National Theatre.

On 14 May 2023 the orchestra made an appearance in a YouTube video made by Max Fosh, where he played the triangle during one of their performances of Finlandia.

The orchestra was shortlisted for a Royal Philharmonic Society Award for Ensemble in 2016 and in the Concert Series and Festivals category in 2017. Sinfonia Smith Square runs and promotes a festival held in the town of Anghiari (Tuscany, Italy) each July.

Sinfonia Smith Square's patron is Queen Camilla.

== History ==
Southbank Sinfonia was founded in 2002 by Simon Over (now Sinfonia Smith Square) Michael Berman CBE, and Katharine Verney.
