= Hugh Merrill =

American artist

Hugh Merrill was an American artist, recognized internationally in the contemporary printmaking community. He has written articles on the redefinition of art, printmaking, and education and has taught and lectured on printmaking at over 75 universities, colleges, and schools worldwide.

== Biography ==
Born in 1949, Hugh Merrill was raised in Washington, D.C. and Alabama. His grandfather, Hugh Davis Merrill, was a state judge and Lieutenant Governor of Alabama. His father worked with the Democratic Party, advising Kennedy, Humphrey and Johnson on agricultural issues. Merrill began his artistic career in 1969 at the Maryland Institute College of Art (MICA). Within his first year, Merrill flunked out and ended up in Washington D.C., working in the offices of Alabama senator John Sparkman. The following year he returned to MICA, where he discovered printmaking, specifically etching, a medium that would become his primary means of expression for the next four decades. Despite continued academic difficulties, Merrill completed his undergraduate work and was accepted to Yale School of Art. There, he studied with John Cage, Gabor Pederti, William Bailey, Alex Katz, Robert Motherwell, Al Held and others, all of whom would have a profound impact on his thinking and work. After receiving his MFA from Yale in 1975, Merrill taught at Wheaton College (Massachusetts) before being hired to teach printmaking at the Kansas City Art Institute (KCAI) in 1976, where he has been teaching since.

In the 1970s, Hugh Merrill began working on etchings of the urban environment, which he termed “real-estatescapes,” a phrase meant to represent the dominance of society over nature. In the 1980s Merrill focused on sequential etching suites, such as Lucky Dragon, exhibited at the Nelson-Atkins Museum of Art in 1985, and Rosa Luxemburg, exhibited at Printworks Gallery in Chicago. As noted by Nelson-Atkins print curator George L. McKenna, these prints "[dealt] imaginatively with the confrontation between man-made construction and natural landscape," through drawing, etching, printing, and reworking of the etching plates.

During the 1990s, Hugh Merrill became concerned that his prints and studio work were not having the direct impact on society that he had been striving for and began to look at the writings of Lucy Lippard, Suzanne Lacy, Suzi Gablic and the work of Tim Rollins and K.O.S. He returned from a trip to Poland, photographing and doing drawings in Kraków and Auschwitz, determined to balance his studio vision with community arts actions.

In 1996, Merrill worked with the Kemper Museum of Contemporary Art as a visiting artist for the Christian Boltanski exhibition, So Far. He and Boltanski collaborated on the citywide community artwork Our City Ourselves. With the help of designer Bruce McIntosh, Merrill created a tabloid publication insert in the Sunday Kansas City Star inviting the public to bring their family photographs and personal archives to the museum where they could pin them to the walls. In conjunction with the exhibit, Merrill also created Portrait of Self, an arts and educational archive of drawing, writing, photography, and other art forms to help young people discuss the many influences on their sense of sense. Since its creation, Merrill has gone on to use Portrait of Self in community arts projects in Dana Beach, Florida; Sydney, Australia; Dublin, Ireland, as well as Colorado Springs, CO; Pittsburgh, PA; Portland, OR; and a number of other cities nationwide. Building on these experiences, Merrill helped transform Chameleon Theatre, a small not-for-profit whose mission was to create dramatic plays about youth experience, into the broader Chameleon Arts and Youth Development agency that utilizes theater, Hip Hop, visual arts, and dance to transform the lives of homeless and at-risk youth.

In 2005, he was invited to produce a community arts action for the Impact Conference in Berlin, Germany and Poznan, Poland. The project, Pools of Belief, consisted of graphics of children's swimming pools laid out in a public square and filled with images of mousetraps shaped like boats. Trailing from the traps were narrow sheets of paper with the text “I believe in the New York Stock Exchange” and other statements. The public was asked to participate by writing their own answers to the phrase “I believe in ________” on a narrow sheet of paper, which they then attached to the work. Pools of Belief has gone on to be exhibited at the Dalarnas Museum for the Falun Print Triennial in Falun, Sweden and other museums around the world.

Most recently Merrill has worked with Staci Pratt, director of the Office of Homeless Liaison, Kansas City, KS Public Schools to facilitate a number of community arts projects, including Faces of the Homeless. Faces was a collaboration with Patrick Moonasar and Matt Hilger which produced a series of posters of homeless children showing not their need but their value. The posters have been exhibited nationally including the 2008 conference for the National Association for the Education of Homeless Children and Youth in Washington, D.C. In addition, Hugh Merrill has been invited on Kansas City Medical Missions trips to the Philippines, Guatemala and Cuba, and has worked with Soulfari to build an orphanage in Kenya. He serves on the board of United Inner City Service and is on the steering committee of Inkubator Press at the Arts Incubator.

Hugh Merrill has been a speaker at numerous conferences, including the College Art Association and The Southern Graphics Council, of which he was president in the early 1990s. In 1991, he served as a conference co-chair for The Southern Graphics Council conference at the Kansas City Art Institute. He has been awarded a number of grants, including a regional National Endowment for the Arts grant, Mellon Foundation, a Yaddo Fellowship, and the Teaching Excellent in Printmaking Award at The Southern Graphics Council conference in 2007. His artwork has been exhibited internationally and his work has been collected by major museums, such as the Museum of Modern Art, the Daum Museum of Contemporary Art, the Harvard Art Museum, the Cranbrook Art Museum, the Minneapolis Institute of Arts, and the Nelson-Atkins Museum of Art, among others. In 2008 he was invited by the Nelson-Atkins Museum to curate the print exhibition, Print Lovers at Thirty, in recognition of the Nelson Print Society and the contribution of George L. McKenna, long time print curator for the museum.

Hugh Merrill began writing for publication in 2011, producing two books of poetry, a book of short story recollections, and books on art, printmaking and social practice. He has written Divergent Consistencies: 40 Years of Studio and Community Artwork, Shared Visions: Thoughts and Experiences in Social Arts Practice, and Preaching to the Choir: Thoughts on Contemporary Printmaking. His debut book of poetry, Nomadic? Rover by Days Singing These Gang Plank Songs of the Ambler, was published in 2016 by 39 West Press. Dog Alley was edited by Jeanette Powers and published by Stubborn Mule Press. And his graphic zine, Whiteout, based on his own experiences growing up in a family of privilege and political power, was self-published in 2018.
