= Nicholas O'Neill (composer) =

- Born: 1 April 1970 (age 56); Cheltenham
- Genres: Classical
- Occupations: Composer, organist
- Instrument: Organ
- Website: www.nicholasoneill.com

Nicholas O'Neill (born 1 April 1970) is an English composer, arranger, organist and choral director.

== Biography ==
O'Neill attended The King's School, Gloucester, and was a chorister at Gloucester Cathedral under the direction of John Sanders. O'Neill went on to study music at Magdalen College, Oxford, where he was Organ Scholar, first under John Harper and then under Grayston "Bill" Ives.

O'Neill holds the posts of Composer in Residence to the Parliament Choir and to the Academy of Saint Cecilia. He is also President of Cantores Salicium, and associate director of Music at St. Mary Abbots Church, Kensington. He was Organist of St. George's Cathedral, Southwark, until the end of 2010 and was Chorus Master to the Malcolm Sargent Festival Choir for a decade.

His music has been performed and broadcast internationally, his Missa Sancti Nicolai being chosen as the Mass setting for the BBC1 live television broadcast of Midnight Mass in 2011. His Christmas carol Sweet Was The Song was recorded by the BBC Singers in 2011 and featured in their Carols For Breakfast series, and his arrangement of This Joyful Eastertide featured as the Anthem on BBC Radio 4's The Daily Service in 2013 with the Choir of Exeter College, Oxford. He was subsequently invited to compose Flyht for Exeter College's 700th anniversary celebrations. Flyht was recorded by the college choir and released on EM Records. Other notable works include From Damascus for the London Oratory School Schola, Mermaid for Surrey Arts, Why Should We Not Sing? for the Lloyd George Society., and against the pull of silence for string orchestra.

== Awards ==
In the summer of 1992 his Magnificat and Nunc Dimittis on E was unanimously awarded first prize in the Norwich International Festival of Contemporary Church Music Composition Competition. In the following year his Quartet In Three Movements won the Gregynog Young Composers' Award, and his Ave Verum shared the Schola Cantorum's International Composition Competition Award in 1994.

His Festive Voluntary was awarded the 2012 American Guild of Organists Marilyn Mason Award for Organ Composition, in 2019 he won the commission competition for the 50th Anniversary Mayfield Festival, writing his Cantata Of Saint Dunstan, and his Magnificat and Nunc Dimittis on Bb was awarded the Saint Fin Barre Cathedral, Cork Composition Prize early in 2020.
