= NAACP Legal Defense and Educational Fund =

Organization in New York, United States

NAACP Legal Defense and Educational Fund, Inc.
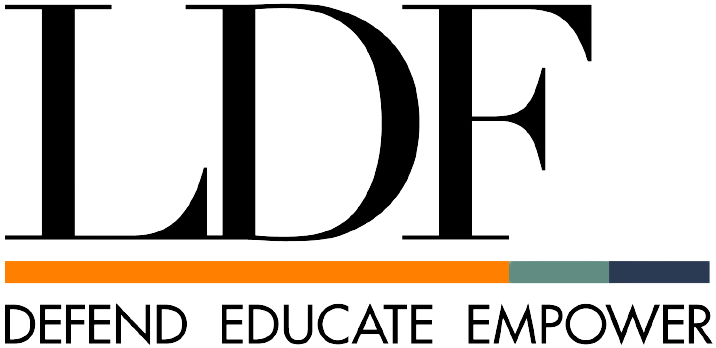
- Abbreviation: LDF
- Formation: February 12, 1940; 86 years ago
- Type: Non-profit organization
- Headquarters: 40 Rector Street, 5th floor New York City, New York, 10006 U.S.
- Region served: United States
- President and Director-Counsel: Janai Nelson
- Website: www.naacpldf.org

The NAACP Legal Defense and Educational Fund, Inc. (NAACP LDF, the Legal Defense Fund, or LDF) is an American civil rights organization and law firm based in New York City.

LDF is wholly independent and separate from the NAACP. Although LDF can trace its origins to the legal department of the NAACP created by Charles Hamilton Houston in the 1930s, Thurgood Marshall founded LDF as a separate legal entity in 1940, which became totally independent from the NAACP in 1957.

Janai Nelson serves as the eighth President and Director-Counsel, since March 2022. Previous Director-Counsels include Sherrilyn Ifill (2012–2022), John Payton (2008–2012), Ted Shaw (2004–2008), Elaine Jones (1993–2004), Julius Levonne Chambers (1984–1993), Jack Greenberg (1961–1984), and founder Thurgood Marshall (1940–1961).

== Overview ==
While primarily focused on the civil rights of African Americans in the U.S., LDF states it has "been instrumental in the formation of similar organizations that have replicated its organizational model in order to promote equality for Asian-Americans, Latinos, and women in the United States." LDF has also been involved in "the campaign for human rights throughout the world, including in South Africa, Canada, Brazil, and elsewhere."

LDF's national office is in Manhattan, with regional offices in Washington, D.C. and Atlanta, G.A. LDF has over 70 staff attorneys and hundreds of cooperating attorneys across the nation.

=== Areas of activity ===
- Litigation
- Advocacy
- Educational outreach
- Policy research and monitoring legislation
- Coalition-building
- Provides scholarships for exceptional African-American students.

=== Areas of concern ===
- Education
  - Affirmative action
  - Desegregation
- Political Participation
  - Voting rights
  - Felony disfranchisement
- Economic access
  - Employment discrimination
  - Environmental justice
  - Fair housing
- Criminal justice
  - Opposition to the death penalty
  - Fourth Amendment
  - Sixth Amendment

== Creation and separation from the NAACP ==
The board of directors of the NAACP created the Legal Defense Fund in 1940 specifically for tax purposes. In 1957, LDF was completely separated from the NAACP and given its own independent board and staff. Although LDF was originally meant to operate in accordance with NAACP policy, after 1961, serious disputes emerged between the two organizations. These disputes ultimately led the NAACP to create its own internal legal department while LDF continued to operate and score significant legal victories as an independent organization.

At times, this separation has created considerable confusion in the eyes and minds of the public. In the 1980s, the NAACP unsuccessfully sued LDF for trademark infringement. In its ruling rejecting the NAACP's lawsuit, the U.S. Court of Appeals for the D.C. Circuit recognized that the "universal esteem in which the [NAACP] initials are held is due in significant measure to [LDF's] distinguished record as a civil rights litigator" and that the NAACP has "benefitted from the added luster given to the NAACP initials by the LDF's litigation successes."

== Well-known cases ==
Probably the most famous case in the history of LDF was Brown v. Board of Education, the landmark case in 1954 in which the United States Supreme Court explicitly outlawed de jure racial segregation of public education facilities. During the civil rights protests of the 1960s, LDF represented "the legal arm of the civil rights movement" and provided counsel for Dr. Martin Luther King Jr., among others.

=== 1930s ===
- 1935 Murray v. Pearson, removed unconstitutional color bar from the University of Maryland School of Law admission policy. (Managed by Thurgood Marshall for the NAACP before the formal foundation of LDF.)
- 1938: Missouri ex rel. Gaines v. Canada, invalidated state laws that denied African-American students access to all-white state graduate schools when no separate state graduate schools were available for African Americans. (Handled by Thurgood Marshall for the NAACP before the formal foundation of LDF.)

=== 1940s ===
- 1940: Abbington v Board of Education of Louisville (KY), a suit argued by Thurgood Marshall and dropped though the settlement led to the removal of a 15 percent salary discrepancy between black and white teachers in the Louisville, Kentucky public schools (see NAACP in Kentucky).
- 1940: Alston v. School Board of City of Norfolk, a federal court order that African-American public school teachers be paid salaries equal to whites, regardless of race.
- 1940: Chambers v. Florida, overturned the convictions—based on coerced confessions—of four young black defendants accused of murdering an elderly white man.
- 1944: Smith v. Allwright, a voting rights case in which the Supreme Court required Texas to allow African Americans to vote in primary elections, formerly restricted to whites.
- 1946: Morgan v. Virginia, desegregated seating on interstate buses.
- 1947: Patton v. Mississippi, ruled against strategies that excluded African Americans from criminal juries.
- 1948: Shelley v. Kraemer, overturned racially discriminatory real estate covenants.
- 1948: Sipuel v. Board of Regents of Univ. of Okla., reaffirmed and extended Missouri ex rel. Gaines v. Canada, ruling that Oklahoma could not bar an African-American student from its all-white law school on the ground that she had not requested the state to provide a separate law school for black students.

=== 1950s ===
- 1950: McLaurin v. Oklahoma State Regents, ruled against practices of segregation within a formerly all-white graduate school insofar as they interfered with meaningful classroom instruction and interaction with other students.
- 1950: Sweatt v. Painter, ruled against a Texas attempt to circumvent Missouri ex rel. Gaines v. Canada with a hastily established inferior law school for black students.
- 1953: Barrows v. Jackson, reaffirmed Shelley v. Kraemer, preventing state courts from enforcing restrictive covenants.
- 1954: Brown v. Board of Education, explicitly outlawed de jure racial segregation of public education facilities.
- 1956: Jackson v. Rawdon, required desegregation of Mansfield High School, outside Fort Worth, Texas; see also Mansfield school desegregation incident.
- 1956: Browder v. Gayle, overturned segregation of city buses; see also Montgomery bus boycott.
- 1957: Fikes v. Alabama, a further ruling against forced confessions.
- 1958: Cooper v. Aaron barred Arkansas Governor Orval Faubus from interfering with the desegregation of Little Rock's Central High School; see also Little Rock Nine.

=== 1960s ===
- 1961: Holmes v. Danner, began the desegregation of the University of Georgia.
- 1962: Meredith v. Fair, won James Meredith admission to the University of Mississippi.
- 1963: LDF attorneys defended Martin Luther King Jr. against contempt charges for demonstrating without a permit in Birmingham, Alabama. See Letter from Birmingham Jail.
- 1963: Watson v. City of Memphis, ruled segregation of public parks unconstitutional.
- 1963: Simkins v. Moses H. Cone Memorial Hospital, ended segregation of hospitals that received Federal construction funds.
- 1964: Willis v. Pickrick Restaurant, ruled against segregation in public facilities such as restaurants; Lester Maddox closed his restaurant rather than integrate.
- 1964: McLaughlin v. Florida, ruled against anti-miscegenation laws. See also on this issue, Eilers v. Eilers (argued by James A. Crumlin, Sr.) – details in NAACP in Kentucky.
- 1965: Williams v. Wallace, made court order to allow a voting-rights march in Alabama, led by Dr. Martin Luther King Jr., which had previously been stopped twice by state police.
- 1965: Hamm v. City of Rock Hill, overturned all convictions of demonstrators' participating in civil rights sit-ins.
- 1965: Abernathy v. Alabama and Thomas v. Mississippi, reversed state convictions of Alabama and Mississippi Freedom Riders on the basis of Boynton v. Virginia.
- 1967: Quarles v. Philip Morris, overturned the practice of "departmental seniority", which had forced non-white workers to give up their seniority rights when they transferred to better jobs in previously white-only departments.
- 1967: Green v. County School Board of New Kent County, ruled that "freedom of choice" was an insufficient response to segregated schools.
- 1967: Loving v. Virginia, ruled that state laws banning interracial marriage ("anti-miscegenation laws") in Virginia and 15 other states were unconstitutional because they violated the Fourteenth Amendment to the United States Constitution.
- 1968: Newman v. Piggie Park, established that prevailing plaintiffs in civil rights act cases are entitled to receive attorneys' fees from the losing defendant.
- 1969: Alexander v. Holmes County Board of Education, ruled that 33 Mississippi school districts must desegregate "at once" thereby ending the era of foot-dragging in school desegregation permitted under the "all deliberate speed" doctrine of Brown v. Board of Education
- 1969: Shuttlesworth v. Birmingham, ruled against using the parade permitting process as a means of suppressing First Amendment rights.
- 1969: Thorpe v. Housing Authority of Durham, ruled that low-income public housing tenants could not be summarily evicted.
- 1969: Sniadach v. Family Finance Corp., required due process for the garnishment of wages.
- 1969: Allen v. State Board of Elections, guaranteed the right to a write-in vote.

=== 1970s ===
- 1970: Ali v. The Division of State Athletic Commission, restored Muhammad Ali's boxing license.
- 1970: Carter v. Jury Commission, approved Federal suits over discrimination in the selection of juries.
- 1970: Turner v. Fouche, overruled a requirement in Taliaferro County, Georgia that grand jury and school board membership be limited to owners of real property.
- 1971: Kennedy-Park Homes Association v. City of Lackawanna, forbade a city government from interfering in the construction of low-income housing in a predominantly white section of the city.
- 1971: Swann v. Charlotte-Mecklenburg Board of Education, upheld intra-district busing to desegregate public schools. However, this issue was contested in the courts for three more decades. In the most recent as of 2004 related cases, the U.S. Supreme Court in April 2002 refused to review Cappachione v. Charlotte-Mecklenburg Board of Education and Belk v. Charlotte-Mecklenburg Board of Education, in which lower courts had ruled in favor of the school district.
- 1971: Haines v. Kerner, upheld the right of prisoners to challenge prison conditions in federal court.
- 1971: Groppi v. Wisconsin, upheld the right of a criminal defendant in a misdemeanor case to a venue where jurors are not biased against him.
- 1971: Clay v. United States, struck down Muhammad Ali's conviction for refusing to report for military service.
- 1971: Griggs v. Duke Power Company, ruled that tests for employment or promotion that produce different outcomes for blacks and whites are prima facie to be presumed discriminatory, and must measure aptitude for the job in question or they cannot be used.
- 1971: Phillips v. Martin Marietta, ruled that employers may not refuse to hire women with pre-school-aged children unless the same standards are applied to men.
- 1972: Furman v. Georgia, ruled that the death penalty as then applied in 37 states violated the Eighth Amendment prohibition of cruel and unusual punishment because there were inadequate standards to guide judges and juries making the decision which defendants will receive a sentence of death. However, under revised laws, U.S. executions resumed in 1977.
- 1972: Wright v. Council of the City of Emporia and U.S. v. Scotland Neck City Board of Education, ruled against systems' avoiding public school desegregation by the creation of all-white "splinter districts".
- 1972: Alexander v. Louisiana, accepted the use of statistical evidence to prove racial discrimination in the selection of juries.
- 1972: Hawkins v. Town of Shaw, banned discrimination in the provision of municipal facilities.
- 1973: Norwood v. Harrison banned government provision of school books to segregated private schools established to allow whites to avoid public school desegregation.
- 1973: Keyes v. School District No. 1, Denver, addressed deliberate de facto school segregation, ruling that where deliberate segregation was shown to have affected a substantial part of a school system, the entire district must ordinarily be desegregated.
- 1973: Adams v. Richardson, required federal education officials to enforce Title VI of the 1964 Civil Rights Act, which requires that state universities, public schools, and other institutions that receive federal money may not discriminate by race.
- 1973: Ham v. South Carolina, ruled that defendants are entitled to have potential jurors interrogated about whether they harbor racial prejudices.
- 1973: McDonnell Douglas Corp. v. Green, ruled that courts should hear cases of alleged unlawful discrimination based on the "minimal showing" that a qualified non-white applied unsuccessfully for a job that either remained open or was filled by a white person.
- 1973: Mourning v. Family Publication Service, upheld the Truth in lending Act, requiring disclosure of the actual cost of a loan.
- 1975: Albemarle v. Moody, mandated back pay for victims of job discrimination.
- 1975: Johnson v. Railway Express Agency, upheld the Civil Rights Act of 1866, passed during Reconstruction, as providing an independent remedy for employment discrimination.
- 1977: Coker v. Georgia, banned capital punishment for rape, the most racially disproportionate application of the death penalty.
- 1977: United Jewish Organizations of Williamsburgh v. Carey, provided that states may consider race in drawing electoral districts if necessary to comply with the Voting Rights Act of 1965 by avoiding a dilution of minority voting strength.

=== 1980s ===
- 1980: Luévano v. Campbell, struck down Federal government use of a written test for hiring into nearly 200 entry-level positions because the test disproportionately disqualified African Americans and Latinos.
- 1980: Enmund v. Florida, struck down a federal "felony murder" statute.
- 1982: Bob Jones University v. U.S. and Goldboro Christian Schools v. U.S., denied tax exempt status to religious schools that discriminate on the basis of race.
- 1983: Major v. Treen, overturned a Louisiana gerrymander intended to reduce African-American voting strength.
- 1984: Gingles v. Edmisten, continued as Thornburg v. Gingles (1986), the Supreme Court ruled that at-large countywide election of state legislators illegally discriminated against black voters, and the Court established the standard for identifying "vote dilution" under the 1982 amendments to the Voting Rights Act.
- 1986: Dillard v. Crenshaw County Commission: a district court ordered over 180 of the local government bodies in counties, cities, and school boards in Alabama to change their methods of election because intentionally racially discriminatory state laws had made it extremely difficult for Black voters to elect their preferred candidates to local office.
- 1987: McClesky v. Kemp: in a 5–4 vote, the U.S. Supreme Court rejected a challenge to Georgia's death penalty and held that statistical evidence showing pervasive racial bias in the administration of the death penalty was not sufficient to invalidate a death sentence.
- 1988: Jiggets v. Housing Authority of City of Elizabeth: a district court ordered the HUD to spend $4 million to upgrade predominantly black, as well as predominantly white, housing projects in the city, and to implement federal maintenance, tenant selection and other procedures equitably.
- 1989: Cook v. Ochsner: in a belated coda to Simkins v. Moses H. Cone Memorial Hospital, a district court approved a settlement ending a New Orleans hospital's discrimination in emergency room treatment and patient admissions. The settlement also provided increased opportunities for African-American physicians to practice at the hospital.

=== 1990s ===
- 1990: Missouri v. Jenkins, established that a federal court could order local tax increases to fund magnet schools as a part of a school desegregation order.
- 1991: Chisom v. Roemer and Houston Lawyers Association v. Attorney General, established that Voting Rights Act applies to the election of judges.
- 1991: Board of Education of Oklahoma City v. Dowell, established the standard for resolving longstanding school desegregation orders.
- 1992: Matthews v. Coye and Thompson v. Raiford, compelled California and Texas, respectively, to enforce and implement federal regulations calling for testing of poor children for lead poisoning.
- 1993: Haynes v. Shoney's: A record court-approved settlement in an employment discrimination case. Shoney's Restaurants agreed to pay African-American employees, applicants, and white managers who resisted the practices, $105 million and to implement aggressive equal employment opportunity measures.
- 1994: Lawson v. City of Los Angeles and Silva v. City of Los Angeles, led to settlements to end discriminatory use of police dogs in minority neighborhoods.
- 1995: McKennon v. Nashville Banner: The Supreme Court refused to allow employers to defeat otherwise valid claims of job discrimination by relying on facts they did not know until after the discriminatory decision had been made.
- 1996: Sheff v. O'Neill: The Supreme Court of Connecticut, in view of the disparities between Hartford public schools and schools in the surrounding suburbs, found the state liable for maintaining racial and ethnic isolation, and ordered the legislative and executive branches to propose a remedy.
- 1997: Robinson v. Shell Oil Company, determined that a former employee may sue his ex-employer for retaliating against him (by giving a bad job reference) after he filed discrimination charges over his termination.
- 1998: Wright v. Universal Maritime Service Corp., determined that a general arbitration clause in a collective bargaining agreement did not deprive an employee of his right to enforce federal anti-discrimination laws in federal court.
- 1999: Campaign to Save Our Public Hospitals v. Giuliani, barred New York City mayor Rudolph Giuliani's attempt to privatize public hospitals.

=== 2000s ===
- 2000: Rideau v. Whitley, the U.S. Court of Appeals for the Fifth Circuit threw out the 28-year-old, third conviction of Wilbert Rideau for murder because of discrimination in the composition of the Grand Jury that originally indicted him more than 40 years earlier. (Rideau was retried, convicted on the lesser charge of manslaughter, and released in 2005.)
- 2000: Smith v. United States, was resolved when President Clinton commuted the sentence of Kemba Smith. Smith was a young African-American mother whose abusive, domineering boyfriend led her to play a peripheral role (she did not sell drugs but was aware of the selling) in a conspiracy to obtain and distribute crack cocaine. She had been sentenced to a mandatory minimum of 24 1/2 years in prison even though she was a first-time offender.
- 2000: Cromartie v. Hunt and Daly v. Hunt, ruled that it is legal to create, for partisan political reasons, a district with a high concentration of minority voters; hence the North Carolina district from which Mel Watt was elected to the House of Representatives was ruled not to be an illegal gerrymander.
- 2003: Gratz v. Bollinger, ordered the University of Michigan to change admission policies by removing racial quotas in the form of "points", but allowed them to continue to utilize race as a factor in admissions, to admit a diverse entering class of students.
- 2007: Parents Involved in Community Schools v. Seattle School District No. 1, the Supreme Court ruled racial quotas unconstitutional in PK–12 school assignment, but allowed other remedial school integration programs to continue
- 2009: Northwest Austin Municipal Utility District No. 1 v. Holder, the Supreme Court ruled the Voting Rights Act Section 5 preclearance process constitutional. LDF presented oral argument at the Supreme Court on behalf of a group of African-American voters.

=== 2010s ===
- 2010: Lewis v. City of Chicago, the Supreme Court ruled unanimously that the City of Chicago can be held accountable for each and every time it used a hiring practice that arbitrarily blocked qualified minority applicants from employment. LDF presented oral argument in this case in the Supreme Court.
- 2013: Shelby County v. Holder, the Supreme Court struck down Section 4(b) of the Voting Rights Act, ending the Section 5 preclearance regime. LDF presented oral argument and represented a group of African-American voters in the Supreme Court.
- 2013: Fisher v. University of Texas, the Supreme Court upheld the constitutionality of affirmative action, and remanded the case to the U.S. Court of Appeals for the Fifth Circuit for a second view. LDF represented the Black Student Alliance and the Black Ex-Students of Texas, Inc.
- 2014: Schuette v. Coalition to Defend Affirmative Action, the Supreme Court upheld the constitutionality of the Michigan's Proposal 2 voter initiative, which amended the state's constitution to make affirmative action illegal in public employment, public education or public contracting purposes. LDF represented the Plaintiffs challenging Proposal 2.
- 2016: Fisher v. University of Texas II, Following the remand to the U.S. Court of Appeals for the Fifth Circuit, the Supreme Court again upheld the constitutionality of affirmative action. LDF represented the Black Student Alliance and the Black Ex-Students of Texas, Inc. in oral argument before the U.S. Court of Appeals and in an amicus brief in the Supreme Court.
- 2016: Veasey v. Abbott, The U.S. Court of Appeals for the Fifth Circuit, sitting en banc, held that Texas's 2011 voter photo identification law violated the Voting Rights Act and that there was sufficient evidence to find that the Texas Legislature might have passed the law for the purpose of discriminating against Black and Latino voters. LDF presented oral argument in the Fifth Circuit on behalf of Black students and the Texas League of Young Voters.
- 2017: Buck v. Davis, the Supreme Court reversed the death sentence of Mr. Duane Buck because Mr. Buck's trial attorney introduced evidence that suggested Mr. Buck was more likely to commit violent acts in the future because he is black. LDF represented and presented oral argument on Mr. Buck's behalf in the Supreme Court.
- 2018: Stout v. Jefferson County Board of Education and Gardendale Board of Education, The U.S. Court of Appeals for the Eleventh Circuit, blocked the City of Gardendale's attempt to secede from the larger Jefferson County school system because Gardendale's purpose was to create a mostly white school system separate from the more racially diverse Jefferson County schools. LDF represents and presented oral arguments on behalf of Black students opposed to the separation.

=== 2020s ===
- 2020: LDF v. Barr, the U.S. District Court for the District of Columbia granted summary judgment to LDF and ruled that the Presidential Commission on Law Enforcement and the Administration of Justice violated multiple requirements of the Federal Advisory Committee Act, halting the Commission's operations until it was brought into compliance with federal law.
- 2020: Harding v. Edwards, in September 2020, the U.S. District Court for the Middle District of Louisiana granted a preliminary injunction that required Louisiana to extend the early voting period by three days and provided voters at highest risk of serious illness from COVID-19 with the option to vote by mail in the November and December 2020 primary and general elections.
- 2020: Thomas v. Andino, in May 2020, the U.S. District Court for the District of South Carolina granted a preliminary junction that prohibited South Carolina from enforcing its witness signature requirement for absentee voters in the June 2020 primary elections. The court found that forcing people to obtain the signature of a third-party witness on their absentee ballot would endanger their health and safety in light of the COVID-19 pandemic.
- 2020: NAACP v. United States Postal Service, the U.S. District Court for the District of Columbia ruled that the US Postal Service's widespread disruptions in mail delivery violated federal law and risked delaying the delivery of mail-in ballots — thereby causing voter disenfranchisement. On October 10, 2020, the court granted a preliminary injunction motion suspending service changes that had disrupted mail delivery. The court issued a series of additional orders leading up to the November 2020 General Election, which required the US Postal Service to take extraordinary measures to ensure the timely delivery of ballots and to provide daily updates about the delivery status of mail-in ballots. LDF represented the NAACP and individuals in the litigation.
- 2023: Allen v. Milligan, on June 8, 2023, the U.S. Supreme Court affirmed a preliminary injunction against the State of Alabama's 2021 congressional districts and ruled that Alabama's map is racially discriminatory in violation of Section 2 of the Voting Rights Act. The Supreme Court also upheld the constitutionality of the Voting Rights Act in the redistricting context. LDF represented Milligan plaintiffs in the lower courts and presented oral argument on behalf of the Milligan appellees in the Supreme Court.
- 2024: Robinson v. Ardoin, In June 2022, a federal court preliminary enjoined Louisiana's congressional map and ordered the state to draw a map with two majority-Black districts. But the Supreme Court of the United States put this order on hold temporarily pending its decision in Milligan. After the Milligan ruling, the Supreme Court returned the case to the lower courts, which ultimately gave the Louisiana legislature the chance to draw a map with a second majority-Black district. And, in January 2024, the Legislature responded by adopting a new VRA-compliant map. LDF represented the Robinson plaintiffs in the Supreme Court and lower courts.
- 2024: Alexander v. South Carolina State Conference of the NAACP, on January 6, 2023, a three-judge district court ruled against the State of South Carolina's 2021 congressional map and concluded that the map is an unconstitutional racial gerrymander and intentionally discriminatory in violation of the Fourteenth and Fifteenth Amendments. The Supreme Court took the case up on direct appeal and heard oral arguments on October 11, 2023. LDF represented the plaintiffs at trial and presented oral argument on their behalf in the Supreme Court.

== Presidents and director-counsels ==
The position was installed under the title of "Director-Counsel" on March 20, 1940, until 1993, when Elaine Jones got appointed and the official title was expanded and hyphenated.

#	Presidents & Director-Counsel	Life span	Term start	Term end	Tenure length
1	Thurgood Marshall	1908–1993	March 20, 1940	October 3, 1961	21 years, 197 days
2	Jack Greenberg	1924–2016	October 4, 1961	July 31, 1984	22 years, 301 days
3	Julius L. Chambers	1936–2013	August 1, 1984	December 31, 1993	9 years, 152 days
4	Elaine R. Jones	1944-	January 1, 1993	April 30, 2004	11 years, 120 days
5	Ted M. Shaw	1954–	May 1, 2004	February 29, 2008	3 years, 304 days
6	John A. Payton	1946–2012	March 1, 2008	March 22, 2012	4 years, 21 days
7	Sherrilyn Ifill	1962-	January 22, 2013	March 14, 2022	9 years, 51 days
8	Janai S. Nelson	1971-	March 15, 2022	Incumbent	4 years, 238 days

== Prominent LDF alumni ==
A number of prominent attorneys have been affiliated with LDF over the years, including Barack Obama who was an LDF cooperating attorney. The following, non-exhaustive list of LDF alumni demonstrates the breadth of positions these attorneys have held or currently hold in public service, the government, academia, the private sector, and other areas.

- Debo Adegbile, former acting President-Director Counsel for LDF (2012–2013), argued twice in the U.S. Supreme Court in defense of the constitutionality of the Voting Rights Act, and a current Commissioner for the United States Civil Rights Commission.
- Derrick A. Bell Jr., the first tenured African-American Harvard Law School professor, professor at New York University School of Law, and preeminent Critical Race Theorist.
- Victor Allen Bolden, a federal judge in the U.S. District Court for the District of Connecticut.
- Jacqueline A. Berrien, chair of the U.S. Equal Employment Opportunity Commission, appointed by President Obama and confirmed by the Senate on December 22, 2010. Immediately prior to her appointment, Ms. Berrien was the Director of Litigation and Associate Director-Counsel for LDF.
- Jocelyn Benson is the Secretary of State of Michigan. She is also the former Dean of Wayne State University Law School. She was a summer legal intern at LDF.
- Robert L. Carter, an assistant counsel at LDF until its 1956 separation from the NAACP, and an architect of Brown v. Board. After the separation, he replaced Thurgood Marshall as the General Counsel for the NAACP. He won numerous cases at the Supreme Court and was a federal judge on the United States District Court for the Southern District of New York
- Julius L. Chambers, third director-counsel of LDF. He argued Swann v. Charlotte-Mecklenburg Board of Education, which upheld the constitutionality of busing to achieve school desegregation.
- Kristen Clarke, the former Assistant Attorney General for the Civil Rights Division since 2021 and former President of the Lawyers' Committee for Civil Rights Under Law. She previously headed the Civil Rights bureau of the New York Attorney General Eric Schneiderman.
- U. W. Clemon, first African-American federal judge in Alabama, retired from the U.S. District Court for the Northern District of Alabama, and one of the first Black officials elected to the Alabama Senate in modern times.
- William Thaddeus Coleman Jr., President emeritus of LDF's board and Secretary of Transportation in the administration of President Gerald Ford.
- Drew S. Days, III, the first African-American Assistant Attorney General for the United States Department of Justice's Civil Rights Division and the United States Solicitor General from 1993 to 1996.
- Marian Wright Edelman, founder of the Children's Defense Fund. During the Mississippi Freedom Summer she headed LDF's Jackson, Mississippi office and handled more than 120 cases.
- Jean E. Fairfax, organizer, educator; creator of the division of legal information and community service and director of that division from 1965 to 1984
- Jack Greenberg succeeded Thurgood Marshall and served as LDF's second director-counsel from 1961 to 1984. Greenberg began as an Assistant Counsel at LDF in 1949. He argued more than 40 of LDF's cases before the Supreme Court, including a portion of Brown v. Board. While he was director-counsel, LDF successfully defended the civil rights movement, ended "all deliberate speed" in desegregation the first employment discrimination lawsuits in the Supreme Court, and brought about a national moratorium on the death penalty. After leaving the LDF, Greenberg was a professor at Columbia Law School and the former Dean of Columbia College.
- Lani Guinier, voting rights advocate and the first African-American woman tenured professor at Harvard Law.
- Vanita Gupta, the Associate Attorney General of the United States since April 2021. She was formerly the President and Chief Executive Officer of the Leadership Conference on Civil and Human Rights, and the Principal Deputy Assistant Attorney General and acting head of the Civil Rights Division at the U.S. Department of Justice from October 2014 until January 2017.
- Dale Ho, a federal judge on the United States District Court for the Southern District of New York.
- Eric Holder, the first African-American United States Attorney General. Holder was a member of LDF's Board of Directors and interned for LDF as a law student.
- Elaine Jones, successfully argued Furman v. Georgia. LDF's fourth director-counsel and the first female director-counsel.
- Pamela S. Karlan, Principal Deputy Assistant Attorney General for the Civil Rights Division at the U.S. Department of Justice since January 2021 and the Kenneth and Harle Montgomery Professor of Public Interest Law at Stanford Law School. She is frequently mentioned as a potential democratic appointee to the U.S. Supreme Court.
- David E. Kendall, a partner at Williams & Connolly LLP, he represented President Bill Clinton during the President's impeachment proceedings. He is a former LDF staff attorney and currently a member of its board of directors.
- Bill Lann Lee, the first Chinese-American Assistant Attorney General for the Civil Rights Division.
- Thurgood Marshall, LDF founder and the first African-American Supreme Court Justice. Marshall left LDF in 1961 to become a judge of the United States Court of Appeals for the Second Circuit before going on to become Solicitor General of the United States and Associate Justice of the United States Supreme Court.
- Gabrielle Kirk McDonald, a former federal judge of the United States District Court for the Southern District of Texas and a former judge of the International Criminal Tribunal for the former Yugoslavia. McDonald was one of the first eleven judges elected by the United Nations to serve on the Yugoslav Tribunal and became its president between 1997 and 1999.
- Natasha C. Merle, a federal judge for the United States District Court for the Eastern District of New York.
- Constance Baker Motley, the first African-American woman to be appointed a Federal Court Judge and the first to argue before the Supreme Court.
- James Nabrit III was an LDF attorney from 1959 to 1989.
- Kellis Parker, who became director of the LDF in 1977, was the first African-American professor at Columbia Law School.
- Dennis Parker, the executive director of the National Center for Law and Economic Justice. He formerly was the Chief of the Civil Rights Bureau in the office of the New York Attorney General and, prior to that, worked for over a dozen years at LDF.
- Deval Patrick, the first African-American Governor of Massachusetts and only the second African American to be elected governor of any state.
- Cornelia Pillard, a federal judge on the U.S. Court of Appeals for the D.C. Circuit.
- Reince Priebus, served as White House Chief of Staff for President Donald Trump in 2017. He also served as the chairman of the Republican National Committee from 2011 to 2017. He interned for LDF as a law student.
- Constance L. Rice, civil rights activist and founder of the Advancement Project.
- Spottswood William Robinson III, the first African-American appointed to the United States Court of Appeals for the District of Columbia Circuit.
- Theodore Shaw, Julius L. Chambers Distinguished Professor of Law and Director of the Center for Civil Rights at the University of North Carolina at Chapel Hill, Professor Shaw served as the fifth president and director-counsel.
- Christina Swarns, the Executive Director of the Innocence Project. She previously served as the director of litigation for LDF and, in that role argued and won Buck v. Davis in the U.S. Supreme Court. She is one of the few African-American women to have ever argued a case in the Supreme Court.
- Holly A. Thomas, a federal judge on the United States Court of Appeals for the Ninth Circuit.
- Maya Wiley, an MSNBC Legal Analyst, civil rights activist, lawyer, and 2021 mayoral candidate for New York City and the Henry Cohen Professor of Urban Policy and Management at The New School. Wiley is also the former board chair of the New York City Civilian Complaint Review Board, and former counsel to the Mayor of New York City, Bill de Blasio.
- Theodore V. Wells, Jr., trial lawyer and former chairman of the board
