= William Gibson (NAACP activist) =

American dentist

Chair of the National Association for the Advancement of Colored People
- In office 1985–1995
- Preceded by: Kelly Alexander Sr.
- Succeeded by: Myrlie Evers-Williams

Personal details
- Born: November 23, 1933 Greenville, South Carolina, U.S.
- Died: May 2, 2002 (aged 68) Greenville, South Carolina, U.S.
- Education: North Carolina A&T State University (BA); Meharry Medical College (DMD)

William F. Gibson (November 23, 1933 – May 2, 2002) was an African-American dentist who served as chair of the National Association for the Advancement of Colored People (NAACP) from 1985 to 1995.

Gibson was a graduate of North Carolina A&T State University and Meharry Medical College. He served as president of the NAACP's regional branch in Greenville, South Carolina before succeeding Margaret Bush Wilson as national chairperson. As chair, he encouraged voter registration and worked to increase economic opportunities for African Americans. In 1995 NAACP board members voted 30–29 to replace Gibson with Myrlie Evers-Williams, widow of Medgar Evers.

Gibson died of cancer at the age of 69 in Greenville on May 2, 2002.
