= Kelly Alexander Sr. =

Civil rights activist (1915–1985)

Kelly Alexander
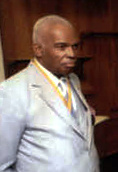

Chair of the National Association for the Advancement of Colored People
- In office 1983–1984
- Preceded by: Margaret Bush Wilson
- Succeeded by: William Gibson

Personal details
- Born: Kelly Miller Alexander; August 18, 1915 Charlotte, North Carolina, U.S.
- Died: April 2, 1985 (aged 69) St. Louis, Missouri, U.S.
- Spouse: Margaret Gilreece
- Relatives: Frederick D. Alexander (brother)
- Education: Tuskegee University (BA); Renouard College

Kelly Miller Alexander Sr. (August 18, 1915 – April 2, 1985) was chairman of the board of directors of the National Association for the Advancement of Colored People and a civil rights activist. He was born in Charlotte, North Carolina, to Zechariah and Louise Alexander. His father was the owner of the Alexander Funeral Home, the only black funeral home in Charlotte. He played football at Second Ward High School, becoming known as "Ship-wreck Kelly." Alexander studied at the Tuskegee Institute in Alabama and Renouard College of Embalming in New York City before returning to Charlotte to help run his father's business.

His activism in the NAACP began in 1938 when he joined the Charlotte branch of the NAACP. In 1940 he took over leadership of the Charlotte branch, turning it into a powerful civil rights force within the city. In 1948 Alexander was elected president of the North Carolina State Conference of the NAACP and began founding other chapters in the state of North Carolina. He would hold the post of President until 1984. Under his leadership, the NC Conference became the largest state conference in the country with over 120 branches.

Alexander ran for the Charlotte City Council twice in the 1950s but was unsuccessful. As an activist in Charlotte he fought for the desegregation of restaurants and hotels in the area. He also supported the landmark Supreme Court of the United States Case Swann v. Charlotte-Mecklenburg Board of Education that said busing could be used to integrate schools.

In 1965 Alexander's home was one of four homes bombed by someone trying to stifle the civil rights movement in Charlotte. Alexander's brother Frederick Alexander's home was hit along with civil rights lawyer Julius Chambers and activist Reginald Hawkins. No one was injured from the explosion.

In 1950, Alexander was elected to serve on the National NAACP Board of Directors. In 1976 he was elected vice chair. In 1983 the NAACP board asked Alexander to become the acting chairman after a disruptive dispute between chairman Margaret Wilson and executive director Benjamin Hooks. Alexander accepted the chair and reorganized the NAACP. His work and leadership with the NAACP led him to be known as Mr. NAACP by his friends and colleagues.

Alexander died on April 2, 1985, at the age of 69. He passed on his legacy of fighting for equality to his two sons, Kelly Alexander Jr who would become president of the NC Conference of the NAACP and Alfred Alexander who took over the family business.
