= Elaine Jones =

American attorney and activist

President of the NAACP Legal Defense and Educational Fund
- In office 1993–2004
- Preceded by: Julius L. Chambers
- Succeeded by: Ted Shaw

Personal details
- Born: March 2, 1944 (age 81) Norfolk, Virginia, U.S.
- Education: Howard University (BA); University of Virginia (JD)

Elaine R. Jones (born March 2, 1944) is an American civil rights attorney and activist. She joined the NAACP Legal Defense Fund (LDF) in 1970 and in 1993 became the organization's first female director-counsel and president.

== Early life and education ==
Born on March 2, 1944, in Norfolk, Virginia, Elaine Jones came of age in the Jim Crow South and learned its painful lessons early on. Her mother was a college-educated schoolteacher and her father was a Pullman porter and a member of the nation's first black trade union. Her parents taught her about the realities of racism, but also about the importance of idealism.

After graduating with honors in political science from Howard University in 1965, Jones taught English from 1965 to 1967 in Peace Corps and became one of the first African Americans to serve in Turkey. Following her two-year Peace Corps stint, she became the first African-American woman to enroll in the University of Virginia School of Law graduating in 1970 and, subsequently, the first to graduate.

== Civil rights career ==
After graduating from law school in 1970, Jones joined the NAACP Legal Defense Fund (LDF), the nation’s oldest law firm fighting for equal rights and justice for people of color, women and the poor. She was one of the first African-American women to defend death row inmates. Her trials were regularly picketed by the Ku Klux Klan. In 1972, only two years out of law school, she was counsel of record in Furman v. Georgia, a landmark U.S. Supreme Court case that abolished the death penalty in 37 states. During this period, she also argued numerous employment discrimination cases, including class actions against some of the nation's largest employers (such as Patterson v. American Tobacco Co., Stallworth v. Monsanto, and Swint v. Pullman Standard).

In 1975, Jones was named special assistant to the U.S. Secretary of Transportation, William T. Coleman, Jr. During her tenure she helped write policy that opened the United States Coast Guard to women. She returned to the LDF in 1977, where she originated the position of legislative advocate in the LDF's Washington, D.C. office. In that capacity, she earned a reputation as a skillful negotiator and an ardent voice for those who have been shut out of the economic, political, and social mainstream. Her work was instrumental in reshaping the federal judiciary to include more people of color and more judges committed to equal rights. She also played a key role in securing passage of legislative milestones such as the Voting Rights Act Amendments of 1982, the Fair Housing Act of 1988, the Civil Rights Restoration Act of 1988, and the Civil Rights Act of 1991.

== President of the LDF ==
In 1993, Jones became the first woman to be appointed president and director-counsel of the LDF. As President and Director-Counsel, Elaine Jones expanded LDF's litigation into new areas such as health care and environmental justice, while keeping the organization focused on its core work in education, voting rights, economic access and criminal justice.

Under her leadership, the LDF successfully defended affirmative action in Gratz v. Bollinger and directed a successful clemency campaign on behalf of an incarcerated young woman, Kemba Smith, to underscore over-incarceration and draconian federal mandatory minimum sentencing guidelines.

In 2000 President Bill Clinton presented Jones with the Eleanor Roosevelt Human Rights Award in recognition of her activism.

In 2004, after 34 years of service, she stepped down from her position and left the LDF.

== Controversy ==
In 2002, Jones contacted the office of U.S. Senator Edward Kennedy asking him to delay any Senate Judiciary Committee hearings on nominees to the U.S. Court of Appeals for the 6th Circuit. At that time, the en banc 6th Circuit was actively considering a constitutional and legal challenge brought against the affirmative action admissions program used by the University of Michigan. According to a memorandum written by the Senate staffer who spoke with her, the purpose and intent of Jones’ request was "to ask that the Judiciary Committee consider scheduling Julia [Smith] Gibbons, the uncontroversial nominee to the 6th Circuit[,] at a later date, rather than at a hearing next Thursday, April 25th." Conservative critics saw the incident as unethical behavior and unsuccessfully sought to have Jones sanctioned.

== Awards ==
- Foremother Award from National Center for Health Research, 2016

== Personal life ==
Jones is a member of The Links.
