= Kelly Alexander =

American politician from North Carolina (1948–2024)

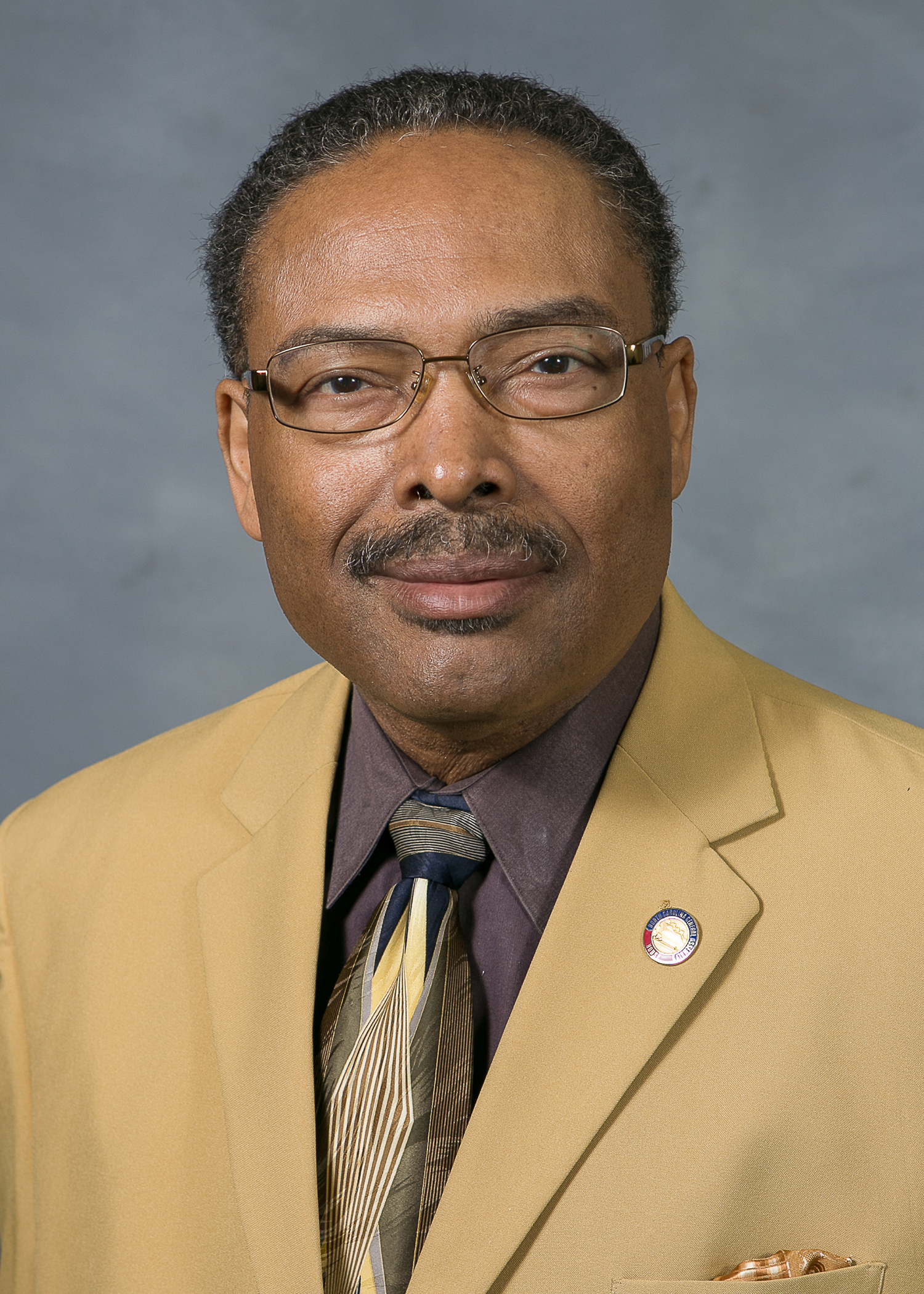

Member of the North Carolina House of Representatives from the 107th district
- In office January 1, 2009 – September 6, 2024
- Preceded by: Pete Cunningham
- Succeeded by: Bobby Drakeford

Personal details
- Born: Kelly Miller Alexander Jr. October 17, 1948 Charlotte, North Carolina, U.S.
- Died: September 6, 2024 (aged 75)
- Party: Democratic
- Relatives: Kelly Alexander Sr. (father); Frederick Alexander (uncle)
- Education: University of North Carolina at Chapel Hill (BS, MPA)

Kelly Miller Alexander Jr. (October 17, 1948 – September 6, 2024) was an American politician who was a Democratic member of the North Carolina House of Representatives, representing the 107th district from 2009 until his death in 2024. During the 2015 legislative session, Alexander was one of 22 African Americans in the North Carolina House of Representatives.

== Early life ==
Alexander was the son of NAACP chair Kelly Alexander Sr. and nephew of civil rights activist Frederick Alexander.

He attended West Charlotte High School and University of North Carolina at Chapel Hill. While at UNC, in 1969, he was one of the students who started Project Uplift, designed to provide high school seniors exposure to college life by allowing the high school students to stay in the university students' rooms and showing them the university.

Alexander returned to Charlotte after college to manage the Alexander Funeral Home. He has taught classes at Central Piedmont Community College, Johnson C. Smith University, Queens University of Charlotte and University of North Carolina at Charlotte.

== Political career ==
Following in his father's footsteps, Alexander became President of the NC NAACP and served on the national NAACP board. He first ran for NC General Assembly in 2008 and won, taking his oath in 2009.

Alexander was the first African American to be appointed to the Airport Advisory Committee from 1978 to 1984. He was involved in preventing an NC amendment that would allow state assemblymen to serve for four terms instead of two.

== Death ==
Alexander died on September 6, 2024, at the age of 75. Alexander is buried at Gethsemane Memorial Gardens Charlotte, NC.

== Electoral history ==
=== 2022 ===
North Carolina House of Representatives 107th district Democratic primary election, 2022
Party	Candidate	Votes	%
Democratic	Kelly Alexander (incumbent)	5,602	83.50%
Democratic	Vermanno Bowman	1,107	16.50%
Total votes		6,709	100%

North Carolina House of Representatives 107th district general election, 2022
Party	Candidate	Votes	%
Democratic	Kelly Alexander (incumbent)	18,896	81.86%
Republican	Mark Alan Cook	4,187	18.14%
Total votes		23,083	100%
Democratic hold			

=== 2020 ===
North Carolina House of Representatives 107th district general election, 2020
Party	Candidate	Votes	%
Democratic	Kelly Alexander (incumbent)	37,421	81.33%
Republican	Richard Rivette	8,591	18.67%
Total votes		46,012	100%
Democratic hold			

=== 2018 ===
North Carolina House of Representatives 107th district general election, 2018
Party	Candidate	Votes	%
Democratic	Kelly Alexander (incumbent)	24,453	100%
Total votes		24,453	100%
Democratic hold			

=== 2016 ===
North Carolina House of Representatives 107th district Democratic primary election, 2016
Party	Candidate	Votes	%
Democratic	Kelly Alexander (incumbent)	10,304	90.14%
Democratic	Robert Blok	1,127	9.86%
Total votes		11,431	100%

North Carolina House of Representatives 107th district general election, 2016
Party	Candidate	Votes	%
Democratic	Kelly Alexander (incumbent)	34,305	100%
Total votes		34,305	100%
Democratic hold			

=== 2014 ===
North Carolina House of Representatives 107th district general election, 2014
Party	Candidate	Votes	%
Democratic	Kelly Alexander (incumbent)	18,049	100%
Total votes		18,049	100%
Democratic hold			

=== 2012 ===
North Carolina House of Representatives 107th district general election, 2012
Party	Candidate	Votes	%
Democratic	Kelly Alexander (incumbent)	32,275	100%
Total votes		32,275	100%
Democratic hold			

=== 2010 ===
North Carolina House of Representatives 107th district general election, 2010
Party	Candidate	Votes	%
Democratic	Kelly Alexander (incumbent)	13,132	67.26%
Republican	Debbie Ware	6,392	32.74%
Total votes		19,524	100%
Democratic hold			

=== 2008 ===
North Carolina House of Representatives 107th district Democratic primary election, 2008
Party	Candidate	Votes	%
Democratic	Kelly Alexander	8,542	63.53%
Democratic	Mary Nixon Richardson	4,903	36.47%
Total votes		13,445	100%

North Carolina House of Representatives 107th district general election, 2008
Party	Candidate	Votes	%
Democratic	Kelly Alexander	27,502	75.26%
Republican	Gary Hardee	9,043	24.74%
Total votes		36,545	100%
Democratic hold			

North Carolina House of Representatives
Preceded by Pete Cunningham	Member of the North Carolina House of Representatives from the 107th district 2009–2024	Succeeded by Bobby Drakeford
