= Brandeis Medal =

Justice award in US

The Brandeis Medal is awarded to individuals whose lives reflect United States Supreme Court Justice Louis Brandeis' commitment to the ideals of individual liberty, concern for the disadvantaged and public service.

The medal is awarded by the University of Louisville's Louis D. Brandeis Society, and is given in tribute to Brandeis, a former U.S. Supreme Court justice from Louisville and the namesake university's law school.

== Past recipients ==
- 1983: Harry Blackmun, Supreme Court Justice
- 1985: Charles M. Allen, Kentucky judge
- 1987: John Palmore, Kentucky Supreme Court Chief Justice
- 1991: Morris Dees, civil rights lawyer
- 1992: Sandra Day O'Connor, Supreme Court Justice
- 1995: Robert Morgenthau, District Attorney of New York County
- 1998: Stephen Bright, lawyer
- 1999: Abner Mikva, Congressman, judge, and legal scholar
- 2000: John Lewis, Congressman
- 2001: Samuel Dash, lawyer and professor
- 2002: Janet Reno, United States Attorney General
- 2003: Ruth Bader Ginsburg, Supreme Court Justice
- 2004: Stephen Breyer, Supreme Court Justice
- 2005: Howard Baker, Senator
- 2008: Linda Greenhouse, Supreme Court journalist
- 2010: Melvin I. Urofsky, Brandeis biographer
- 2013: John Paul Stevens, Supreme Court Justice
- 2014: Eugene Robinson, journalist
- 2015: Arthur R. Miller, legal scholar
- 2016: Elena Kagan, Supreme Court Justice
- 2019: Bob Woodward, journalist
- 2023: Sherrilyn Ifill, lawyer
- 2025: Sonia Sotomayor, Supreme Court Justice

Other recipients include Senator Chris Dodd, Shirley Hufstedler, Archibald Cox, A. Leon Higginbotham Jr., and Charles Ogletree.
