= Julius L. Chambers =

American lawyer, civil rights leader and educator

Julius Chambers
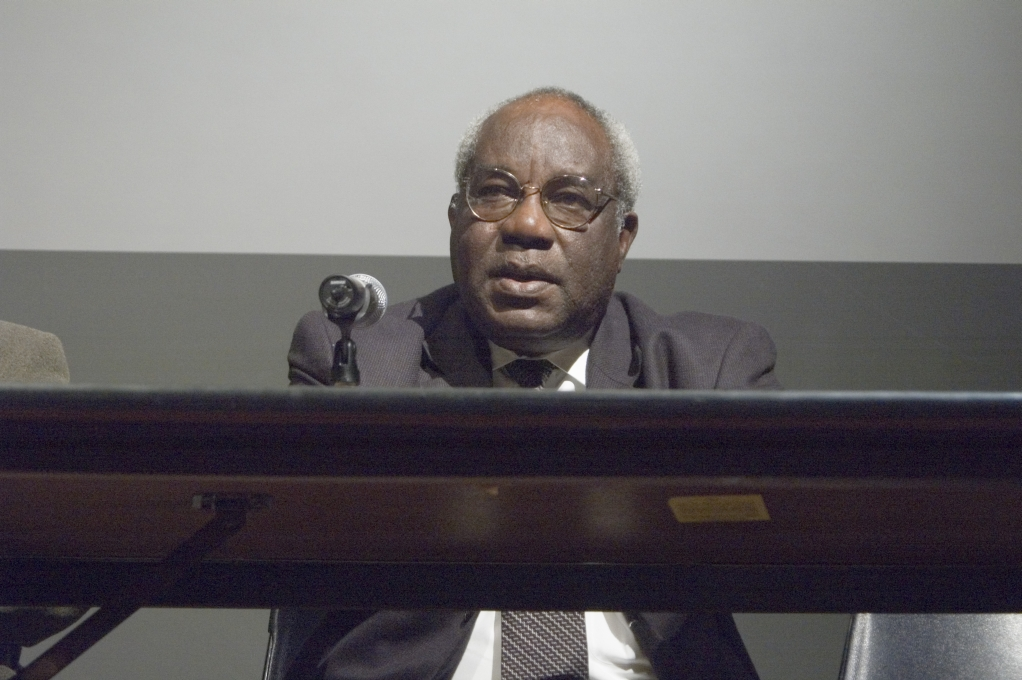
- Chambers in 2007

President of the NAACP Legal Defense and Educational Fund
- In office 1984–1993
- Preceded by: Jack Greenberg
- Succeeded by: Elaine Jones

Personal details
- Born: Julius LeVonne Chambers; October 6, 1936 Mount Gilead, North Carolina, U.S.
- Died: August 2, 2013 (aged 76) Charlotte, North Carolina, U.S.
- Education: North Carolina Central University (BA); University of Michigan (MA); University of North Carolina, Chapel Hill (JD); Columbia University (LLM)

Julius LeVonne Chambers (October 6, 1936 – August 2, 2013) was an American lawyer, civil rights leader and educator.

== Early life and education ==
Chambers grew up during the Jim Crow era in rural Montgomery County, North Carolina. As a child, Chambers saw first hand the effects of discrimination when his father's auto repair business became a target of racial injustice in 1948. A white customer refused to pay his father and his father could not find a lawyer who was willing to file suit on behalf of a black man against a white man. Chambers has said that this experience made him resolved to pursue a career in law, in order to help end segregation and racial discrimination. After graduating from high school in 1954 (the same month as the landmark Brown v. Board of Education ruling), he enrolled at North Carolina Central University. He was the president of the student body at NCCU and graduated summa cum laude with an undergraduate degree in history in 1958. He earned a graduate degree in history from the University of Michigan. In 1959, Chambers entered law school at the University of North Carolina at Chapel Hill. He was the first African American editor-in-chief of the school's law review and graduated first in his class of 100 students in 1962. Chambers also became the first African American to gain membership in the Order of the Golden Fleece, the University's highest honorary society. In 1964, he earned his LL.M. from Columbia University Law School. During this period, from 1963 to 1964, Chambers also served as the first intern for the NAACP Legal Defense Fund (LDF) in New York, having been selected by LDF's Director-Counsel Thurgood Marshall.

== Career ==
=== Law practice in Charlotte ===
In June 1964, Chambers began a solo law practice in Charlotte, North Carolina. This firm eventually became the first integrated firm in North Carolina history. With fellow founding partners James E. Ferguson II and Adam Stein, along with lawyers from LDF, the firm successfully litigated a number of key cases before the Supreme Court of the United States that would help to shape evolving American civil rights laws, including: the school busing decision in Swann v. Charlotte-Mecklenburg Board of Education (1971); and two important Title VII employment discrimination cases Griggs v. Duke Power Co. (1971) and Albemarle Paper Co. v. Moody (1975).

The firm's efforts were met several times with violence from white supremacists. While Chambers was at a speaking engagement in January 1965 in New Bern, North Carolina, his car was destroyed by a bomb. On November 22, 1965, in the midst of the first hearings of the Swann school busing case, Chambers's home was bombed along with three other homes of African American leaders: then North Carolina NAACP President Kelly Alexander Sr, his brother Frederick Alexander (a Charlotte city councilman), and community activist Reginald Hawkins. No one was injured. The bombings received a great deal of national television and newspaper coverage, including an article in The New York Times. In February 1971, Chambers's downtown Charlotte law office was also firebombed.

Chambers reentered private law practice with this firm (now Ferguson Stein Chambers Adkins Gresham & Sumter PA) after he retired from his position as chancellor of North Carolina Central University on June 30, 2001.

=== NAACP Legal Defense Fund ===
In 1984, he left the Charlotte firm to again join the NAACP Legal Defense Fund in New York City, this time as its highest executive (Director-Counsel). Under Chambers' leadership, the LDF litigated cases in the areas of education, voting rights, capital punishment, employment, housing and prisons. During this period, the LDF was perhaps best known for its work in defense of affirmative action programs of the 1970s and 1980s.

=== Career as an educator ===
Chambers also had an active career as an educator. In 1993, he left New York (and his position with the LDF) to return to North Carolina in order to become the chancellor of his alma mater, North Carolina Central University. Under his administration, the University launched a $50 million capital fundraising campaign and established its first endowed chairs. He served as chancellor until June 30, 2001.

Chambers also served as lecturer or adjunct professor at a number of law schools, including: Harvard Law (1965), University of Virginia Law School (1975–1978), University of Pennsylvania Law School (1978–1986), Columbia University Law School (1984–1992), and University of Michigan Law School (1985–1992). He also served as the Charles Hamilton Houston Distinguished Professor of Law at North Carolina Central University.

In his last years, Chambers was of counsel with Ferguson Stein Chambers Gresham & Sumter PA in Charlotte, while also serving as a clinical professor of law and director of the Center for Civil Rights at UNC School of Law.

== Publications ==
Chambers authored or contributed to a number of important articles and books on civil rights law, including: "Beyond Affirmative Action" (1998), "Race and Equality: The Still Unfinished Business of the Warren Court," The Warren Court: A Retrospective (1996), "Afterward: Racial Equity and Full Citizenship, The Unfinished Agenda," African Americans and the Living Constitution (1996), "Black Americans and the Courts: Has the Clock Been Turned Back Permanently?," The State of Black America (1990), and "Adequate Education for All: A Right, An Achievable Goal" (1987).

== Politics ==
Chambers supported former North Carolina Senator John Edwards in the 2008 presidential election.

== Personal life ==
Chambers was married to Vivian Giles Chambers and had two children, Derrick and Judy, and three grandchildren. He was a member of Alpha Phi Alpha fraternity, of which he was initiated as an undergrad into the Gamma Beta chapter. His wife, Vivian, died in 2012. Chambers died on August 2, 2013, at the age of 76, after months of bad health. He was survived by two children, three grandchildren and a brother.

== Legacy ==
A 4 miles (6.4 km) section of Interstate 85 in Charlotte, from Interstate 77 (Exit 38) to U.S. Highway 29 (Exit 42), was dedicated as the Julius Chambers Highway in 2018. The former Zebulon B. Vance High School in Charlotte, whose namesake was a former lawyer, politician, and Confederate officer in the Civil War, was renamed to Julius L. Chambers High School in 2020. A quote by Galloway is inscribed on a wall at North Carolina Freedom Park, which opened in 2023.

== Archival sources ==
- Julius L. Chambers papers, J. Murrey Atkins Library, University of North Carolina at Charlotte
