= North Carolina's 107th House district =

American legislative district

North Carolina's 107th State House of Representatives district
Representative
Aisha Dew; D–Charlotte
- Demographics: 23% White; 55% Black; 14% Hispanic; 4% Asian; 4% Multiracial
- Population (2024): 89,080

North Carolina's 107th House district is one of 120 districts in the North Carolina House of Representatives. It has been represented by Democrat Aisha Dew since 2025.

== Geography ==
Since 2003, the district has included part of Mecklenburg County. The district overlaps with the 38th and 41st Senate districts.

== List of members representing the district ==
Representative	Party	Dates	Notes	Counties
District created January 1, 2003.
Pete Cunningham (Charlotte)	Democratic	January 1, 2003 – January 1, 2009	Redistricted from the 59th district and re-elected in 2002. Re-elected in 2004. Re-elected in 2006. Retired.	2003–Present; Part of Mecklenburg County.
Kelly Alexander (Charlotte)	Democratic	January 1, 2009 – September 6, 2024	Elected in 2008. Re-elected in 2010. Re-elected in 2012. Re-elected in 2014. Re-elected in 2016. Re-elected in 2018. Re-elected in 2020. Re-elected in 2022. Announced retirement, then died.	2003–Present; Part of Mecklenburg County.
Vacant		September 6, 2024 – October 7, 2024		2003–Present; Part of Mecklenburg County.
Bobby Drakeford (Charlotte)	Democratic	October 7, 2024 – January 1, 2025	Appointed to finish Alexander's term. Retired.	2003–Present; Part of Mecklenburg County.
Aisha Dew (Charlotte)	Democratic	January 1, 2025 – Present	Elected in 2024.	2003–Present; Part of Mecklenburg County.

== Election results ==
=== 2024 ===
North Carolina House of Representatives 107th district general election, 2024
Party	Candidate	Votes	%
Democratic	Aisha Dew	38,603	100%
Total votes		38,603	100%
Democratic hold			

=== 2022 ===
North Carolina House of Representatives 107th district Democratic primary election, 2022
Party	Candidate	Votes	%
Democratic	Kelly Alexander (incumbent)	5,602	83.50%
Democratic	Vermanno Bowman	1,107	16.50%
Total votes		6,709	100%

North Carolina House of Representatives 107th district general election, 2022
Party	Candidate	Votes	%
Democratic	Kelly Alexander (incumbent)	18,896	81.86%
Republican	Mark Alan Cook	4,187	18.14%
Total votes		23,083	100%
Democratic hold			

=== 2020 ===
North Carolina House of Representatives 107th district general election, 2020
Party	Candidate	Votes	%
Democratic	Kelly Alexander (incumbent)	37,421	81.33%
Republican	Richard Rivette	8,591	18.67%
Total votes		46,012	100%
Democratic hold			

=== 2018 ===
North Carolina House of Representatives 107th district general election, 2018
Party	Candidate	Votes	%
Democratic	Kelly Alexander (incumbent)	24,453	100%
Total votes		24,453	100%
Democratic hold			

=== 2016 ===
North Carolina House of Representatives 107th district Democratic primary election, 2016
Party	Candidate	Votes	%
Democratic	Kelly Alexander (incumbent)	10,304	90.14%
Democratic	Robert Blok	1,127	9.86%
Total votes		11,431	100%

North Carolina House of Representatives 107th district general election, 2016
Party	Candidate	Votes	%
Democratic	Kelly Alexander (incumbent)	34,305	100%
Total votes		34,305	100%
Democratic hold			

=== 2014 ===
North Carolina House of Representatives 107th district general election, 2014
Party	Candidate	Votes	%
Democratic	Kelly Alexander (incumbent)	18,049	100%
Total votes		18,049	100%
Democratic hold			

=== 2012 ===
North Carolina House of Representatives 107th district general election, 2012
Party	Candidate	Votes	%
Democratic	Kelly Alexander (incumbent)	32,275	100%
Total votes		32,275	100%
Democratic hold			

=== 2010 ===
North Carolina House of Representatives 107th district general election, 2010
Party	Candidate	Votes	%
Democratic	Kelly Alexander (incumbent)	13,132	67.26%
Republican	Debbie Ware	6,392	32.74%
Total votes		19,524	100%
Democratic hold			

=== 2008 ===
North Carolina House of Representatives 107th district Democratic primary election, 2008
Party	Candidate	Votes	%
Democratic	Kelly Alexander	8,542	63.53%
Democratic	Mary Nixon Richardson	4,903	36.47%
Total votes		13,445	100%

North Carolina House of Representatives 107th district general election, 2008
Party	Candidate	Votes	%
Democratic	Kelly Alexander	27,502	75.26%
Republican	Gary Hardee	9,043	24.74%
Total votes		36,545	100%
Democratic hold			

=== 2006 ===
North Carolina House of Representatives 107th district general election, 2006
Party	Candidate	Votes	%
Democratic	Pete Cunningham (incumbent)	7,826	100%
Total votes		7,826	100%
Democratic hold			

=== 2004 ===
North Carolina House of Representatives 107th district general election, 2004
Party	Candidate	Votes	%
Democratic	Pete Cunningham (incumbent)	16,807	68.20%
Republican	Kenny Houck	7,836	31.80%
Total votes		24,643	100%
Democratic hold			

=== 2002 ===
North Carolina House of Representatives District 107th district general election, 2002
Party	Candidate	Votes	%
Democratic	Pete Cunningham (incumbent)	11,490	100%
Total votes		11,490	100%
Democratic hold			
