= Aisha Dew =

American politician

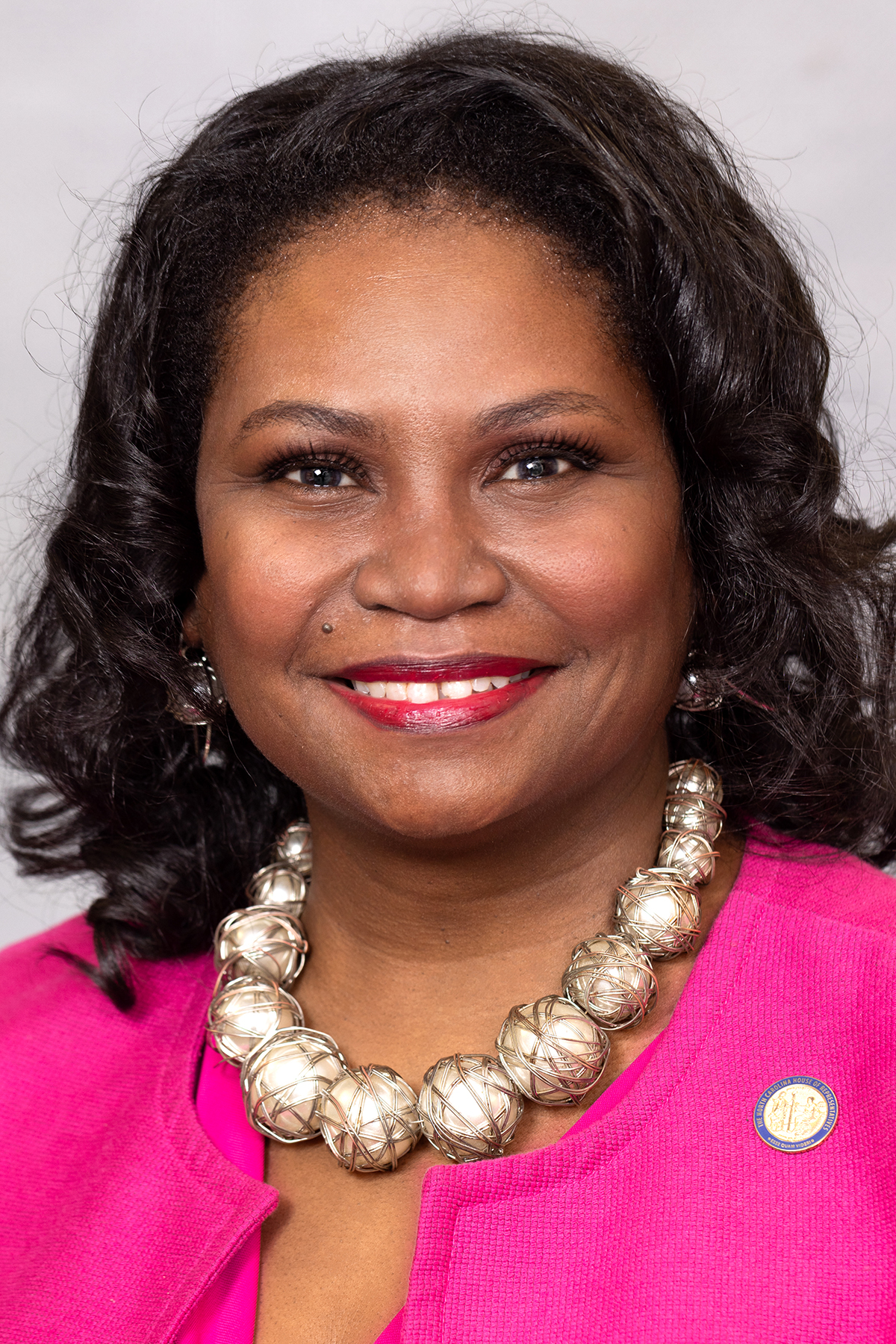

Member of the North Carolina House of Representatives from the 107th district
- Incumbent
- Assumed office January 1, 2025
- Preceded by: Bobby Drakeford

Personal details
- Born: Charlotte, North Carolina, U.S.
- Party: Democratic
- Education: Salem College
- Website: www.aishadew.com

Aisha O. Dew is a Democratic member of the North Carolina House of Representatives. She has represented the 107th district since 2025. She's a member of the Progressive House Caucus.

== Biography ==
Aisha Dew was born and raised in Charlotte, North Carolina and attended Salem College. She was a state director for the Bernie Sanders 2016 presidential campaign.
