= Sherrilyn Ifill =

American lawyer (born 1962)

- Ifill in 2026

President and Director-Counsel of the NAACP Legal Defense and Educational Fund
- In office 2012–2022
- Preceded by: John Payton
- Succeeded by: Janai Nelson

Personal details
- Born: December 17, 1962 (age 63) New York City, New York, U.S.
- Relatives: Gwen Ifill (cousin)
- Education: Vassar College (AB); New York University (JD)

Sherrilyn Ifill (born December 17, 1962) is an American attorney and the Vernon E. Jordan, Jr., Esq. Endowed Chair in Civil Rights (Vernon E. Jordan) at Howard University. She is a law professor and the former president and director-counsel of the NAACP Legal Defense Fund. She was the seventh president of the Legal Defense Fund, an organization that Thurgood Marshall founded in 1940. Ifill is a nationally recognized expert on voting rights and judicial selection. In 2021, Time named her one of the 100 most influential people in the world on its annual Time 100 list. In 2025, she was elected to the American Philosophical Society.

== Early life and education ==
Sherrilyn Ifill was born on December 17, 1962, in Queens, New York to Myrtle and Lester Ifill. She is the youngest of ten children. Her mother died when she was six years old. A graduate of Hillcrest High School, Ifill was awarded an A.B. from Vassar College and a J.D. from New York University School of Law.

She and the late PBS NewsHour anchor Gwen Ifill were first cousins whose family immigrated to the U.S. from Barbados. Their fathers were brothers and both of them became African Methodist Episcopal ministers.

== Career ==
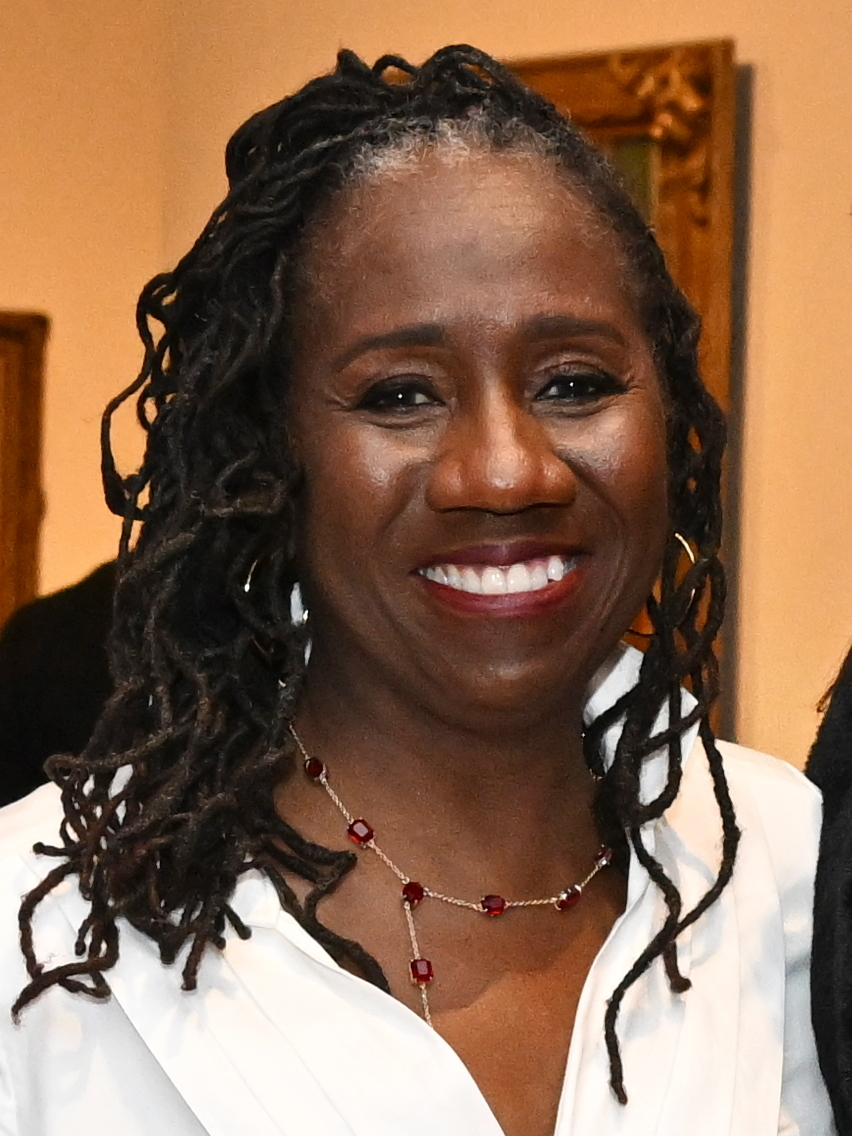

While in law school, Ifill interned for Judge A. Leon Higginbotham Jr. during her first summer break and during her second summer break, at the United Nations Centre for Human Rights. Her first job out of law school was a one-year fellowship with the American Civil Liberties Union in New York. She then served as assistant counsel at the NAACP Legal Defense Fund, litigating Voting Rights Act cases including the landmark Houston Lawyers' Association v. Attorney General of Texas. In 1993, she joined the faculty of the University of Maryland Law School, where she taught for two decades. She is the author of On the Courthouse Lawn: Confronting the Legacy of Lynching in the 21st Century, a 2008 finalist for the Hurston/Wright Legacy Award for Nonfiction. In 2013, she became the president and director-counsel of the Legal Defense Fund. She is the Steven and Maureen Klinsky Visiting Professor of Practice for Leadership and Progress at Harvard Law School, 2023-2024.

Ifill regularly appears in the media for her expertise on topics such as affirmative action, policing, judicial nominees, and the Supreme Court. Ifill announced that she would step down from the role of president and director-counsel of the Legal Defense Fund in the spring of 2022, to be replaced by Janai Nelson, then the associate director-counsel at LDF. Ifill joined the Ford Foundation as a Senior Fellow in June 2022. Her writing appears in The New York Review of Books, Salon, The Washington Post, and The New York Times.

In June 2023, Ifill was appointed inaugural Vernon E. Jordan, Jr., Esq. Endowed Chair in Civil Rights at Howard Law School. In March 2025, Howard University launched the 14th Amendment Center for Law and Democracy, which Ifill leads.

Ifill authors a newsletter that focuses on civil rights and American democracy, Sherrilyn’s Newsletter, which is published on Substack.

== Personal life ==
Ifill is married to Ivo Knobloch. They have three children.

== Honors and awards ==
In 2016, Ifill won the Society of American Law Teachers Great Teacher Award.

Ifill was an American Academy of Arts and Sciences Fellow in 2019. In 2020, Glamour magazine gave her a Woman of the Year award, calling her a "civil rights superhero". In 2021, Ifill was included on the Time 100, the Time annual list of the 100 most influential people in the world.

She was selected as the New York State Bar Association 2023 Gold Medal Award recipient, which cited Ifill's history as a "tireless warrior for civil rights".

She was awarded the Brandeis Medal in 2023.

== See also ==
- Joe Biden Supreme Court candidates
