= Janai Nelson =

American lawyer

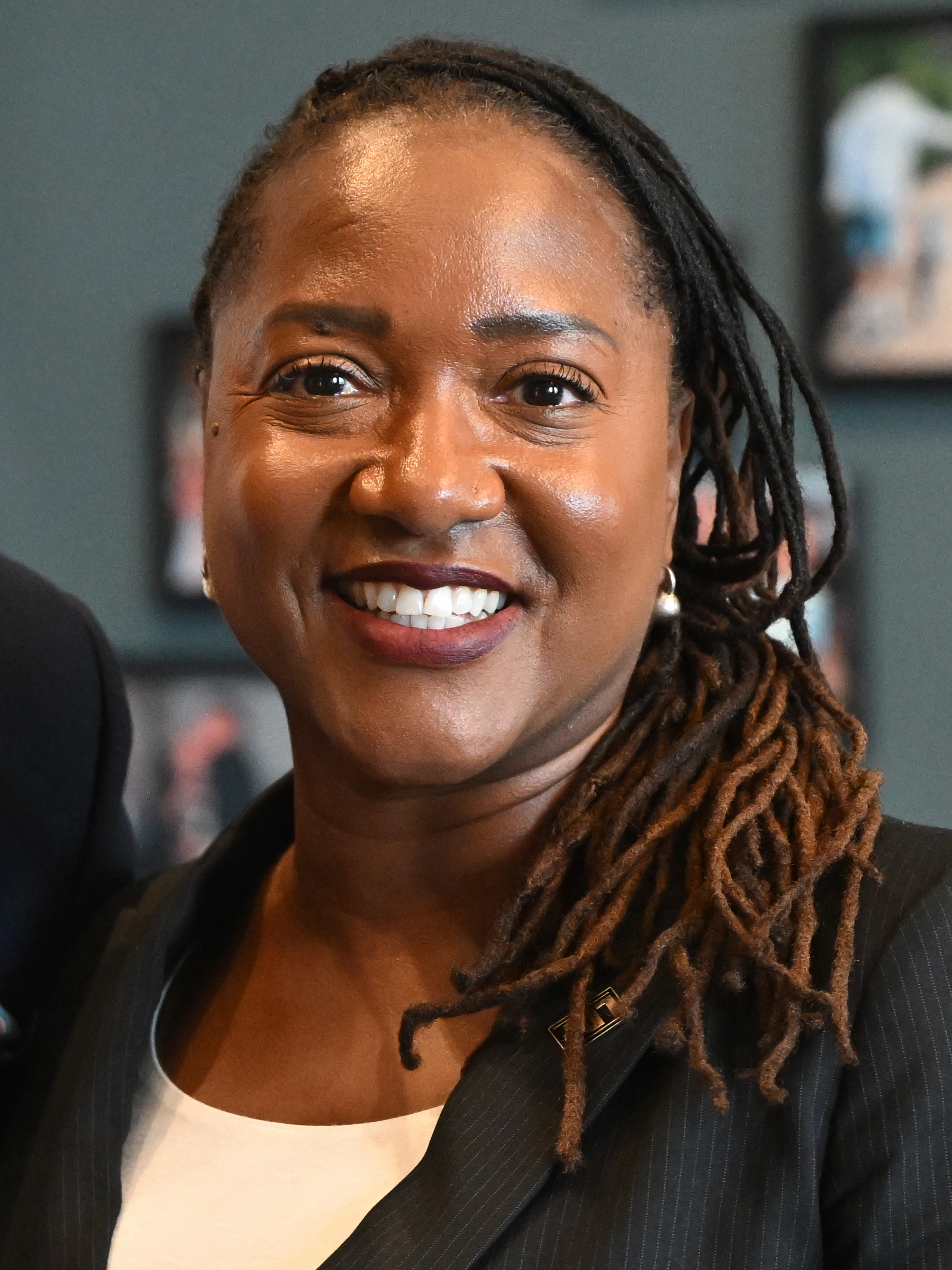
- Nelson in 2026

President and Director-Counsel of the NAACP Legal Defense and Educational Fund
- Incumbent
- Assumed office March 2022
- Preceded by: Sherrilyn Ifill

Personal details
- Born: 1971 (age 54–55)
- Education: New York University (BA); University of California, Los Angeles (JD)

Janai Nelson (born 1971) is an American lawyer, who currently serves as the President and Director-Counsel of the NAACP Legal Defense Fund (LDF). She has argued cases concerning voting rights, capital murder, and discrimination in academia. She also served as a professor of Law.

== Career ==
=== Education and early career ===
Nelson earned her B.A. from New York University and her J.D. from UCLA School of Law in 1996. After law school, she served as a law clerk for Judge David H. Coar of the U.S. District Court for the Northern District of Illinois and then for Judge Theodore McMillian of the U.S. Court of Appeals for the Eighth Circuit.

=== LDF Lawyer (First Tenure) ===
Nelson began her civil rights career at LDF, first as an extern in 1995 while a student at UCLA School of Law, then as a recipient of the prestigious Fried Frank-LDF Fellowship in 1998 until she was hired as an Assistant Counsel by LDF's first Female President and Director-Counsel Elaine Jones. Nelson went on to lead LDF's Political Participation Group, including the entire voting rights and redistricting docket, felony disenfranchisement, and voter suppression matters.

During her initial tenure at LDF, her notable cases included Hayden v. Pataki, a challenge to New York's felon disenfranchisement scheme in which she argued before the Second Circuit en banc and served as lead counsel. She was also on the team that represented African- and Haitian-American voters in NAACP v. Hood in a voter suppression challenge following the Bush v. Gore presidential election. She also served as counsel in a capital case before the Supreme Court of the United States, Banks v. Dretke.

Nelson left LDF after being named a Fulbright Scholar to conduct research in Ghana, West Africa.

=== Teaching and scholarship ===
Nelson spent nearly 10 years in academia, where she became a full professor and was the Associate Dean for Faculty Scholarship and Associate Director of Ronald H. Brown Center for Civil Rights and Economic Development at St. John's University School of Law. While in the academy, Nelson was honored with the Derrick A. Bell Award from the American Association of Law Schools Section on Minority Groups and was named one of Lawyers of Color's 50 Under 50 minority professors making an impact in legal education. Nelson taught classes on topics such as Election Law and Political Participation, Comparative Election Law, Voting Rights, Professional Responsibility, Constitutional Law. Nelson's scholarship focuses on domestic and comparative election law, race, and democratic theory, and her work has been published in numerous law journals and popular publications.

== LDF Lawyer (Second Tenure) ==
Nelson returned to LDF in 2014 as its Associate Director-Counsel, after being recruited by President and Director-Counsel Sherrilyn Ifill. A member of the litigation and policy teams, Nelson was lead counsel in Veasey v. Abbott (2018), a successful federal challenge to Texas' discriminatory voter ID law, and was the lead architect of National Urban League, et al. v. Trump (2020), which sought to declare President Trump's Executive Order banning diversity, equity, and inclusion training in the workplace unconstitutional before it was later rescinded by President Biden.

In 2021, Nelson represented Professor Nikole Hannah-Jones in a lawsuit against the University of North Carolina Board of Regents concerning its decision to deny and delay awarding her tenure when promoting her to the Knight Chair in Race and Investigative Reporting.

Nelson has also helped to steward some of LDF's developments in the past seven years, including launching the Marshall-Motley Scholars Program. The MMSP, named in honor of the nation's first Black Supreme Court Justice and LDF founder Thurgood Marshall, and civil rights litigator Constance Baker Motley, is a multi-year commitment to endow the South with committed, prepared civil rights lawyers trained to provide legal advocacy. Nelson also helped launch the Thurgood Marshall Institute.

In October 2025, Nelson argued before the U.S. Supreme Court in the redistricting case Louisiana v. Callais. The court rejected her argument in its ruling in April of 2026.

== Awards ==
Nelson received the 2013 Derrick A. Bell Award from the Association of American Law Schools (AALS) Section on Minority Groups. That same year, she was also named one of Lawyers of Color's 50 Under 50 minority professors making an impact on legal education. Nelson was named Alumni of the Year in 2025 by UCLA School of Law, Black Law Students Association. She was also awarded the Distinguished Alumni Award by New York University in 2025. Nelson received the M. Ashley Dickerson award by the National Association of Women Lawyers in 2025. Nelson was also named Public Servant of the Year Award by the Metropolitan Black Bar Association in 2025. She also received the Trailblazer Awardfrom the George W. Crawford Black Bar Association in 2025. Nelson received an Honorary Doctorate of Law degree from Suffolk University Law School in 2023.
