= Alexander Funeral Home =

Funeral home in North Carolina

The Alexander Funeral Home is the oldest African American owned business in Mecklenburg County, North Carolina.

Alexander Funeral Home was founded by Zechariah Alexander in 1914 when Alexander bought half of Coles and Smith Undertakes. In 1927 Alexander purchased the remaining part of the business and changed the name to the Alexander Funeral Home. The business passed through the family with Kelly Alexander Sr and Zechariah Alexander Jr both making careers out of the business.

The funeral home became a sort of gathering place for civil rights activists and leaders in the community. Frederick Alexander became the first African American on the Charlotte City Council, Kelly Alexander Sr served as Chairman of the NAACP, Louis Alexander worked with the United States Postal Service and Kelly Alexander Jr became a North Carolina State Representative.

Today the business is locally owned with members of the Alexander family overseeing the running of the company.
