= Reginald Hawkins =

American civil rights activist (1923–2007)

Reginald Armistice Hawkins
- Born: 1923; Beaufort, North Carolina, United States
- Died: 2007 (aged 83–84)
- Education: Johnson C. Smith University; Howard University; Johnson C. Smith Theological Seminary
- Occupations: dentist, civil rights activist

Reginald Armistice Hawkins (1923–2007) was an American civil rights activist and dentist. He was the first African-American to run for Governor of North Carolina. He fought to desegregate Charlotte schools and businesses.

== Early life ==
Reginald Hawkins was born in Beaufort, North Carolina, in 1923. He served as captain in the US Army during World War II. After completing his time in the service, he graduated from Johnson C. Smith University in 1943, where he also became a member of Kappa Alpha Psi fraternity. He earned a degree in dentistry from Howard University in 1948. Returning to Charlotte, Hawkins went on to earn a Bachelor (1956) and then Master of Divinity (1973) from the Presbyterian affiliated Johnson C. Smith Theological Seminary. He married Catherine Richardson, also a JCSU alumnus, while he was still in dental school and they had four children.

== Civil rights advocacy ==
Hawkins and members of the NAACP differed over the best way to end school desegregation. Kelly Alexander wanted to sue the city of Charlotte over civil injustice. Hawkins believed that a confrontational approach was best through utilizing media coverage to help mobilize citizens, arguing "The only way to move forward is to engage bigots in direct controversy within their own community. In order to make his point about the only way to move forward, Hawkins escorted Dorothy Counts, a young black girl to Harding High School, a white school in Charlotte. On September 4, 1957 Hawkins and Counts walked through a shower of spit and insults to integrate the first Mecklenburg County School. His actions that day created a lot of stir in both the white and African-American neighborhoods, creating a national name for Hawkins. From then on Hawkins became a prominent civil rights activist in Charlotte. In 1961 Hawkins led a boycott of Irwin Avenue Junior High School. He urged African-American students to stay home instead of attending a second-rate educational institution.

Due to his disagreement with NAACP policies and in an attempt to distance himself from their "communist" label, Hawkins resigned his membership in 1958 and created the Mecklenburg Organization for Political Affairs (MOPA). MOPA used community activists within the African-American community to call for desegregation. Members took part in marches, picketing, protests, boycotts, and sit-in's, usually near schools or hospitals in the Charlotte area. Hawkins work helped successfully integrate many restaurants downtown including those in Belk's and Ivey's department stores.

In 1962 Hawkins filed suit against the North Carolina Dental Society for discrimination due to the fact they would not let him practice at Charlotte Memorial Hospital. He frequently led demonstrations outside the Mercy, Charlotte Memorial, Presbyterian and Good Samaritan hospitals in the Charlotte area. These demonstrations usually attracted a lot of press and generated controversy in the medical community. Hawkins continued to protest by writing Attorney General Robert Kennedy claiming that the hospitals were breaking their nondiscrimination policy that was one of the conditions of them receiving federal funding. By the end of 1962 the Department of Health ordered Memorial to desegregate their maternity and dentistry wards. Hawkins continued to protest until 1963 when the hospital declared an open-door policy for all patients.

On November 22, 1965, four bombs exploded across Charlotte in the span of about 15 minutes. Hawkins' home was hit as well as the homes of Kelly Alexander Sr, president of the NAACP, Fred Alexander, first African American City Council man, and Julius Chambers, a civil rights lawyer. The bombings caught the attention of the local news and put Charlotte into the violent category that cities like Birmingham and Jackson had already been placed in. No one was ever arrested for the bombings even though there was a statewide manhunt, and the FBI still holds an open file on the event. Many people believe the bombings were resistance to efforts of desegregation that all four men were part of.

He also helped organize the 1963 March on Washington and was a great friend to Martin Luther King Jr. King was originally scheduled to stop in Charlotte and speak at one of Hawkins' campaign events, but changed his plans and went to Memphis instead, where he was assassinated only a few days later.

== Politics ==
In 1968 Hawkins announced his campaign for governor of North Carolina. His political actions had earned him many friends but also many enemies. He lost the Democratic primary to Robert W. Scott in a three-way race, earning 18.52% of the vote; Scott went on to win the election. He ran for governor again in 1972 and lost in the Democratic primary, winning 8.16% of the vote in a six-way race; the winner of the primary, Skipper Bowles, lost in the general election to Republican candidate James Holshouser.

Throughout his life Hawkins was an ardent supporter of equal rights and integration. He continued his work, giving speeches and calling for change right up until his death in 2007.
