= John Payton =

American civil rights attorney

President of the NAACP Legal Defense and Educational Fund
- In office 2008–2012
- Preceded by: Ted Shaw
- Succeeded by: Sherrilyn Ifill

Corporation Counsel of the District of Columbia
- In office 1991–1994
- Mayor: Sharon Pratt
- Preceded by: Beverly Burke (acting)
- Succeeded by: Vanessa Ruiz

Personal details
- Born: December 27, 1946 Los Angeles, California, U.S.
- Died: March 22, 2012 (aged 65) Baltimore, Maryland, U.S.
- Education: Pomona College (BA); Harvard University (JD)

John A. Payton (December 27, 1946 – March 22, 2012) was an African-American civil rights attorney. In 2008, he was appointed the sixth president and director-counsel of the NAACP Legal Defense Fund serving in that post until his death. Prior to this, he was a partner at the law firm WilmerHale for 20 years.

Payton was tapped to be the lead counsel for the University of Michigan in defending its law and undergraduate schools' use of race in their admissions processes. For more than six years, Payton handled the two high-profile cases in the trial court and in the court of appeals, and argued Gratz v. Bollinger before the Supreme Court of the United States.

== Early life and education ==
Payton grew up in Los Angeles, California, where he graduated from high school. He attended Pomona College in Claremont, California, where he became heavily involved in civil rights and anti-war protests. Payton was one of the founders of Pomona's Black Student Association. For three years, Payton served as an admissions officer at the Claremont Colleges, a position that he helped create to recruit black students. He graduated in 1973. He left the admissions position after receiving a Watson fellowship, which allowed him to study literature in West Africa for a year and, while abroad, he applied to law school.

After being accepted at and entering Harvard Law School, Payton worked on several civil rights cases and was a member of the editorial board for the Harvard Civil Rights and Civil Liberties Law Review. He graduated from law school in 1977.

== Early career ==
Following law school, Payton spent a year clerking for then-U.S. District Court for the Northern District of California Judge Cecil Poole. He then moved to Washington, D.C. where he was recruited to Wilmer, Cutler & Pickering (now known as WilmerHale) by James Robertson.

While at the firm, Payton worked on several important civil rights cases. He successfully defended the NAACP against an anti-trust lawsuit brought by white merchants in Mississippi who had lost business in the wake of a 1966 desegregation boycott.

In City of Richmond v. J.A. Croson Co., Payton unsuccessfully defended the city's set-aside affirmative action plan established to assist minority businesses in receiving city construction contracts. He argued the case in the Supreme Court of the United States where the Court narrowly ruled against the city and determined, for the first time, that all government uses of race - including affirmative action programs - would be subject to strict scrutiny.

== D.C. corporation counsel and South Africa election observer ==
When Sharon Pratt Dixon was elected mayor of Washington, D.C. in 1991, Vernon Jordan tapped Payton to become the District's corporation counsel. As corporation counsel, he reorganized, centralized and streamlined the corporation counsel offices. Early in his term, Payton dealt with the aftermath of the Mount Pleasant riots and worked to improve Latino and police relations in the city. He also participated in balancing the city's budget in the face of a major crisis.

In 1993, President Bill Clinton nominated Payton to head the U.S. Department of Justice's Civil Rights Division. Following objections from the Congressional Black Caucus and despite some prominent African-American support for Payton, Payton withdrew his name for consideration.

In 1994 Payton left the D.C. Corporation Counsel office to join his wife, Gay McDougall, in South Africa. Ms. McDougall was in South Africa working as a member of the Independent Electoral Commission, which ran South Africa's first democratic elections that year. Nelson Mandela was elected president. At the same time, Payton served on an international observer team that included lawyers from the Lawyers' Committee for Civil Rights Under Law. The couple remained in South Africa for several months before going back to D.C.

== Return to private practice and the Michigan cases ==
Returning to Wilmer, Cutler & Pickering, Payton took on a civil practice that included representing corporations in employment matters, the American Legacy Foundation in its efforts to prevent youths from smoking, and Fannie Mae in a major class action challenge.

While still at the firm, Payton was tapped to be the lead counsel for the University of Michigan in defending its law and undergraduate schools' use of race in their admissions processes. For more than six years, Payton handled the two high-profile cases in the trial court and in the court of appeals, and argued Gratz v. Bollinger before the Supreme Court. He organized a broad coalition from higher education, the military and top businesses in support of diversity initiatives. In a narrow decision in Grutter v. Bollinger, the Supreme Court upheld the use of race in college admissions.

Payton served as president of the District of Columbia Bar for one year in 2001. He also served as a visiting professor at Harvard Law School, Georgetown University Law Center and Howard University School of Law. He was repeatedly recognized by his peers and news outlets as one of the nation's top lawyers.

== Director Counsel of LDF ==
In 2008, Payton was appointed the sixth director-counsel and president of the NAACP Legal Defense and Educational Fund, Inc. following in the footsteps of such civil rights giants as Thurgood Marshall and Jack Greenberg.

== Legacy ==
The annual Payton Distinguished Lectureship at Pomona College, established in 2017, is named in his honor.

Legal offices
Preceded by Beverly Burke; Acting	Corporation Counsel of the District of Columbia; 1991–1994	Succeeded by Vanessa Ruiz
