= Bobby Drakeford =

American politician

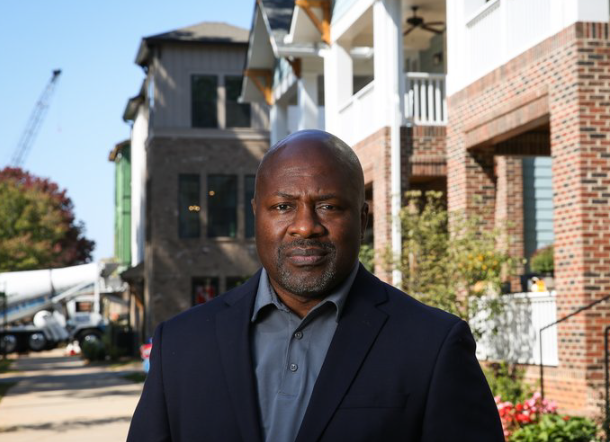

Member of the North Carolina House of Representatives from the 107th district
- In office September 24, 2024 – January 1, 2025
- Preceded by: Kelly Alexander
- Succeeded by: Aisha Dew

Personal details
- Party: Democratic
- Education: Elon University (BS); Wake Forest University (MBA); University of North Carolina School of Law (JD)

Robert T. Drakeford is an American businessman and politician, who previously served in the North Carolina House of Representatives representing the 107th district, covering north Charlotte and southwest Huntersville. A Democrat, he was appointed to the seat on September 24, 2024, following the death of incumbent Kelly Alexander.

== Early life and education ==
Drakeford grew up in west Charlotte. His father, Robert Drakeford, was the first African American mayor of Carrboro, North Carolina. Drakeford graduated from Elon University with a Bachelor of Science in accounting. He went on to earn a Master of Business Administration from Wake Forest University and a Juris Doctor from the University of North Carolina School of Law.

== Career ==
Drakeford is the founder and CEO of real estate and development firm the Drakeford Company.

== North Carolina House of Representatives ==
Following Kelly Alexander's death, Drakeford was unanimously nominated by the Mecklenburg County Democratic Party Executive Committee to fill the vacancy. He assumed office on September 24, 2024, and did not run for a full term in the 2024 North Carolina House of Representatives election.

North Carolina House of Representatives
Preceded by Kelly Alexander	Member of the North Carolina House of Representatives from the 107th district 2024–2025	Succeeded by Aisha Dew
