= W. Pete Cunningham =

American politician

Pete Cunningham

Member of the North Carolina House of Representatives
- In office January 1, 1987 – January 1, 2009
- Preceded by: James Franklin Richardson
- Succeeded by: Kelly Alexander
- Constituency: 59th District (1987–2003); 107th District (2003–2009)

Personal details
- Born: William Pete Cunningham; November 7, 1929 Union County, North Carolina
- Died: December 21, 2010 (aged 81) Charlotte, North Carolina
- Party: Democratic
- Occupation: real estate investor

William Pete Cunningham (November 7, 1929 – December 21, 2010) was a Democratic member of the North Carolina General Assembly representing the 107th House district, including constituents in Mecklenburg county. He resigned on December 31, 2007, in his 11th term.

Cunningham worked with Robert F. Williams and the Monroe County chapter of the NAACP in the 1950s and 1960s. He served in the US Navy, (Ret.) for 16 years, (Submarine) US Army Paratrooper for 4 years. He was also a real estate investor in Charlotte, North Carolina.

== Electoral history ==
=== 2006 ===
North Carolina House of Representatives 107th district general election, 2006
Party	Candidate	Votes	%
Democratic	Pete Cunningham (incumbent)	7,826	100%
Total votes		7,826	100%
Democratic hold			

=== 2004 ===
North Carolina House of Representatives 107th district general election, 2004
Party	Candidate	Votes	%
Democratic	Pete Cunningham (incumbent)	16,807	68.20%
Republican	Kenny Houck	7,836	31.80%
Total votes		24,643	100%
Democratic hold			

=== 2002 ===
North Carolina House of Representatives District 107th district general election, 2002
Party	Candidate	Votes	%
Democratic	Pete Cunningham (incumbent)	11,490	100%
Total votes		11,490	100%
Democratic hold			

=== 2000 ===
North Carolina House of Representatives 59th district general election, 2000
Party	Candidate	Votes	%
Democratic	Pete Cunningham (incumbent)	13,658	100%
Total votes		13,658	100%
Democratic hold			

North Carolina House of Representatives
Preceded by James Franklin Richardson	Member of the North Carolina House of Representatives from the 59th district 1987–2003	Succeeded by Maggie Jeffus
Preceded by Constituency established	Member of the North Carolina House of Representatives from the 107th district 2003–2009	Succeeded by Kelly Alexander
