= Frederick D. Alexander =

American politician (1910–1980)

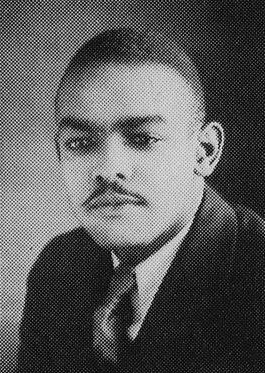
- Alexander in the Lincoln University yearbook, 1931
- Born: February 21, 1910
- Died: April 13, 1980 (aged 70)
- Education: Lincoln University of Pennsylvania
- Occupation: Businessman

Frederick Douglas Alexander (February 21, 1910 – April 13, 1980) was an American businessman, civil rights activist, and politician from Charlotte, North Carolina. Elected to the Charlotte City Council in 1965, he was the first African American to serve on it since the 1890s. He was repeatedly re-elected, serving until 1974. That year he was elected to the State Senate, serving into 1980. He was also active in local business, community and civil rights organizations, establishing a reputation as a moderate.

The state of North Carolina had passed measures at the turn of the 20th century to raise barriers to voter registration, and excluded African Americans for decades from the political system. Restrictions had begun to ease in cities such as Charlotte even before national civil rights legislation was passed in the mid-1960s.

== Early life and education ==
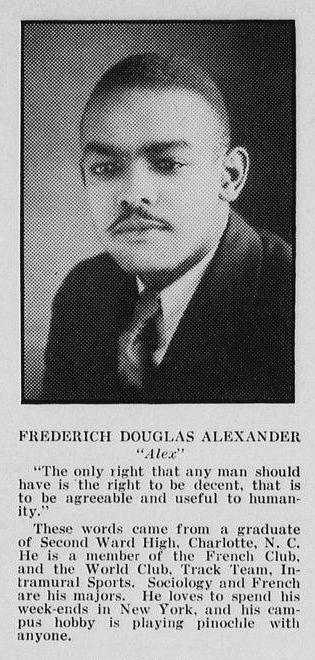
Alexander in the Lincoln University yearbook, 1931

Alexander was born in Charlotte, North Carolina and was the son of Zechariah Alexander and his wife. His father was a prominent African-American businessman and district manager of the North Carolina Mutual Life Insurance Company and owner of the Alexander Funeral Home. Frederick's brother Kelly Alexander eventually became a national leader for the NAACP. Alexander graduated from Charlotte's Second Ward High School in 1926. He attended college at Lincoln University of Pennsylvania, a historically black college. Upon his graduation in 1931, Alexander returned to Charlotte to work at his father's funeral home.

== Political career ==
In addition to working with his father in the family business, Alexander began to get active politically. First he worked to organize voter registration drives among Charlotte's African-American population. The state had passed a new constitution in 1900 that raised barriers to voter registration in order to disenfranchise blacks, whether educated or not.

By Alexander's time, some cities such as Charlotte had eased their subjective administration of voter registration, and approved some educated African Americans as voters. During the Great Depression, when some opportunities opened for African Americans, Alexander worked to gain hiring of black city police officers and US mail carriers. He stressed education, advocating business courses in black high schools (the public school system was segregated), and better health care in the community.

While the police and postal positions were nominally part of the civil service of the city and federal government, Charlotte had managed to restrict them to whites. The first black policemen were not hired until 1941, when two were selected. They were put in a special category, not covered by the civil service nor allowed to bear arms. By 1948 six additional black officers had been hired, as the Veteran Welfare Association of Charlotte, made up of World War II veterans, had pressed for change; all were treated as regular civil service officers.

In 1948 Alexander was a founding member and served as executive secretary for the Citizens Committee for Political Action in Charlotte. That year it sponsored two African-American candidates for the school board and city council. But in 1932 the city council had changed its method of election for those positions from single-member districts to at-large voting, after a black man was nearly elected to the City Council from a majority-black district. This required each candidate to gain support from a majority of voters. As the city was two-thirds white, most black political candidates were unable to gain enough votes for victory.

But Alexander continued his civil rights work, gaining a reputation as a moderate leader. He was a charter member of the Charlotte Mecklenburg Council on Human Relations, was elected to the Southern Regional Council, and served on the United Community Services committee. At the same time, Charlotte was changing. In 1957 the school board decided to proceed with accepting some black students to formerly all-white schools, following the ruling of the US Supreme Court in 1954 that segregated public schools were unconstitutional. Three students persisted despite hostility and hostile demonstrations but leaders of the business community were very distressed about the negative picture portrayed about the city of Charlotte.

In 1962, Alexander, representing his family business, became the first African-American member of the Charlotte Chamber of Commerce. He was appointed to the Mecklenburg County Board of Public Welfare one year later. To take a leadership role, in May 1963 the Chamber of Commerce passed a resolution for businesses to integrate, and voluntary integration was undertaken in the city and Mecklenburg County. Business leaders had decided it was time to make Charlotte a progressive city on racial issues, in order to promote good business.

In 1964 Alexander was selected as a member of the Executive Committee of the Mecklenburg County Democratic Party. After passage of the Civil Rights Act that year and the Voting Rights Act the following year, he helped organize voter registration again and other initiatives.

In 1965 he ran for and won a seat on the Charlotte City Council, becoming the first African American to serve on the Council since the 1890s. At the time, one-third of the city's population was African American. As a candidate, Alexander stressed "his desire not to be considered ‘the Negro candidate,’ but rather as a man who will work for the good of the entire community,” as quoted in The Charlotte Observer.

Alexander served for nine years on the council, helping pass several anti-discrimination ordinances. He achieved removal of the fence that separated areas of the segregated Elmwood-Pinewood cemetery, and other improvements to the city cemetery. Built in the 1930s, the city cemeteries had a partition dividing them, which remained even after the city initiated voluntary integration of businesses before passage of the Civil Rights Act. Alexander's initial proposal to City Council to remove the fence resulted in their deciding to have a vote on the issue. In July 1968, the initial vote failed to pass. It was approved on January 6, 1969, when one councilman was absent and Mayor Stan Brookshire cast the decided vote in favor of the proposal.

The following day, Alexander oversaw removal of the fence, remarking that when he was elected, "the Negro cemetery had no paved streets, was weedgrown and filled with trash... unprotected by fences on the outside." Along with ground maintenance and erection of a perimeter fence, Alexander was instrumental in having Pinewood's streets paved and closing the cemetery's Ninth Street entrance, in order to allow African Americans to enter through the main gate like all other patrons. One historian regarded the removal of the fence as a pivotal moment for Alexander, when he asserted himself as a councilman. His efforts had "initiated a symbolic gesture that said not only to black Charlotteans, but whites as well, that the barriers of segregation belong to a bygone era."

Some residents had sent letters or otherwise complained of the proposal, citing fears that African Americans would steal funerary decorations from white graves, whites would be subject to assault in an open cemetery, or white ancestors buried there would object. But the fence was removed and the cemeteries were united.

Alexander also gained city council approval to construct a fire station for northwest Charlotte, a majority-African American neighborhood that had been underserved. He gained support to preserve the Thompson Orphanage Chapel. Alexander worked to increase African-American representation in the city by appointments to various committees and governmental boards.

On November 22, 1965, the homes of four black leaders in Charlotte were bombed in a terrorist attack: Alexander, his brother Kelly Alexander, Julius Chambers, and Reginald Hawkins, were all targeted, apparently to discourage their civil rights activities. No one was killed by the blasts. The terrorists were never caught, and no group claimed the attack.

Alexander was elected to the North Carolina Senate in 1974 as a representative of district 22. While senator he served as vice chair of the Higher Education Committee. In 1979 he introduced legislation calling for the second week in February to be designated as Black History Week in North Carolina. He was also part of the NAACP, the North Carolina Good Neighbor Council, Governor's Committee on Law and Order, and was president of the Mint Museum of Art from 1978 to 1979.

On April 13, 1980, Alexander died. He was buried at York Memorial Park in Charlotte.
