= Margaret Bush Wilson =

American activist (1919–2009)

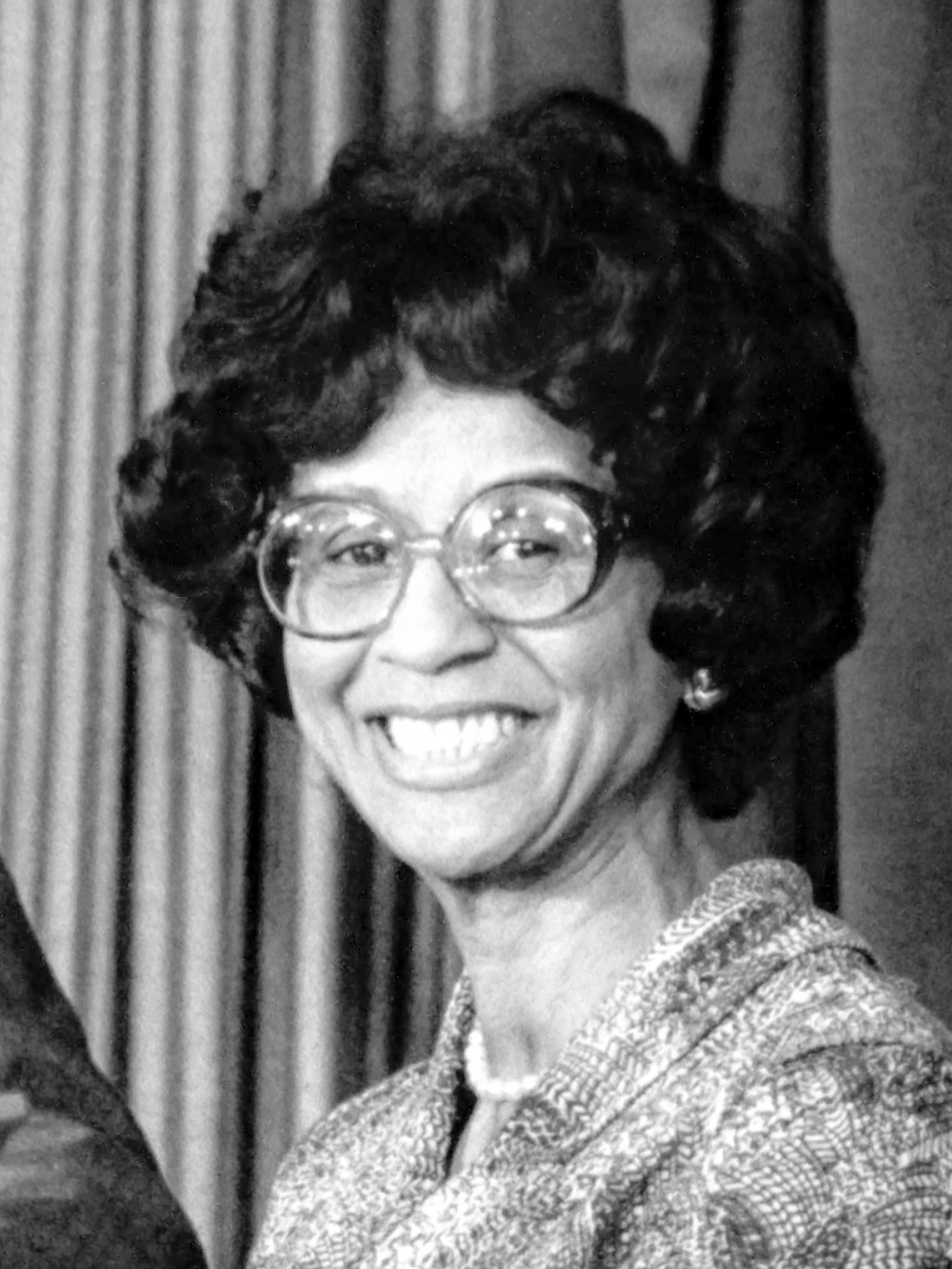

Chair of the National Association for the Advancement of Colored People
- In office 1975–1983
- Preceded by: Stephen Gill Spottswood
- Succeeded by: Kelly Alexander Sr.

Personal details
- Born: Margaret Bush; January 30, 1919 St. Louis, Missouri, U.S.
- Died: August 11, 2009 (aged 90) St. Louis, Missouri, U.S.
- Spouse: Robert Wilson
- Education: Talladega College (BA); Lincoln University (LLB)

Margaret Bush Wilson (January 30, 1919 – August 11, 2009) was an American lawyer and activist. Wilson broke many barriers as an African-American woman throughout her professional career.

== Biography ==
Born in St. Louis, Missouri, she successfully managed the St. Louis law firm for more than 40 years. Wilson completed her undergraduate degree in economics at Talladega College. She graduated with honors in 1940, after studying in India for six months, as a recipient of the Juliette Derricotte Fellowship, which had been established by Sue Bailey Thurman. While in India, she met Jawaharlal Nehru, Rabindranath Tagore, and Mohandas Gandhi.

Wilson was one of two women in the second class of the Lincoln University of Missouri School of Law. She was the second African-American woman that passed the bar and licensed to practice in Missouri in 1943.

In 1946, Wilson's father, James T. Bush, a real estate broker, was instrumental in helping the J. D. Shelley family buy a home. The family was later ordered out of the home when the Missouri Supreme Court ruled that the racially restrictive covenant governing the property was enforceable. Mrs. Wilson was counsel for the Real Estate Brokers Association, which was formed at her father's initiative to take the case to the U.S. Supreme Court. In 1948, the Supreme Court ruled in Shelley v. Kraemer that such covenants were unenforceable in the courts.

In 1948 Wilson became the first black woman in Missouri to run for Congress, running on the Progressive Party ticket. She lost the race and later joined the Democratic Party.

In 1954, Wilson celebrated with colleagues and friends when the Brown vs. Board of Education decision was handed down. The next year, her five-year-old son started kindergarten at one of the city's newly integrated schools.

Wilson's professional experience included serving as United States Attorney for the Rural Electrification Administration of the U.S. Department of Agriculture and Assistant Attorney General of Missouri.

In the late 1950s and early 1960s Wilson rose through the presidencies of the St. Louis and Missouri chapters of the NAACP, when activists began demonstrating in front of the Jefferson Bank & Trust and eventually forced St. Louis businesses to begin hiring blacks for previously all-white jobs. She was elected to the national board of the NAACP in 1963 and became the first woman to chair of the organization's National Board of Directors in 1975. After serving nine terms in that office, Wilson was involved in a dispute with the NAACP's executive director, Benjamin Hooks, alleging managerial incompetence after a 25% drop in membership, significant turnover of financial managers, and unpaid bills. Wilson alleged he refused to cooperate in an audit of the accounting system, so in May 1983 she unilaterally suspended Hooks for insubordination, improper conduct and noncooperation. The board reversed her action eight days later, stripped her of all but ceremonial duties and would deny her the chairman’s traditional right to speak at the NAACP’s annual convention. Six months later, she stood for reelection against a dead man nominated by the 64-member governing body. After her ouster from the NAACP leadership, Wilson returned to St. Louis and continued to practice law until her death.

In the 1980s she was critical of President Ronald Reagan and his administration's deep budget cuts. When she introduced him before his speech to the NAACP's 1981 national convention in Denver, she openly attacked him for reviving "war, pestilence, famine, and death," visibly upsetting Reagan and his wife Nancy Reagan.

She was Board Chair of two historically African-American colleges, St. Augustine's College and Talladega, and also served on numerous boards for national companies and nonprofit organizations. She was a trustee emerita of Washington University in St. Louis and Webster University, and was Chair of Law Day 2000 for the American Bar Association. In 1997, she received the Distinguished Lawyer Award from the Bar Association of Metropolitan St. Louis; Supreme Court Justice Clarence Thomas, who had stayed with Wilson while studying for the bar exam, attended the ceremony. Wilson died on August 11, 2009.
