= Johnson v. Railway Express Agency =

Us labor law case about discrimination

Johnson v Railway Express Agency, Inc
- Court: US Supreme Court
- Citation: 421 US 454 (1975)

Keywords
- Discrimination

Johnson v Railway Express Agency, Inc 421 US 454 (1975) is a US labor law case, concerning employment discrimination and the overlap between claims made under Section 1981 and under Title VII.

== Facts ==
Willie Johnson claimed that his employer, the Railway Express Agency, Inc in Memphis, Tennessee discriminated against him in seniority and job assignments. He filed with the EEOC a charge that the employer was discriminating against its Negro employees over seniority rules and job assignments. He also charged the labor unions, Brotherhood of Railway Clerks Tri-State Local and Brotherhood of Railway Clerks Lily of the Valley Local, were racially segregating memberships. Three weeks later he was fired, so Johnson added a claim of unlawful discriminatory termination. The EEOC issued reports around 2 years later favoring Johnson's complaint, but after this the District Court in Tennessee rejected the claim for being over the 1 year limit in its Statute of Limitations.

== Judgment ==
Blackmun J held that he was out of time, although it conceded that the old Enforcement Act of 1870 provided a remedy against private parties. He said the following:

Petitioner freely concedes that he could have filed his § 1981 action at any time after his cause of action accrued; in fact, we understand him to claim an unfettered right so to do. Thus, in a very real sense, petitioner has slept on his § 1981 rights. The fact that his slumber may have been induced by faith in the adequacy of his Title VII remedy is of little relevance inasmuch as the two remedies are truly independent. Moreover, since petitioner's Title VII court action now also appears to be time barred because of the peculiar procedural history of this case, petitioner, in effect, would have us extend the § 1981 cause of action well beyond the life of even his Title VII cause of action. We find no policy reason that excuses petitioner's failure to take the minimal steps necessary to preserve each claim independently.

Marshall J (Douglas J and Brennan J concurring) dissented with the following:

the Court emphasizes the importance of a full arsenal of weapons to combat unlawful employment discrimination in the private as well as the public sector. The majority stands on firm ground in recognizing that both remedies are available to victims of discriminatory practices. Accordingly, I concur in Parts I—III of the Court’s opinion. But, the Court stumbles in its analysis of the relation between the two statutes on the tolling question. The majority concludes that the filing of a Title VII charge with the Equal Employment Opportunity Commission (EEOC) does not toll the applicable statute of limitations.

== See also ==
- US labor law
