= Kemba Smith Pradia =

American prison reform activist

Kemba Niambi Smith Pradia (born Kemba Niambi Smith on August 28, 1971) is an American prison reform activist. She began a 24½ year sentence for drug-related charges in 1994, ultimately serving six years before being granted clemency by then-President Bill Clinton. Her advocacy work focuses on the intersection of mandatory minimum sentencing laws and race in America. She is the subject of a 2024 film titled "Kemba" which tells her story. On his last full day in office, President Joe Biden pardoned Smith Pradia of her conviction.

== Early life and education ==
Kemba Smith was born in Glen Allen, a suburb of Richmond, Virginia. She was the only child of her parents Gus and Odessa, an accountant and a teacher. Growing up, Smith was involved in many extracurriculars, including Girl Scouts and marching band. Raised in a middle class, majority-white environment, Smith decided to attend Hampton University, a historically Black college, after graduating from Hermitage High School in June 1989.

At college, Smith struggled with low self-esteem, became involved with the party scene, and her grades began to suffer. In 1992, her senior year at Hampton, she dropped out due to pressure from her abusive then-boyfriend Peter Hall (see below), transferred to Johnson C. Smith University, and after a semester transferred again to Central Piedmont Community College. Smith later enrolled at Virginia Commonwealth University.

After being released from prison, Smith Pradia went on to graduate from Virginia Union University with a bachelor's degree in social work in May 2002. She later graduated from law school.

== Arrest and prison sentence ==
At age 19, while attending Hampton University, Smith met Peter Hall, whom she began dating. Hall, who was nearly 28, was not a student at Hampton, but had been selling cocaine to students for two years by the time he met Smith. Hall "was a major figure in a $4 million crack cocaine ring" and went on to abuse her physically, mentally, and emotionally. By mid-1992, Smith had become involved in Hall's drug ring in "a number of supporting roles," which she later said she carried through out of fear. In late 1993, during a "tense five-month hiatus" from Hall, she worked at the Virginia Housing Development Authority. Still afraid to break up with Hall, she later joined him on the run from authorities beginning in December 1993. The two lived in Seattle for four months, with Smith now pregnant. She returned to her parents' home in August 1994, and turned herself in to the authorities on September 1. Hall was shot and killed in his apartment on October 1.

Smith was charged with "conspiracy to crack and powder cocaine trafficking, money laundering and making false statements to federal agents." She pled guilty to all three charges, although she had never sold the drug. Although her attorney hoped Smith would receive a sentence reduction, she was ultimately sentenced in April 1994 to 24½ years in prison for a "first-time nonviolent crack cocaine offense" under mandatory sentencing laws.

Smith's story gained attention from organizations such as the NAACP after she was featured in the May 1996 issue of Emerge Magazine.

Smith's parents spoke out against the war on drugs and continued to advocate for their daughter for the length of her prison sentence. She served 6½ years at Federal Correctional Institution, Danbury before President Clinton's order of clemency in December 2000.

Smith saw her right to vote restored in 2012, and received a pardon from President Joe Biden on January 19, 2025.

== Activism ==
Smith is a speaker on the rights of felons and works in the state of Virginia to reinstate their power to vote, serve on a jury and run for public office. She worked for the ACLU in Virginia as their State Advocacy Campaigns Director.

Smith has received numerous awards while fighting for the rights of released prisoners and educating the public on topics related to drug policies. Smith also educates the public on current laws and the criminal system. She is involved in a tour sponsored by Procter & Gamble's Tampax "Totally You Tour".

In 2019, Smith Pradia was appointed to the Virginia Parole Board.

== Personal life ==
Smith gave birth to her son in December 1994, four months before her sentencing. He lived with her parents during her time in prison. In August 2006, Smith met Patrick Pradia, whom she later married; the couple had one daughter.

In 2010, Smith Pradia and her husband moved to Indianapolis.

== Film ==
In 2024, a film adaptation of Smith Pradia's life was released on BET+, titled Kemba. Smith Pradia was an executive producer for the film.

== Kemba Smith Foundation ==
Smith Pradia founded the Kemba Smith Foundation, a charitable organization which aims to raise awareness of certain social issues, including drug abuse, violence, AIDS, teenage pregnancy, and abuse. Some of the objectives of the Kemba Smith Foundation include:

- to work toward the elimination of prejudice and discrimination in neighborhoods, and combat juvenile delinquency.
- to implement real-life stories into forums that are examples to young people about the detrimental effects of bad decisions and inappropriate conduct.
