= 2025–2026 United States redistricting =

- States that have undergone mid-decade redistricting prior to the 2026 elections: Finalized new map; intended to result in Democratic gain Finalized new map; intended to result in Republican gain New map finalized; later struck down in court Redistricting challenge rejected by courts Voluntary redistricting rejected
- Date: July 9, 2025 – September 25, 2026 (1 year, 2 months, 2 weeks and 2 days)
- Location: Redistricting plan in effect for 2026 elections: Alabama, California, Florida, Louisiana, North Carolina, Ohio, Tennessee, Texas, and Utah; Redistricting unsuccessfully attempted: Arkansas, Indiana, Kansas, Maryland, Missouri, New York, South Carolina, Virginia, and Wisconsin
- Cause: Partisan benefit in the 2026 United States House of Representatives elections, as well as state constitutional or court-mandated redistricting
- Outcome: By 2024 results: Net 12 Republican and 1 Democratic seats established; net 13 competitive seats dissolved. (Note: Competitive seats are defined as seats won by less than 10 points by their respective party in 2024); Republicans lose majority in the 2026 elections, with the intended benefit largely failing to materialize due to dummymandering.; Continuation into 2027–2028.

A map displaying which states have undergone mid-decade redistricting between the 2024 and 2026 elections, colored by the reasoning behind the redistricting: Voluntary redistricting Court-ordered/mandatory redistricting New map finalized; later struck down in court Redistricting challenge rejected by courts Voluntary redistricting rejected

Beginning in July 2025, several U.S. states redrew or attempted to redraw their congressional districts ahead of the 2026 United States House of Representatives elections, with multiple other states planning to draw new maps before the 2028 elections. These efforts mark the largest coordinated attempt to redraw congressional districts between decennial censuses in modern American history.

The redistricting began when Texas gerrymandered its congressional map to benefit Republicans—who held a narrow House majority—upon President Donald Trump's request. Republican-controlled legislatures in Missouri and North Carolina soon followed by enacting new congressional maps with the aim of gaining more Republican seats. In response, Democratic-led states began the process of gerrymandering their own congressional maps to counter Republican gains. California was the first, with voters enacting a constitutional amendment to redraw the state's congressional map to benefit Democrats. Virginia voters followed and passed an amendment to redraw their districts as well; however, it was subsequently invalidated by the Virginia Supreme Court. Furthermore, Ohio was required to redraw its districts since the previous map did not receive bipartisan support in the General Assembly as required by the Ohio Constitution. Likewise, Utah was required to redistrict due to the Utah Supreme Court striking down its previous map as an unlawful partisan gerrymander.

Following the U.S. Supreme Court's 2026 decision in Louisiana v. Callais, which limited challenges to gerrymandered maps using the Voting Rights Act of 1965, several more Southern states began to consider redistricting. The Florida Legislature convened in a special session for redistricting in anticipation of the ruling, and it passed a new map immediately after the Court's decision was released. The states of Tennessee, Louisiana, and Alabama subsequently enacted new maps.

Ultimately, Democrats won a decisive majority in the 2026 elections. Republicans lost previously safe districts due to massive shifts across the country, while Democrats retained nearly all districts that were redrawn to disfavor them. Political analysts and commentators have considered this an example of a dummymander.

== Background ==
In the 2024 elections, the Republican Party achieved a trifecta by winning a 220–215 majority in the United States House of Representatives in addition to winning control of the United States Senate and the presidency. Since the beginning of Donald Trump's second presidency, Trump had wanted to protect the narrow Republican House majority in the 2026 midterm elections and prevent Democratic gains in the House, which he believed would hamper his administration's ability to carry out its plans. He sought to accomplish this by encouraging states with Republican-controlled legislatures to redraw their congressional maps to pick up more Republican seats, offsetting potential Democratic gains in other states. Planning among Trump's advisors began prior to his inauguration, spearheaded by James Blair in contact with Adam Kincaid, the executive director of the National Republican Redistricting Trust. Blair presented the idea to Trump in April, and he quickly agreed to it.

The National Democratic Redistricting Committee had also begun preparing for the possibility of Republicans redrawing maps mid-decade after Trump's victory in November 2024, harkening back to the aggressive gerrymandering Republicans performed under REDMAP after the 2010 elections. In June, The New York Times reported that the Trump administration had called on the Republican leadership in the state of Texas to redraw the state's congressional boundaries in order to create more Republican leaning districts. The plan elicited concern from some Texas Republicans, who argued that it could hurt incumbent Republicans. As the plan began to take action, reporters asked Trump how many Republican-led states would be redistricted; Trump replied with "four of them".

Redistricting mid-cycle, meaning not in response to a census, is extremely rare, and is usually done because courts have thrown out the previous maps for legal reasons. From 1970 until 2026, only two states redrew their congressional districts between censuses for partisan advantage.

== Louisiana v. Callais ==
In the 2026 Supreme Court case Louisiana v. Callais, the Court held that Section 2 of the Voting Rights Act (VRA) does not require states to draw majority-minority districts, despite previous decisions of the Court interpreting the Act as to require such districts be drawn in certain instances. Many viewed the ruling as providing an opportunity for southern states to eliminate these districts, which could result in Republican gains due to the fact that minority voters typically support Democratic candidates, while white voters in these states usually support Republican candidates. The timing of the decision was not expected to have a significant impact for the 2026 general election, as it was issued after multiple states had already begun the primary process, though expected to impact the 2028 election as states would have time to pass new maps. Despite this, Louisiana and three other states (Florida, Tennessee, and Alabama) succeeded in enacting redistricting plans shortly after the decision's release on April 29.

Louisiana governor Jeff Landry and attorney general Liz Murrill announced the day after the decision that they were suspending the state's primary set for May 16 to give time for the legislature to draw a new map that would be compliant with the ruling, despite that mail-in ballots had already been sent to overseas and early voting residents.

== Finalized redistricting plans ==
=== Overview of passed redistricting ===
Date enacted	State	Intended partisan advantage^{a}	Actual partisan advantage^{d}	Ballot measure?	Ballot measure results	Blocked by court?	Enacted by court?
August 29, 2025	Texas	R +5 seats	R +1 seat	No	—N/a	No	No
September 28, 2025	Missouri	~~R +1 seat~~	—N/a	Yes	Yes 37.56 - No 62.44	Yes	No
October 22, 2025	North Carolina	R +1 seat	D +1 seat	No	—N/a	No	No
October 31, 2025	Ohio	R +2 seats	± 0 seats	No	—N/a	No	No
November 4, 2025	California	D +5 seats	± 0 seats	Yes	Yes 64.42 - No 35.58	No	No
November 10, 2025	Utah	D +1 seat	R +2 seats	No	—N/a	No	Yes
April 21, 2026	Virginia	~~D +4 seats~~	—N/a	Yes	~~Yes 51.61 - No 48.39~~	Yes	No
May 4, 2026	Florida	R +4 seats	R +1 seat	No	—N/a	No	No
May 7, 2026	Tennessee	R +1 seat	R +1 seat	No	—N/a	No	No
May 29, 2026	Louisiana	R +1 seat	R +1 seat	No	—N/a	No	No (Note: While the Supreme Court struck down Louisiana's old congressional map, the Supreme Court had Louisiana's legislature create the new map.)
June 2, 2026	Alabama	R +1 seat	± 0 seats	No	—N/a	No	No
Net		R +9 seats	R +5 seats	N/A			

^{a} Red indicates Republican; blue indicates Democratic.

^{b} The Missouri Supreme Court blocked the new map from being used in the 2026 elections, but a ballot measure will be voted on in November 2026 to determine whether the new map will be used in the 2028 elections.

^{c} After Louisiana's previous map was declared unconstitutional by the U.S. Supreme Court in its Callais decision, the Louisiana State Legislature convened to enact a replacement map.

^{d} This column represents the number of seats with different partisan winners in the 2026 elections than if the same election were held under the previously passed maps.

=== Texas ===
Texas's congressional district boundaries before (left) and after (right) redistricting

On July 9, 2025, Governor Greg Abbott called for a special session of the Texas Legislature to discuss redistricting. The action was expressed as being a response to a letter from the United States Department of Justice citing a need to remedy supposedly racially discriminatory districts in the current congressional map. The action received backlash from Democratic leaders including Ken Martin and began talks to discuss a response to the proposed redistricting, including the possibility of Democratic state representatives walking out of the session to delay the process.

The first special session began on July 21. A new map was redrawn in the session as state Democrats vowed to prolong the redistricting effort and walked out of session preventing quorum from being reached in the state house. On August 18, the special session had expired, and state Democrats returned to the state after viewing the prevention of a new map in the first session and the national coverage of the incidents a "victory". A second special session was called on August 18 by Abbott. A proposed congressional map containing five new Republican-leaning districts passed both the state house and senate and was signed on August 29, 2025.

On November 18, 2025, a federal court in El Paso, Texas, ruled that the maps consisted an illegal racial gerrymander, and as a result, barred their use in the 2026 midterm elections. On November 21, the U.S. Supreme Court approved a request filed by Texas to temporarily block the lower court ruling. On December 4, the Supreme Court stayed the District Court ruling in a 6–3 decision that allowed Texas to use the map in 2026, concluding that the District Court had "failed to honor the presumption of legislative good faith by construing ambiguous direct and circumstantial evidence against the legislature" in finding that the map was racially gerrymandered, and had "improperly inserted itself into an active primary campaign" because it issued its ruling after the candidate filing period had begun. The dissenting opinion, written by Elena Kagan and joined by Sonia Sotomayor and Ketanji Brown Jackson, argued that the majority was not following the appropriate standard of review for questions of fact, stating, "We are a higher court than the District Court, but we are not a better one when it comes to making such a fact-based decision."

Despite this redistricting, Democrats in Texas ended up netting one House seat.

=== California ===
California's congressional district boundaries before (left) and after (right) redistricting

Multiple Democratic leaders, including Hakeem Jeffries, began to push California Governor Gavin Newsom to respond to redistricting in Texas by redrawing California's congressional districts; however, the state's use of an independent redistricting commission was the primary obstacle to achieving the goal. To bypass the commission, the state house and state senate passed an amendment putting a referendum on the November ballot to redraw the state's districts. The new congressional map made 5 Republican districts and several competitive districts much more Democratic to offset the gains made by the Texas map.

The measure, titled Proposition 50, was approved by voters in the November 2025 election, enacting the proposed redistricting plan. Following the vote, the California Republican Party filed a federal lawsuit against Governor Gavin Newsom and Secretary of State Shirley Weber, alleging that the new maps violate the Voting Rights Act by favoring Latino voters and asked a federal court to issue a temporary restraining order and preliminary injunction to prevent Proposition 50's maps from going into effect. The U.S. Justice Department joined the California Republican Party's lawsuit. In January 2026, a three-judge panel of the United States District Court for the Central District of California upheld the use of the map by the state, rejecting the California Republican Party's claims that the map was racially gerrymandered.

On February 4, the U.S. Supreme Court denied an application for an appeal of the Central California U.S. District Court panel ruling by the California Republican Party. The order was issued without comment or dissent, with legal commentators noting the Court's reasoning in its ruling the previous December on the Texas map after concluding that it was a partisan rather than racial gerrymander and allowed the map in Texas to stand.

=== Missouri ===
Missouri's congressional district boundaries before (left) and after (right) redistricting, the latter of which was blocked by the Missouri Supreme Court pending a ballot measure

On August 29, 2025, Governor Mike Kehoe announced a special session to redraw the state's congressional districts and place Kansas City Democrat Emanuel Cleaver in a much more Republican-leaning district. The Missouri House of Representatives voted to advance the new map that would give Republicans another seat, which was approved in the Missouri Senate, where it also advanced. The new map was signed into law by Kehoe on September 28.

The new map faced lawsuits and a citizens' initiative ballot measure that suspended the map's implementation for the 2026 elections. In March 2026, opponents of the map said they had gathered enough signatures for the ballot measure to qualify. On March 24, 2026, the Supreme Court of Missouri ruled in a 4-3 decision, that the new congressional maps did not violate the state's Constitution. Republican Secretary of State Denny Hoskins had to decide whether the map will reach a statewide ballot, following the validation of the petition signatories needed to force a referendum, and a state court's ruling on March 20, 2026, that Hoskins must remove argumentative language from the ballot summary for the possible referendum.

Hoskins blocked the referendum on August 4, a few hours before the polls closed for the primary elections in Missouri, declaring it unconstitutional, and prompting a lawsuit from the group which had collected more than 300,000 signatures for it to qualify on the ballot. The reasoning behind Hoskin's actions was that if the General Assembly had approved the redistricting, the state's Constitution prevents the plans from being subject to referendum.

On September 3, the Missouri Supreme Court unanimously overturned Hoskins' decision, stating that the petition was "legal, sufficient, and timely". On September 8, U.S. Supreme Court Justice Brett Kavanaugh rejected Denny Hoskins's emergency appeal, keeping the previous maps in place for the 2026 election. However, the same day, Chief U.S. District Judge Stephen Clark of the Eastern District of Missouri issued a temporary restraining order in a separate lawsuit prohibiting the state from using anything but the new 2025 maps. The Supreme Court blocked the temporary restraining order on September 10, keeping the 2022 map intact.

The issue was complicated further when on September 21, the 8th Circuit Court of Appeals ordered Missouri to use the 2025 maps, despite the Supreme Court's ruling. The reasoning behind this order was that the new map was used when conducting the primary election, and that to revert to the older map would cause more confusion for voters. On September 25, the U.S. Supreme Court unanimously held that state law rules in the case and granted an emergency stay of the Eighth Circuit's order and Judge Clark's injunction, leaving the 2022 maps in place for the 2026 elections. The court also faulted the District Court and the Eighth Circuit for what it deemed as having "incorrectly applied" the Purcell Principle and further held that the Supreme Court of Missouri was not at fault for "upsetting the status quo".

On November 3rd, 2026, voters in Missouri rejected the new map, with over 61% of voters voting "No" on Proposition A.

=== North Carolina ===
North Carolina's congressional district boundaries before (left) and after (right) redistricting

In October 2025, Speaker of the North Carolina House of Representatives Destin Hall and President pro tempe of the North Carolina Senate Phil Berger introduced a plan to redraw North Carolina's congressional map to make Don Davis's seat more favorable to Republicans in the hopes of increasing the party's chances of picking up the seat. The measure passed both chambers and became law, as it did not require Democratic governor Josh Stein's signature. On November 26, a panel of three federal judges issued a ruling allowing the use of the map.

This move ultimately proved unsuccessful as Davis ended up winning re-election in the new gerrymandered seat and the Republican incumbent in the other redrawn district was defeated by Democratic challenger Raymond Smith. In addition, at least six other Democratic candidates ended up winning unchanged Republican-leaning districts, and one uncalled race remains within a point. Democrats now hold a majority in the state's House delegation for the first time since 2013.

=== Utah ===
Utah's congressional district boundaries before (left) and after (right) redistricting

In July 2023, in League of Women Voters v. Utah State Legislature, the Utah Supreme Court heard arguments alleging that the Utah Legislature violated 2018 Utah Proposition 4, a citizen-passed anti-gerrymandering proposition, by dividing Salt Lake County voters into all four of Utah's districts. The case was sent back to a state district court, which held a hearing on January 31, 2025. A ruling for the League of Women Voters was issued on August 25.

On October 6, the Utah Legislature passed a new map, which changed two Republican districts to be more competitive. On November 10, Utah Third District Judge Dianna Gibson ruled that the new map also violated Proposition 4, opting to approve a plaintiff-submitted alternative, Map 1, which creates a safe Democratic district comprising a majority of Salt Lake County. Republicans lost appeals at both the Utah Supreme Court and federal court, meaning the newest map would be the one used in the 2026 midterm elections.

In response, over 200,000 Utah Republicans signed a petition to put a ballot measure repealing Proposition 4 on the November 2026 ballot. On March 26, 2026, following a coordinated signature removal campaign, the ballot measure fell below the requisite signature threshold and failed to make it onto the ballot.

=== Ohio ===
Ohio's congressional district boundaries before (left) and after (right) redistricting

In 2022 during redistricting after the 2020 United States Census, Republicans in the state drafted a new map that was favorable for Republicans. It was struck down in July of that year, as the Supreme Court of Ohio found it in violation of a voter-approved anti-gerrymandering referendum in the state. Afterwards, Republicans altered the map but kept it in favor of Republicans, and the Court found it in violation for a second time, but ruled that nothing could be done since primary voting for the 2022 United States House of Representatives elections in Ohio had already begun. Under Ohio law, since the map did not receive bipartisan support, the court instead ordered for the new congressional map to expire early.

In October 2025, the Ohio Redistricting Commission took over control of drafting a new map to be used in the 2026 United States House of Representatives elections, and finalized the draft later that month. The new map aimed to change the 10-5 Republican majority to a 12-3 Republican majority by making Greg Landsman's district (OH-1) and Marcy Kaptur's district (OH-9) more competitive. Since the vote was decided unanimously by the Commission, it did not violate the previously voter-approved redistricting amendment that aimed to combat gerrymandering, and also blocked any future challenges on the map. The maps are now locked in place until 2032.

Despite these changes, Kaptur and Landsman ended up winning re-election, both by over five points. In addition, Republicans Mike Carey, Max Miller, and Mike Turner ended up losing re-election, giving Democrats a 8-7 majority in the state's House delegation, the first such occurrence since 2013.

=== Virginia ===
Virginia's congressional district boundaries before (left) and after (right) redistricting; the latter was blocked by the Virginia Supreme Court, leaving the previous map in place.

In late October 2025, Democratic leaders in Virginia announced a process to redraw their state's congressional maps before the 2026 midterms in retaliation for the new map passed in North Carolina. Virginia, similarly to California, has a bipartisan commission to draw both state and federal legislative districts. Democratic lawmakers proposed a constitutional amendment to allow the General Assembly to modify the state's congressional map if any other state did so prior to the normal 2030 redistricting cycle, at which point redistricting power would revert to the commission. In Virginia, constitutional amendments have to be approved by the legislature in two consecutive legislative sessions, with a general election in between them, prior to being sent to the public for approval in a referendum. On October 29, 2025, the Virginia House of Delegates passed the amendment on a party-line vote. The state Senate followed suit on October 31.

Democrats greatly expanded their majority in the House of Delegates in the 2025 election, assuring the amendment's second passage. On January 16, 2026, the Senate passed the constitutional amendment a second time, following the House of Delegates which had done so earlier in the week. A proposed map, which was expected to net Democrats three or four seats, was released in early February and the special election was scheduled for April 21.

On January 27, a Virginia Circuit Court judge for Tazewell County ruled that the amendment was unlawful because early voting was already underway in the 2025 election when it was first passed, thus violating the intervening-election requirement. Virginia Democratic leaders condemned the decision and appealed the ruling; the court of appeals forwarded it to the Supreme Court of Virginia for an expedited ruling citing the importance of the case. On February 13, the Supreme Court allowed the referendum on the amendment, set for April 21, to proceed as they considered the case. On February 19, the judge from Tazewell County issued an injunction and restraining order against the special election following the state Republican party filing a suit against the new maps. On March 2, in response to a lawsuit from the City of Lynchburg, the Lynchburg Circuit Court allowed the election to go forward and determined that all constitutional questions would be decided afterward. On April 21, voters approved the referendum allowing the new maps to come into effect until 2030. On April 27, the Virginia Supreme Court began hearing arguments over the constitutionality of the referendum. The court issued its ruling on May 8. In a 4–3 decision, it agreed with the original circuit court ruling that the amendment was void because the intervening-election requirement was not satisfied.

Following the ruling, House Speaker Don Scott and Attorney General Jay Jones filed an emergency appeal to the United States Supreme Court. The U.S. Supreme Court denied the application for a stay on May 15.

=== Florida ===
Florida's congressional district boundaries before (left) and after (right) redistricting

In August 2025, Governor Ron DeSantis expressed support for redrawing the state's congressional maps. Following this, Ben Albritton, president of the Florida Senate, announced a redistricting commission to begin the process. In December 2025, a congressional redistricting select committee of the Florida House of Representatives held its first meeting.

On January 7, 2026, DeSantis officially issued a proclamation calling for a special legislative session regarding congressional redistricting. The session was scheduled to convene from April 20-24, 2026, following the conclusion of the regular legislative session. In the proclamation, DeSantis cited the need to comply with the upcoming U.S. Supreme Court's Callais decision and stated that the legislature would appropriate additional funds to defend the new maps against legal challenges. It is expected that the redistricting could add four additional Republican seats. Governor DeSantis signed the bill into law on May 4 after the Florida Legislature passed the redistricting bill a week earlier.

Despite redistricting, Florida Republicans are not expected to gain any seats; notably, Kathy Castor overperformed Trump by 14 points in her re-election campaign.

=== Tennessee ===
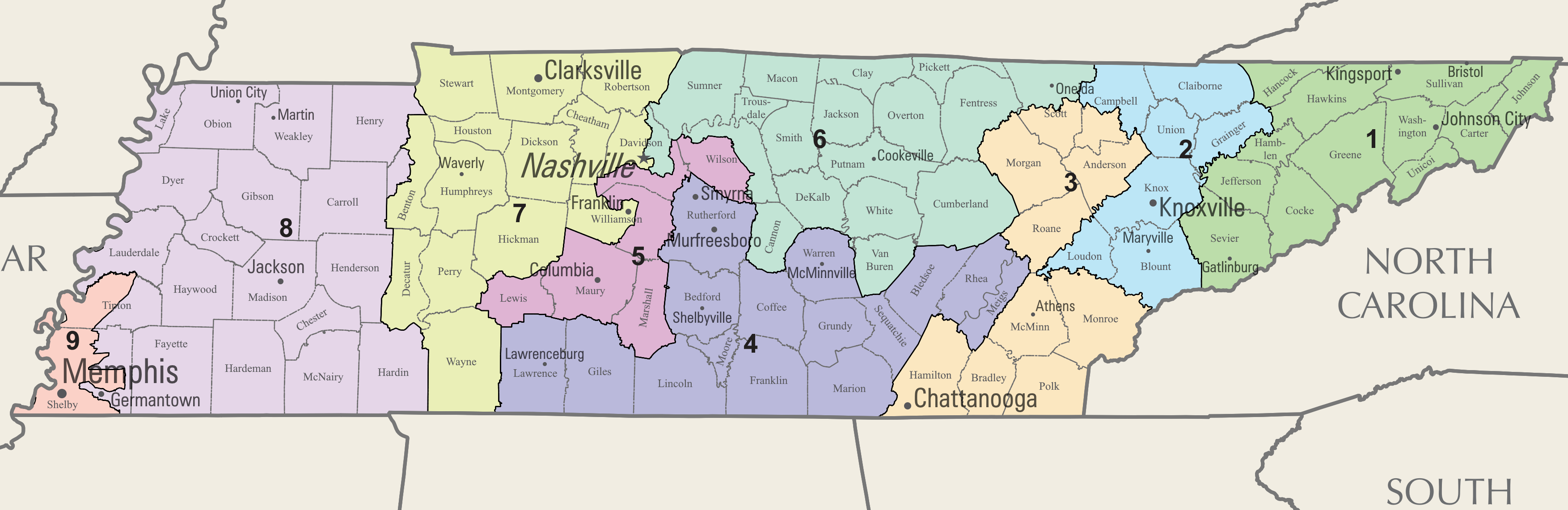
Tennessee's congressional district boundaries before (top) and after (bottom) redistricting

Following the Supreme Court's decision in Louisiana v. Callais, Bill Lee, the Republican Governor of Tennessee, called an extraordinary session of the Tennessee Legislature for the purpose of redrawing its congressional districts, targeting Steve Cohen's Memphis-based 9th district, the state's lone Democratic congressional seat.

The new map was passed by the House and Senate on May 7, 2026. Governor Lee signed it into law the same day. Rep. Cohen later announced that due to the redistricting, he would not be seeking re-election, if courts were to uphold the new map.

On May 26, U.S. Chief District Judge William L. Campbell Jr. declined the request from the ACLU, representing Black Memphis voters, to temporarily block the new map until it could be weighed by a three-judge panel. The plaintiffs are expected to appeal the decision.

The redistricting was unsuccessful, however; though Republican Brent Taylor won the newly-drawn 9th district, defeating Democrat Justin J. Pearson by a closer-than-expected margin of less than 3,000 votes, Victoria Broderick pulled off an upset in the new 4th district, defeating scandal-plagued incumbent Scott DesJarlais by 280 votes, netting Republicans zero seats.

=== Louisiana ===
Louisiana's congressional district boundaries before (left) and after (right) redistricting

After the U.S. Supreme Court struck down Louisiana's congressional maps for being "an unconstitutional racial gerrymander" in Louisiana v. Callais, Secretary of State Nancy Landry delayed primaries for the U.S. House to allow for a redistricting session. On May 29, the Republican-controlled state legislature passed a new map that altered the 6th district in a manner that reduced the number of Black voters and is expected to shift the district to Republican control. The new primary date for the U.S. House seats is November 3, the same day as the general election in the U.S. Senate race and the new general election date is December 12. The new map has also faced legal challenges.

=== Alabama ===
District lines selected by the District Court for the Northern District of Alabama on October 2023 after Allen v. Milligan for the 2024 elections
(Interactive map version)

District lines passed by the Alabama Legislature on May 2026 after Louisiana v. Callais for the 2026 elections
(Interactive map version)

Since the 2023 Supreme Court decision in Allen v. Milligan, there had been an injunction against the maps drawn by the legislature and court drawn maps were used. In the aftermath of the Callais decision, Alabama's Republican Governor Kay Ivey called a special legislative session to start on May 4, 2026 to redraw the legislative districts for congressional and state senate seats. During the session, a bill was passed to allow for the state to redraw the map if a previous ruling that had blocked the state from redrawing mid-decade following a previous lawsuit was lifted. On June 2, 2026, the Supreme Court, with an unsigned 6-3 order, granted an emergency request to remove the Milligan injunction and allow the use of the legislatively drawn maps, which removed a majority-Black district that had been added by the court drawn maps.

Despite this change, Shomari Figures, the incumbent Democrat for the 2nd district, won the newly-gerrymandered district by nearly eight points, making a 22-point swing from the 2024 presidential election.

== Failed proposals and litigation ==
=== Indiana ===
In October 2025, Indiana Governor Mike Braun called for a special legislative session to begin November 3 to redraw the state's congressional maps. This came after weeks of communication with the Trump administration, including visits by Vice President JD Vance, over the possibility of strengthening the partisan advantage in the state. This push was met with resistance from legislative Republicans, particularly in the Indiana Senate.

On November 14, Indiana Senate leader Rodric Bray announced there were not enough Republican votes to move forward with the redistricting process. On November 18, the Senate voted to adjourn until the next regular session in January 2026. On December 5, the Indiana House passed a map that would turn the state's 1st and 7th congressional districts, both held by Democrats, into solidly Republican ones.

On December 8, the Senate convened after reversing its earlier decision to adjourn, and the new maps passed out of committee. On December 11, the proposal was rejected in the State Senate after opposition from 21 Republicans and all 10 Democrats, ending the redistricting effort in Indiana. President Trump threatened to support the primary opponents of any Republican who did not support the redistricting effort. Numerous people have been swatted.

In the 2026 primary election, 5 out of the 7 Republicans who voted against redistricting lost renomination.

=== New York ===
Governor Kathy Hochul had previously pledged to involve New York in the national redistricting conflict to counter Republican gains elsewhere. In January 2026, a judge struck down the boundaries of New York City's sole Republican-held district, ruling that the lines diluted the votes of minorities. The ruling provided an opportunity for the state legislature to redraw the state's congressional map, a move that could potentially have netted the Democratic Party four to five additional seats. Republican Representative Nicole Malliotakis, whose district was struck down, along with The New York State Republican Elections Commissioner filed an emergency appeal to the U.S. Supreme Court in February in an attempt to prevent the redrawing of her district before the 2026 midterm elections. On March 2, the Supreme Court blocked the state judge from redrawing the district lines, allowing Malliotakis' original lines to stand for the 2026 elections. The court appeared to be divided ideologically, with liberal justices Sotomayor, Jackson and Kagan publicly dissenting, while conservative Justice Alito openly agreed to the congresswoman's emergency appeal.

=== Illinois ===
Democratic House minority leader Hakeem Jeffries had urged the state of Illinois to pursue a new congressional map to counter Republican redistricting gains. In Illinois, state legislative leaders have been skeptical of redrawing their congressional lines, arguing it is not possible, although Jeffries has continued to lobby for action. Governor JB Pritzker emphasized that any decision on whether Illinois should redraw its congressional map would depend on Indiana's actions, noting that the state was "watching what Indiana does" before considering any response.

=== Maryland ===
In Maryland, Governor Wes Moore and now former House Speaker Adrienne A. Jones have expressed openness to examining potential changes, particularly regarding the state's sole Republican-held seat, including the possibility of calling a special legislative session on the issue. State Senate President Bill Ferguson reiterated his opposition in an October 2025 letter to colleagues, arguing that mid-decade redistricting could undermine the state's legal standing and public trust.

On November 4, 2025, Moore formed the Governor's Redistricting Advisory Commission, tasked with holding public hearings and providing recommendations for a new congressional map. The creation of the commission signaled an effort by state Democrats to consider redrawing Maryland's congressional boundaries ahead of the 2026 elections, potentially to offset Republican gains in other states. The five-member commission, chaired by U.S. Senator Angela Alsobrooks, also included two gubernatorial appointees and two legislative leaders or their designees. On December 18, 2025, the commission voted to recommend that the state move forward with considering new congressional boundary maps, and on January 20, 2026, the commission voted to recommend a congressional map that would redraw the 1st congressional district to make it more favorable for Democrats. The map passed the Maryland House of Delegates by a 99–37 vote on February 2, 2026, after which Senate President Bill Ferguson said he would not hold a vote for the redistricting bill in the Senate. Ferguson expressed concerns that such a gerrymander would lead to the Maryland Supreme Court striking down the map, which U.S. representative Andy Harris predicted could lead to Republican gains in the state.

In March 2026, during debate on a bill that would require special elections to fill vacancies in the Maryland General Assembly, state delegate Kris Fair added an amendment to the bill that would create a constitutional referendum that would change the Constitution to clarify that its map-drawing guidelines only apply to state legislative districts and not congressional districts, potentially opening the door to Maryland lawmakers making another effort to redraw the state's congressional districts in the future. However, Ferguson said that he was opposed to this proposal, saying that the way the proposal was amended onto the special elections bill would violate the Maryland Constitution's single subject rule, which requires that General Assembly bills only tackle one topic at a time, and that the Senate would not deal with redistricting-related issues again until 2032, when states are required to redraw their congressional districts.

The state legislative session ended in April 2026 with the state Senate leaving the bill in committee. In May 2026, Ferguson told reports that he supported convening a special session to amend the Maryland Constitution to alter redistricting-related language cited in the 2022 court decision that struck down the state's congressional redistricting plan, citing the scramble among Republican-led legislatures across the Southern United States to dismantle majority-Black districts following the Callais decision.

On July 8, Ferguson and Maryland House of Delegates Speaker Joseline Peña-Melnyk announced a special session of the General Assembly to consider redistricting legislation. The session was scheduled for August 3-5.

=== South Carolina ===
In South Carolina, members of the state legislature have advocated to redraw the state's congressional districts to disfavor Jim Clyburn, the state's sole Democratic representative. Davey Hiott, the Majority Leader of the South Carolina House of Representatives, has said the state will not redistrict.

In May 2026, the South Carolina House of Representatives passed a resolution that would extend the legislative calendar of the state to allow for redistricting. However, the resolution fell short of the two-thirds majority approval needed to proceed in the state senate, with five Republican senators joining all Democrats in voting against it.

Prior to the vote, Shane Massey, the Senate Majority Leader, stated he would oppose any redistricting effort. He criticised "national Republicans for failing to deliver much with the majority they currently have," and warned that "if Republicans were to draw out Democrats entirely from the state's congressional delegation, South Carolina risks losing influence the next time a Democrat occupies the White House." He acknowledged he would likely face consequences for his position, and still voted with the majority against the measure. Despite previously declining to call a special session on redistricting, Republican Governor Henry McMaster issued an executive order to re-convene the General Assembly in order to discuss redistricting after pressure from President Trump.

On May 26, the Senate voted to adjourn until June 10, after all Democrats were joined by 12 Republicans to defeat a vote aimed at ending debate on redistricting early. Republican state senators blamed Governor McMaster's request to consider redistricting as coming too late, due to the fact that voting for the primaries had already begun. Republican senator Richard Cash stated that he could "no longer support the passage of this bill for one simple reason: South Carolina citizens are going to the polls today," and said “neither my conscience nor common sense will allow me to stop an election that has already begun."

=== Wisconsin ===
Redistricting challenges in Wisconsin were attempted three times between 2025 and 2026, with the first attempt in 2025 being the Wisconsin Supreme Court case of Felton v. Wisconsin Election Commission (WEC). It was argued that the 6-2 Republican majority map in Wisconsin was an unconstitutional partisan gerrymander, which should be replaced with a fairer 5-3 or 4-4 split to better reflect the near even partisan split in the state. However, the Wisconsin Supreme court declined to hear arguments for the case.

In 2026, Democrats tried again to challenge the 6-2 Republican majority map twice, arguing that it was an illegal partisan gerrymander. The court cases Bothfeld v. WEC and WBLD v. WEC were both thrown out in state courts, since a lower court could not overrule the Wisconsin Supreme Court, which had previously authorized the current map to be used back in 2022, as well as declining to hear arguments in the first redistricting challenge. The rejection of the court case WBLD v. WEC marked an end to redistricting attempts in Wisconsin.

=== Arkansas ===
In January 2025, Democrats introduced a constitutional amendment (HJR 1001) to establish an independent redistricting commission. However, this amendment died in committee. Earlier in 2023, Democrats filed a lawsuit against Arkansas's 4-0 Republican congressional map in the federal court case Christian Ministerial Alliance v. Thurston, arguing that it was an illegal racial gerrymander as it split Pulaski County (Including Little Rock, the state's capital) into three separate districts, therefore diluting black voting power. Arguments were scheduled to take place in March of 2025, and in June 2025 a panel of three judges ruled that there was a lack of evidence to prove that Arkansas's congressional districts were racially gerrymandered.

=== Kansas ===
In Kansas, Republican leaders in the state legislature approved the budget for a special session on redistricting. The process was stalled as Republican lawmakers did not have enough votes to begin the process. Legislative leadership has stated that a new map will be passed during regular session in January 2026. However, as of January 6, the Republicans were about "20 votes short" in the Kansas House of Representatives due to Laura Kelly's veto power.

=== Washington ===
In Washington, House Majority Leader Joe Fitzgibbon and Representative Sharlett Mena introduced a joint resolution that would amend the constitution of Washington. The amendment would permit the Washington State Legislature to redraw the state's congressional lines if another state redrew their map mid-decade outside of a judicial order. The Olympian reported that the Washington Democratic Party does not have the prerequisite two-thirds majority in both chambers and would require votes from Republicans to pass the resolution, making it unlikely to pass before the 2026 elections. Shasti Conrad, the chairwoman of the Washington State Democratic Party, opened the possibility of redistricting after 2026, should the Democratic Party win supermajorities in both chambers of the state legislature.

=== New Jersey ===
Shortly after the ruling on redistricting in Louisiana, Governor Mikie Sherrill, in an interview, said that she is open to redrawing the congressional maps in New Jersey to favor the Democrats. However, the state legislature said that redistricting is not a priority, and any redistricting would happen after the 2026 midterm elections. If redistricting does however go through, New Jersey could eliminate 2-3 Republican held seats.

=== New Hampshire ===
There was pressure on New Hampshire to redistrict to give Republicans an extra seat. However, Governor Kelly Ayotte said she would not pursue redistricting.

== Results ==
In the 2026 midterm elections, expected Republican gains from redistricting largely failed to materialize. Due to the widespread unpopularity of Donald Trump's second term, many districts that voted for Trump by 10–20 percentage points ended up backing the Democratic candidates in the new districts. Media outlets and political scientists have considered this as an example of dummymandering. On the other hand, the Democratic favored map in California met expectations. In contrast, the involuntarily redistricted Utah map produced a roughly proportional result.

A November 2026 analysis by The New York Times showed Republicans gained between four and seven seats more than they would have without the new maps.

State	Anticipated net change	Seats yet to be called	Result	Difference
Alabama	R+1	—N/a	±0	D+1
California	D+5	—N/a	D+5	±0
Florida	R+4	—N/a	±0	D+4
Louisiana	R+1	2 seats	TBD (Note: Two districts in Louisiana are headed to a runoff election, which will be held on December 12, 2026.)	TBD
North Carolina	R+1	—N/a	D+7	D+8
Ohio	R+2	—N/a	D+3	D+5
Tennessee	R+1	—N/a	±0	D+1
Texas	R+5	—N/a	D+1	D+6
Utah	D+1	—N/a	D+1	±0
Net (Note: AP News 2026 United States House of Representatives election results as of 20 November 2026, 21:37:00 UTC.)	R+9 seats	2 seats	D+17 seats	D+25 Seats

== See also ==
- 2020 United States redistricting cycle
- Democratic backsliding in the United States
- Gerrymandering in the United States
- Political polarization in the United States
