= 2027–2028 United States redistricting =

- States that have undergone mid-decade redistricting prior to the 2028 elections. Anticipated new map; Democratic gain expected Redistricting challenge rejected by courts Voluntary redistricting rejected Redistricting referendum rejected
- Date: May 13, 2026 – present; (6 months, 1 week and 2 days)
- Location: Planned or not yet in effect: Maryland and New York; Redistricting unsuccessfully attempted: Colorado, Georgia, and Missouri
- Cause: Partisan benefit in the 2028 United States House of Representatives elections, as well as state constitutional or court-mandated redistricting

A map displaying which states have undergone mid-decade redistricting between the 2026 and 2028 elections, colored by the reasoning behind the redistricting. Stripes indicate anticipated redistricting that has not been finalized or fully approved. Voluntary redistricting Redistricting challenge rejected by courts Voluntary redistricting rejected Redistricting referendum rejected

Beginning in May 2026, several U.S. states have considered redrawing their congressional districts ahead of the 2028 United States House of Representatives elections, as a follow up to the mid-decade redistricting that took place leading up to the 2026 elections.

Discussions of redistricting ahead of 2028 began when the U.S. Supreme Court's decision in Louisiana v. Callais was released on April 29, 2026, which limited challenges to gerrymandered maps using the Voting Rights Act of 1965, triggering Georgia Governor Brian Kemp to call a special session to redraw its congressional maps. In response, Democratic leaders urged state leaders in New York to redraw their own congressional map, which will require a constitutional amendment and a referendum held in 2027. Two states: Maryland and Missouri, will hold ballot measures in the 2026 midterm elections to determine whether new congressional maps will be adopted in 2028.

== State redistricting efforts ==
=== New York ===
Initially, in 2026, multiple Democratic leaders, including Hakeem Jeffries, began to push New York Governor Kathy Hochul to respond to redistricting in Texas and other Republican states by redrawing New York's congressional districts similar to California's process; however, the state's use of an Independent Redistricting Commission was the primary obstacle to achieving the goal in time for the 2026 elections. To bypass the commission, the state house and state senate voted on one of the two constitutional amendments proposed this year, which passed on June 3, 2026. The legislature will vote again after the 2026 elections, which would then allow the state to put the amendments on a referendum in 2027. If passed, it will take effect in time for the 2028 elections.

=== Maryland ===
In 2026, Maryland attempted to redraw its congressional maps with both Governor Wes Moore and state Speaker of the House Joseline Peña-Melnyk's support. A proposed map which would make Maryland's 1st congressional district, the sole Republican district in the state more favorable for Democrats passed the state house, but state senate leader Bill Ferguson opposed the passage of such map and refused to hold a vote. However, after the Louisiana v. Callais ruling, Ferguson expressed interest in engaging in a discussion to redraw the congressional district before the 2028 elections. Such a legislative session would likely involve a proposed constitutional amendment, which would then be proposed to voters as a ballot referendum.

On July 7, 2026 a special legislative session to examine redistricting was announced to take place in August 2026. On August 4, the House of Delegates voted 96–38 and the Senate voted 32–13 to pass the redistricting amendment, placing it on the general election ballot. On August 26, a state circuit court blocked the referendum from appearing on the November ballot, the decision was appealed to the Maryland Supreme Court. On September 3, 2026, the Maryland Supreme Court ruled the ballot measure could appear on the November ballot, but ordered a wording change. Voters approved Question 3 on November 3, 2026, with approximately 60% of the vote.

== Potential expansion ==
=== Colorado ===
In Colorado, a constitutional amendment has been proposed which would give the governor (currently Democrat Jared Polis) "emergency redistricting authority" ahead of the 2028 elections. The proposed law would be triggered if "substantial evidence exists that one or more states have enacted congressional redistricting plans that result in severe partisan imbalance." The maps that have been proposed would likely flip three Republican seats and give Democrats a 7–1 majority delegation in the state.

The Colorado Supreme Court ruled on June 29, 2026, that the ballot measures proposed to allow mid-decade redistricting and new maps for 2028 and 2030 violated the single-subject rule in the Colorado Constitution. Additionally, conservatives in the state of Colorado petitioned for a ballot measure to ban any such attempt at redrawing a map mid-decade without consent from both the Colorado Supreme Court and the independent commission, which ended up qualifying for the November ballot as Amendment 86, though the amendment was rejected.

=== Mississippi ===
Governor Tate Reeves said he expects state legislators to redistrict before the 2027 Mississippi elections.

=== South Carolina ===
The South Carolina Senate rejected redistricting in 2026, but might redistrict before 2028.

=== Virginia ===
Virginia can try to redistrict with an amendment requiring legislative approval during two separate sessions. Lawmakers can try passing the first session before the 2027 Virginia elections.

=== Washington ===
In May of 2026, Washington Governor Bob Ferguson announced that he would support mid-decade redistricting if the Democrats won supermajorities in both chambers of the Washington Legislature in the 2026 elections. Currently, Washington uses an independent redistricting commission to draw the state's legislative maps, which would need a constitutional amendment to get rid of. The Democrats successfully got a supermajority in the House, but fell 3 seats short of a supermajority in the Senate.

=== Wisconsin ===
In September 2026, the Wisconsin Supreme Court heard oral arguments for a pair of Democratic lawsuits seeking to throw out the state's congressional map for the 2028 election.

In November 2026, Governor-elect David Crowley told WISN-TV that he would sign a bill that redraws Wisconsin's congressional districts if passed by the Democratic-controlled Wisconsin State Assembly in 2027.

== Failed proposals ==
=== Georgia ===
On May 13, 2026, Governor Brian Kemp called for a special session of the Georgia Legislature to redraw the state's congressional map and state legislative maps based on the U.S. Supreme Courts decision in Louisiana v. Callais. The legislative session was scheduled to start on July 17, 2026, but a few hours before the start of the session Speaker of the House Jon Burns sent a letter to the Kemp announcing that the Legislature would not consider redistricting and would instead focus on other issues. Burns cited the ongoing legal dispute over the 2021 maps which had been suspended in 2023 due to allegations that they illegally diluted the strength of Black voters. On August 25, 2026, the 11th Circuit Court remanded the 2023 suspension and ordered courts to reexamine the 2021 map in light of the Callais decision.

The new congressional map was expected to dismantle at least one majority-minority district in the state that would allow Republicans to net gain at least 1 seat in the 2028 elections.

In November 2026, after Democrat Keisha Lance Bottoms won the 2026 Georgia gubernatorial election, Kemp declined to call a special session to redraw the state's congressional map before Bottoms took office.

=== Indiana ===
Several state senators who voted against the 2025 Indiana redistricting attempt were defeated by Trump-endorsed challengers creating the possibility of redistricting before 2028. In November 2026, Indiana Governor Mike Braun told The Indianapolis Star, "I think you'd have to be an idiot to think that [mid-decade redistricting] would be resurrected in the next session."

=== Missouri ===
Map of Missouri's congressional districts used in the 2022 and 2024 congressional elections Interactive map version

Map of Missouri's congressional districts subject to the veto referendum Interactive map version

Proposition A appeared on the November 3, 2026, ballot in the state of Missouri as a veto referendum. Voters decided that congressional districts that the Missouri General Assembly adopted in 2025 will not take effect.

In September 2025, Missouri lawmakers passed—and Missouri governor Mike Kehoe signed into law—an act changing the state's congressional districts. The new districts dismantled the strongly Democratic-leaning 5th congressional district.

However, before the map took effect, it faced a lawsuit and a veto referendum. The lawsuit argued the new map was unconstitutional, and violated the part of Missouri's Constitution stating that redistricting had to occur after a United States census. But the Missouri Supreme Court disagreed, ruling 4–3 that the state constitution requires redistricting to happen after a census, but does not otherwise explicitly prohibit it.

The veto referendum, in which voters decide whether to pass or reject a law, was initiated by a group named People Not Politicians Missouri after they gathered over 300,000 signatures. Although the number of signatures submitted was sufficient, Missouri Secretary of State Denny Hoskins refused to place the measure on the ballot, stating that it was an unconstitutional measure. The Missouri Supreme Court ruled against him, ordering the veto referendum on the ballot and the use of the 2022 congressional maps during the concurrent congressional elections.

=== New Jersey ===
After the Louisiana v. Callais ruling was announced, New Jersey Governor Mikie Sherill announced her openness to redrawing the state's congressional districts, however, noted that the process would not be easy and would require a constitutional referendum. Senate president Nick Scutari also expressed interest in redrawing the map, however it is unknown whether Democrats have enough votes to go through with such proposal.

Following the 2026 elections, Sherill changed her mind and decided not to pursue redistricting, despite Democrats flipping the second district which could be hard to defend in 2028, citing dummymanders across other states.

=== Kansas ===
Republicans failed to get a veto proof majority for redistricting for the 2026 elections due to Kansas having a Democratic governor. If Republicans had flipped the 2026 Kansas gubernatorial election, they would only need a simple majority for redistricting. However, because Democrats held the governorship, redistricting will not be possible.

== See also ==
- 2020 United States redistricting cycle
- 2025–2026 United States redistricting
- Democratic backsliding in the United States
- Gerrymandering in the United States
- Political polarization in the United States
- Redistricting in the United States
