= 2026 Colorado Amendment 86 =

Amendment 86
- November 3, 2026
- Require Commission and Supreme Court Approval for Mid-Decade Congressional Redistricting Initiative
- as of 8:15 PM November 7, 2026 EST

Results
Choice	Votes	%
Yes	1,200,579	46.86%
No	1,361,552	53.14%
Total votes	2,562,531	100.00%

2026 Colorado Amendment 86 is a proposed amendment to the Colorado Constitution which will appear on the ballot on the November 3 elections. If passed it would require mid-decade redistricting to be approved by both the independent redistricting commission and the Colorado Supreme Court. The amendment needs 55% of the vote in order to be adopted.

== Background ==
In response to Republicans redistricting several seats prior to the 2026 United States House of Representatives elections, many Democrats looked to Colorado as an opportunity to gain seats back. While the Colorado Supreme Court blocked any redistricting prior to 2028, many Republicans in the state petitioned for a ballot to make gerrymandering impossible for the future.

== Contents ==
The proposition appeared on the ballot as follows:

Shall there be an amendment to the Colorado Constitution concerning congressional redistricting, and, in connection therewith, reenacting the current process for congressional redistricting in the Colorado Constitution and prohibiting modifications to a final map unless at least three public meetings are held, the modifications do not have the effect of dividing communities of interest or purposefully favoring one political party, and are approved by the congressional redistricting commission and the Colorado Supreme Court?

== See also ==
- 2027–2028 United States redistricting
- 2026 United States ballot measures
- List of Colorado ballot measures
