= Dummymandering =

Political gerrymandering effort that backfires

A comparison of the results of the 2024 (top) to the 2026 (bottom) elections to the US House in North Carolina. The boundaries for District 1 and District 3 (in the eastern part of the State) were redrawn in 2025 in an effort to flip District 1 from Democratic to Republican while making District 3 slightly less Republican (the boundaries for all other districts remained the same). The result of the boundary change achieved the opposite of the intended results, as District 1 turned out to be more Democratic and District 3 flipped from Republican to Democratic. Since the results were the opposite of the intention, the redrawing of the district boundaries has been called a "dummymander".

In politics, dummymandering (a portmanteau of dummy and gerrymandering) is a gerrymandering effort that backfires by harming the party it was meant to benefit. Originally the term was described as "a gerrymander by one party that, over the course of the decade, benefits the other party, and actually looks as if it was designed by that party rather than the party in power". Many notable examples exist in the United States, but they have also been seen in various other countries, including Hungary and Ireland.

Over time, the term has also been used to describe any election when drawing districts that backfire against the party they are designed to help, when maps are drawn without consideration for long-term partisan shifts, or where shifts happen unexpectedly over the period of the map's utilization despite being initially unforeseen, such as a wave election.

Dummymandering may occur when map makers are too confident in predicting changes in the electorate, or by being overly confident about the power of incumbency. In practice, a dummymander may occur when map makers attempt to crack votes, such as splitting large population centers into multiple districts relative to the population. Using too few districts to properly split up a large population center can cause the partisan lean of a district to be competitive in certain political environments, where potentially more seats will go to the party that was aimed to be disadvantaged by the map.

Dummymanders are most common in countries that use first-past-the-post voting systems, but have been seen in other systems including the single-transferable vote in Ireland in 1977 and Hungary's mixed member system.

== History ==
The term was first coined by political scientists Bernard Grofman and Thomas L. Brunell in 2005, in the book Redistricting in the New Millennium. In the chapter The Art of the Dummymander, the two studied many southern states in the 1990s, where Democratic controlled legislatures drew congressional and state legislative maps that would favor Democrats while also complying with the Voting Rights Act, but the maps spread Democratic voters out thinly, which let Republicans flip control of many state legislatures, including Georgia, Alabama, and Mississippi.

The term gained prominence in 2025 as mainstream media organizations and political scientists began to use the word to describe Texas's and other states' attempts to redraw their congressional maps to favor the Republican Party. The redistricting efforts left some previously safe districts competitive, and many of them flipped during the Democratic wave of the 2026 midterm elections, with losses in states with redrawn districts intended to favor Republicans, like Texas and Ohio, considered dummymanders.

== Notable examples ==
=== Ireland ===
In Ireland, a dummymander was seen in the 1977 general election. The Irish electoral system, the single transferable vote, is somewhat proportional when five seats are available in a constituency, but when only three seats are available it is less proportional. In 1974 the Labour and Fine Gael entered a coalition and amended the constituency boundaries in an attempt to limit the main opposition party, Fianna Fáil by using 3-seat constituencies in Dublin, The plan was to draw the boundaries in such a way that Labour, Fine Gael and Fianna Fáil would each receive 1 seat in each constituency, giving Fine Geal and Labour a combined 2-1 lead over Fianna Fail. However, Fianna Fáil received sufficient votes to win 2 seats in most constituencies and inverted the gerrymander, usually taking a seat that Labour had hoped to win. The failed plan became known as the 'Tullymander' after its architect, Labour TD James Tully. An independent Constituency Commission was established as a result.

=== Hungary ===
In 2026, Hungarian Prime Minister Viktor Orbán lost relection in a landslide defeat despite his Fidesz party reorganising Hungary's electoral arrangements to benefit themselves since 2014. This included gerrymandering electoral districts, malapportionment, allowing voters to cast votes outside of their home district, and undermining the compensatory list element of the electoral system. These arrangements allowed Fidesz to win two-thirds majorities in 2014, 2018 and 2022 despite not receiving a majority of the votes in 2014 or 2018. In 2026 his party was defeated by Péter Magyar and his Tisza party which gathered several opposition parties under a single joint movement which reduced vote splitting and a united front against Fidesz. The party galvanised supporters by anger at the country's pivot towards Russia, increasing authoritarianism and declining respect for the rule of law.

Fidesz had won 87/106 constituency seats in 2022, they were reduced to just 10 in 2026. The party collected a further 43 from the non-compensatory list vote. Ironically, had Fidesz maintained the pre-2014 compensatory list vote they would have won more seats and prevented Tisza from receiving a two-thirds majority. Two-thirds majorities permit amendments to the Hungarian constitution, so Fidesz's dummymander and eroding of the compensatory mechanism have allowed Tisza to set about undoing much of Orbán's legacy, including removing his close ally, President Tamás Sulyok.

=== United States ===
==== 19th century ====
During the 1894 United States elections, the Democratic Party aggressively redrew congressional districts to favor the party after the 1890 United States Census. However, they failed to take into account the Panic of 1893, in which support for the party collapsed. The Democrats subsequently lost 120 seats to the Republicans and seven seats to the Populist Party.

==== 21st century ====
In 2001, Republicans in Pennsylvania drew a congressional map that favored the party in a 12–7 majority, despite the state being competitive and voting to elect Al Gore in the 2000 Presidential election. However, many of the districts were drawn with potentially competitive margins. During the 2006 House of Representatives elections, the unpopularity of George Bush resulted in a large Democratic wave year, where Democrats in Pennsylvania were able to flip four seats resulting in a 11–8 majority. Two years later, during the 2008 United States House of Representatives elections, Democrats flipped one more seat, bringing the partisan split to a 12–7 Democratic majority.

In 2011, Democrats in Arkansas drew its congressional map to retain their 3 out of 4 seats, but ended up drawing 4 districts won by John McCain in 2008. Also in 2011, Republicans in Texas drew the Texas House of Representatives map to favor Republicans in 8 out of 14 seats in Dallas County after the 2010 United States Census. However, the Republicans in the state legislature failed to take into account population growth and demographic shifts, and during the 2018 Texas House of Representatives election, Democrats managed to flip five of the seats, bringing an even 7–7 split to a 12–2 Democratic majority. This was because when attempting to split the city of Dallas, a Democratic stronghold, with the more Republican suburbs, Republicans ended up diluting their own voter base instead.

==== 2026 United States midterm elections ====
In 2025 and 2026, Republican states were urged by President Donald Trump to “create more seats" for Republicans before the 2026 election. Following redistricting in Texas, which suggested gaining five seats, Republicans in Missouri, North Carolina, and Ohio passed new congressional district maps, in an attempt to gain 1–2 seats each. After the Louisiana v. Callais ruling by the US Supreme Court, Republicans in Florida, Tennessee, Louisiana, and Alabama also redrew their maps by diluting black voting power. However, in a setback for Republicans, the Missouri Supreme Court struck down their state's map and reinstated the 2022 map for the 2026 election.

When redrawing their maps, Republicans mainly used voting data from the 2024 presidential election to benefit from the shift of Hispanic voters to the right. Many districts that went for Trump by 30 points were reduced to 20 points or less in order to maximize pickups. However, they did not consider that Hispanic voters would swing back to Democrats in the 2026 midterm elections, resulting in Democrats maintaining or gaining seats in the heavily-Hispanic states of Florida and Texas, respectively. On the other hand, Democrats managed to gain a majority of House seats in North Carolina for the first time since 2010 and in Ohio since 2008 due in part to previously safe Republican seats being undermined by the gerrymanders, even though both maps only had minor changes from the previous ones.

In the case of North Carolina, Republican counties from the 3rd District were moved into the 1st in an attempt to gain 1 seat. However, Democrats managed to keep control of the 1st District and narrowly flipped the 3rd, a district that was considered to be uncompetitive to the point that no Democrat attempted to challenge the incumbent during the 2024 election. Additionally, the North Carolina legislature approved a map in 2023 that shifted a 7-7 split delegation into a 10-4 Republican-majority delegation in the 2024 elections after the conservative majority elected to their Supreme Court in 2022 reversed their stance on partisan gerrymandering. In 2026 the Democrats won 11 out of the 14 House seats in North Carolina, which represented an increase of 7 seats.

Attempts by Republicans to redraw maps in 2026 in Indiana and South Carolina may also have led to dummymanders in those states. In Utah, the court-imposed map for 2026, which was designed to create a compact seat in Democratic-leaning Salt Lake County, Utah, may have kept an additional seat in Republican hands. An analysis after the election found that, had the old maps been in place, Democrats would have won two of the state's four seats instead of the one seat in Salt Lake County. Another analysis shows Utah Democrats may have won 3 seats on the old map.

== See also ==
- Gerrymandering in the United States
- Redistricting in the United States
