= National Democratic Redistricting Committee =

Organization focused on redistricting in the United States

- Abbreviation: NDRC
- Founded: 2017; 9 years ago
- Headquarters: Washington, D.C., U.S.
- Key people: Eric Holder (Chairman); John Bisognano (President); Marina Jenkins (Executive Director)
- Website: democraticredistricting.com

The National Democratic Redistricting Committee (NDRC) is a US organization that focuses on redistricting and is affiliated with the Democratic Party. The organization coordinates campaign strategy, directs fundraising, organizes ballot initiatives and files lawsuits against state redistricting maps. At launch, the organization announced that it intends to support Democratic candidates for local and state offices in order for them to control congressional map drawing in the redistricting cycle following the 2020 United States census.

Former Attorney General Eric Holder serves as Chairman of the NDRC. John Bisognano serves as President, and Marina Jenkins serves as Executive Director. In 2016, President Barack Obama has said he would be involved with the organization as the main focus of his political activity after his presidency. According to NDRC senior adviser and former US Representative Mark Schauer, the organization intends to attract support from party officials, labor unions, and the America Votes coalition of progressive activists.

The NDRC is the first group within the Democratic Party to formulate a centralized strategy for gaining control of the redistricting process; in contrast, the Republican Party launched REDMAP to elect Republicans to perform redistricting during the 2010 cycle. The NDRC is organized as a not-for-profit 527 organization, analogous to a political action committee (PAC) or Super PAC. It was founded in 2016 and formally registered with the IRS on August 15. It was officially launched on January 12, 2017.

== Activities ==
In his speech to the Center for American Progress Action Fund announcing the launch of the NDRC, Holder laid out a three-point “going into the states” strategy for tackling gerrymandering, including investing in down-ballot Democratic candidates, taking legal action to reform existing maps in state and federal courts, and promoting ballot measures for independent redistricting commissions. He described gerrymandering as "the biggest rigged system in America".

In response to the launch of the NDRC, the Republican Party launched the National Republican Redistricting Trust (NRRT) in 2017. The NDRC invested $350,000 in the 2019 Wisconsin Supreme Court election in support of liberal candidates, in hopes that a liberal majority on the state supreme court may strike down gerrymandered maps in 2021.

=== 2020 United States redistricting cycle ===
For the 2020 redistricting cycle, the Republican Party controls redistricting for 187 seats in the US House of Representatives, compared to 75 seats controlled by the Democratic Party. Noting the decrease in competitive House seats, NDRC president Burton said that "what Republicans are doing is doubling down on the gerrymandering of the last decade," in reference to gerrymandering by Republicans in Texas, Ohio and North Carolina. The NDRC leads the Democrats' effort to pursue legal action to get courts to draw additional Black-majority or Black-plurality districts in Alabama, Louisiana and South Carolina.

In September 2021, the National Democratic Redistricting Committee's legal arm filed a lawsuit in the Supreme Court of Ohio challenging maps of Ohio House and Ohio Senate districts, one week after they were passed along party lines; the committee argued that the maps were gerrymandered to favor Republicans in a way which violated the state constitution. In October, the committee defended the new map of Oregon's congressional districts, which was passed by Oregon Democrats against Republican opposition in September, by arguing that it meets legal standards and was the product of bipartisan negotiation. Republicans filed a lawsuit against the Oregon map, arguing that it amounted to "a clear, egregious partisan gerrymander" in favor of Democrats.

In November, the NDRC supported plaintiffs which filed lawsuits in North Carolina alleging racial and partisan gerrymandering in the redistricting map passed by Republican state legislators in the North Carolina General Assembly. According to CBS News, the new map could lead to a congressional delegation of eleven Republicans and three Democrats from the state, compared to the existing delegation of eight Republicans and five Democrats. In December, the committee accused Erika Neuberg, the independent chair of Arizona's Independent Redistricting Commission, of being "derelict in her duties to the voters of Arizona" and "independent in name only" in making decisions which Democrats felt favored Republicans. According to Politico, the map approved by the Commission may allow the Republican Party to win six out of the state's nine seats.
