= National Republican Redistricting Trust =

Organization focused on redistricting in the United States

NRRT

The National Republican Redistricting Trust (NRRT) is an American organization founded to strengthen the Republican Party's influence in the 2020 redistricting cycle. It was launched in 2017 in response to the formation of the National Democratic Redistricting Committee (NDRC). Adam Kincaid serves as executive director and Guy Harrison serves as senior adviser.

== Formation and leadership ==
According to a memo announcing its formation, the NRRT focuses on data, legal efforts, and "[serving] as a central resource to coordinate and collaborate" on redistricting for other Republican party organizations and members. The NRRT was founded as a response to the National Democratic Redistricting Committee (NDRC), a group affiliated with the Democratic Party which was chaired by former U.S. Attorney General Eric Holder. In 2019, after losing reelection, former Governor of Wisconsin Scott Walker became finance chair of the NRRT; he tweeted that "[his] role is to counter Eric Holder’s efforts." According to Harrison, “[the NRRT's] job is redistricting. While they’re focusing on the politics, we’re moving on the legal and data aspects.”

At launch, the NRRT said that it would raise $35 million by 2020 to fight battles over redistricting. Unlike the NDRC, the NRRT does not contribute to individual candidates, but instead focuses on advising Republicans on using data and the law to shape districts. The NRRT is organized as a legal trust and is not required to disclose its donors. In September 2021, the NRRT announced former US Secretary of State Mike Pompeo and former Governor of New Jersey Chris Christie as national co-chairs of the organization.

== Activities ==
In 2018, the NRRT contributed to funding for amicus briefs which opposed legal challenges to congressional district maps in Pennsylvania and North Carolina on the basis that they were illegally gerrymandered. The briefs were joined by six Republican state election officials, including Missouri Secretary of State Jay Ashcroft.

=== 2020 redistricting cycle ===
In November 2021, Kincaid defended state legislative maps with significant advantages for Republicans in Georgia, North Carolina, Ohio and Texas, saying that the maps implemented were "reflective of the more even distribution of Republican and right-leaning voters across wider geographic areas." In December, the NRRT defended Arizona's redrawn congressional map approved by the state's redistricting commission, which according to Politico may allow Republicans to win six out of the state's nine seats. Kincaid argued that "the map achieves what Democrats say they want nationally" and that it "maximizes the number of competitive seats in Arizona."

Both the NRRT and NDRC recognize a decrease in competitive congressional districts in states which have completed redistricting as of December 2021. Kincaid defended the Republican-drawn new congressional map in Texas, which decreased the number of swing districts and attracted a legal challenge from the Biden administration, arguing that a map which protected incumbent members of Congress saves money for the Republican Party. The Republican Party opposed Democratic efforts to pass the Freedom to Vote Act, with Karl Rove, senior adviser to the NRRT, arguing that the bill "would upend the 2022 elections" and "further [undermine] people’s confidence in [the US] electoral system."

== See also ==
- REDMAP
