= 2020 United States redistricting cycle =

Allocation of United States House of Representatives districts following the 2020 United States census

The 2020 United States redistricting cycle took place following the completion of the 2020 United States census. In all fifty states, various bodies redrew state legislative districts. States that are apportioned more than one seat in the United States House of Representatives also drew new districts for that legislative body.

The rules for redistricting vary from state to state, but all states draw new legislative and congressional maps either in the state legislature, in redistricting commissions, or through some combination of the state legislature and a redistricting commission. Though various laws and court decisions have put constraints on redistricting, many redistricting institutions continue to practice gerrymandering, which involves drawing new districts with the intention of giving a political advantage to specific groups. Political parties prepare for redistricting years in advance, and partisan control of redistricting institutions can provide a party with major advantages. Aside from mid-decade redistricting, the districts drawn in the 2020 redistricting cycle will remain in effect until the next round of redistricting following the 2030 United States census.

== United States House of Representatives ==
=== Reapportionment ===
State	Seats		
State	Existing	New	Change
California	53	52	▼1
Texas	36	38	▲2
Florida	27	28	▲1
New York	27	26	▼1
Pennsylvania	18	17	▼1
Illinois	18	17	▼1
Ohio	16	15	▼1
Georgia	14	14	Steady
North Carolina	13	14	▲1
Michigan	14	13	▼1
New Jersey	12	12	Steady
Virginia	11	11	Steady
Washington	10	10	Steady
Arizona	9	9	Steady
Massachusetts	9	9	Steady
Tennessee	9	9	Steady
Indiana	9	9	Steady
Maryland	8	8	Steady
Missouri	8	8	Steady
Wisconsin	8	8	Steady
Colorado	7	8	▲1
Minnesota	8	8	Steady
South Carolina	7	7	Steady
Alabama	7	7	Steady
Louisiana	6	6	Steady
Kentucky	6	6	Steady
Oregon	5	6	▲1
Oklahoma	5	5	Steady
Connecticut	5	5	Steady
Utah	4	4	Steady
Iowa	4	4	Steady
Nevada	4	4	Steady
Arkansas	4	4	Steady
Mississippi	4	4	Steady
Kansas	4	4	Steady
New Mexico	3	3	Steady
Nebraska	3	3	Steady
Idaho	2	2	Steady
West Virginia	3	2	▼1
Hawaii	2	2	Steady
New Hampshire	2	2	Steady
Maine	2	2	Steady
Rhode Island	2	2	Steady
Montana	1	2	▲1
Delaware	1	1	Steady
South Dakota	1	1	Steady
North Dakota	1	1	Steady
Alaska	1	1	Steady
Vermont	1	1	Steady
Wyoming	1	1	Steady

Article One of the United States Constitution establishes the United States House of Representatives apportions representatives to the states based on population, with reapportionment occurring every ten years. The decennial United States census determines the population of each state. Each of the fifty states is guaranteed at least one representative, and the Huntington–Hill method is used to assign the remaining 385 seats to states based on the population of each state. Congress has provided for reapportionment every ten years since the enactment of the Reapportionment Act of 1929. Since 1913, the U.S. House of Representatives has consisted of 435 members, a number set by statute, though the number of representatives temporarily increased in 1959. Reapportionment also affects presidential elections, as each state is guaranteed electoral votes equivalent to the number of representatives and senators representing the state.

Prior to the 2022 U.S. House elections, each state apportioned more than one representative drew new congressional districts based on the reapportionment following the 2020 census. Based on the official counts of the 2020 census, California, Illinois, Michigan, New York, Ohio, Pennsylvania, and West Virginia each lost one seat, while Colorado, Florida, Montana, North Carolina, and Oregon each gained one seat, and Texas gained two seats. Though California lost a seat for the first time in its history, the 2020 census continued a broader trend of Northeastern and Midwestern states losing seats and Western and Southern states gaining seats.

Eliminated districts	Created districts
California 53; Illinois 18; Michigan 14; Montana at-large; New York 27; Ohio 16; Pennsylvania 18; West Virginia 3	Colorado 8; Florida 28; Montana 1; Montana 2; North Carolina 14; Oregon 6; Texas 37; Texas 38

=== Congressional redistricting methods ===
Congressional redistricting methods by state after the 2020 census: Independent commission Politician commission Passed by legislature with gubernatorial approval (Note: Several states, including Iowa, New York, and Utah, employ commissions that play a role in the redistricting process. However, unlike in the states labeled as "independent commission" or "politician commission", in these states the legislature has the final power to approve redistricting maps.) Passed by legislature, governor plays no role Passed by legislature, simple majority veto override Not applicable due to having one at-large district * The Ohio Constitution requires that redistricting votes in the Ohio Legislature be bipartisan, with a minimum number of votes required from both parties for a redistricting act to pass

Each U.S. representative represents one congressional district, which encompasses all or part of a single state. Following the apportionment of seats based on the most recent census, every state with more than one congressional district must pass a new redistricting plan before the filing deadlines of the next general election. In most states, the state legislature draws the new districts, but some states have established redistricting commissions. Arizona, California, Colorado, Idaho, Michigan, and Washington use independent commissions to draw House districts, while Hawaii and New Jersey use "politician commissions" to draw House districts. Alaska, Delaware, North Dakota, South Dakota, Vermont and Wyoming will continue to have only one representative in the House, and so will not have to draw new House districts.

In all other states, the legislature draws district lines, although some states have advisory commissions that can play a major role in drawing lines, and other states have backup commissions if the state legislature is unable to draw the lines itself. State governors may also play a role in deciding district boundaries. In many states, districts are drawn with the intent to benefit certain political groups, including one of the two major political parties, in a practice known as gerrymandering. Most states draw new lines by passing a law the same way any other law is passed, but some states have special procedures. Connecticut and Maine require a two-thirds super-majority in each house of the state legislature for redistricting plans, while district lines are not subject to gubernatorial veto in Connecticut and North Carolina. The Ohio redistricting process is designed to encourage the legislature to pass a map with bipartisan support, but the majority party can pass maps that last for four years (as opposed to the normal ten years) without the support of the minority party. The legislatures of Alabama, Indiana, Kentucky, Tennessee, and West Virginia can override gubernatorial vetoes with a simple majority vote, giving governors in those states little leverage in the drawing of new district maps.

==== Limits on congressional redistricting ====
Though the states have wide latitude in the re-drawing of congressional districts, state power over redistricting is subject to limits set by the U.S. Constitution, rulings of the federal judiciary and statutes passed by Congress. In the case of Wesberry v. Sanders, the Supreme Court of the United States established that states must draw districts that are equal in population "as nearly as is practicable." Subsequent court cases have required states to redistrict every ten years, although states can redistrict more often than that depending on their own statutes and constitutional provisions. Since the passage of the Uniform Congressional District Act (Pub. L. 90–196, 81 Stat. 581, enacted December 14, 1967), most states have been barred from using multi-member districts; all states use single-member districts. The Voting Rights Act of 1965 establishes protections against racial redistricting plans that would deny minority voters an equal opportunity to elect representatives of their choice. The Supreme Court case of Thornburg v. Gingles established a test to determine whether redistricting lines violate the Voting Rights Act. In some states, courts have required the creation of majority-minority districts.

In addition to standards required by federal law, many states have also adopted other criteria, including compactness, contiguity, and the preservation of political subdivisions (such as cities or counties) or communities of interest. Some states, including Arizona, Colorado, New York and Washington require the drawing of competitive districts.

=== Control of congressional redistricting ===
Partisan control of congressional redistricting after the 2020 elections, with the number of U.S. House seats each state received: Democratic control Republican control Split or bipartisan control Independent redistricting commission No redistricting necessary

==== Congressional redistricting plans passed by legislature ====
The table shows the partisan control of states in which congressional redistricting is enacted through either a bill or a joint resolution passed by the legislature. States in which the governor can technically veto the bill, but that veto can be overridden by a simple majority of the state legislature, are marked as "simple maj. override".

Partisan control of congressional redistricting
State	Seats	Partisan control			
State	Seats	Overall	Governor	Senate	House
Alabama	7	Republican	Simple maj. override	Republican	Republican
Arkansas	4	Republican	Republican	Republican	Republican
Connecticut	5	Split*‡	No veto	Democratic	Democratic
Florida	28	Republican	Republican	Republican	Republican
Georgia	14	Republican	Republican	Republican	Republican
Illinois	17	Democratic	Democratic	Democratic	Democratic
Indiana	9	Republican‡	Simple maj. override	Republican	Republican
Iowa	4	Republican†	Republican	Republican	Republican
Kansas	4	Republican	Democratic↑	Republican	Republican
Kentucky	6	Republican	Simple maj. override	Republican	Republican
Louisiana	6	Republican	Republican	Republican	Republican
Maine	2	Democratic	Democratic	Democratic	Democratic
Maryland	8	Democratic	Democratic↑	Democratic	Democratic
Massachusetts	9	Democratic	Democratic↑	Democratic	Democratic
Minnesota	8	Split	Democratic	Democratic	Republican
Mississippi	4	Republican	Republican	Republican	Republican
Missouri	8	Republican	Republican	Republican	Republican
Nebraska	3	Nonpartisan	Republican	Nonpartisan	
Nevada	4	Split	Republican	Democratic	Democratic
New Hampshire	2	Republican	Republican	Republican	Republican
New Mexico	3	Democratic	Democratic	Democratic	Democratic
New York	26	Democratic*	Democratic	Democratic	Democratic
North Carolina	14	Republican	No veto	Republican	Republican
Ohio	15	Republican†	Republican	Republican	Republican
Oklahoma	5	Republican	Republican	Republican	Republican
Oregon	6	Democratic	Democratic	Democratic	Democratic
Pennsylvania	17	Split	Democratic	Republican	Democratic
Rhode Island	2	Democratic†	Democratic	Democratic	Democratic
South Carolina	7	Republican	Republican	Republican	Republican
Tennessee	9	Republican	Simple maj. override	Republican	Republican
Texas	38	Republican	Republican	Republican	Republican
Utah	4	Republican†	Republican	Republican	Republican
West Virginia	2	Republican	Simple maj. override	Republican	Republican
Wisconsin	8	Split	Democratic	Republican	Republican

"*" indicates that a 2/3 super-majority vote is required in the legislature
"↑" indicates that one party can override a gubernatorial veto because of a supermajority in the legislature
"†" indicates that the state employs an advisory commission
"‡" indicates that the state employs a back-up commission

Ohio requires certain qualified majorities, at each stage of its congressional redistricting process, for its congressional maps to endure (subject to judicial review) for the full decade.

==== Congressional redistricting plans passed by commissions ====
States with redistricting commissions
State	Seats	Type
Arizona	9	Independent commission
California	52	Independent commission (Overriden by California Proposition 50)
Colorado	8	Independent commission
Idaho	2	Independent commission
Hawaii	2	Politician commission
Michigan	13	Independent commission
Montana	2	Independent commission
New Jersey	12	Politician commission
Virginia	11	Hybrid commission
Washington	10	Independent commission

Five states with multiple members of the House of Representatives use independent commissions to draw congressional districts. In Arizona, Montana, and Washington, the four party leaders of the state house and state senate each select one member of the Independent Redistricting Commission, and these four members select a fifth member who is not affiliated with either party. In California, the Citizen's Redistricting Commission consisted of five Democrats, five Republicans, and four individuals who are not members of either party, this was until California Proposition 50 passed. In Idaho, the four party leaders of the state house and state senate and the chairmen of the two most popular state parties (based on the results of the most recent gubernatorial vote) each select a member of the Commission for Reapportionment.

Two states use politician commissions to draw congressional districts. In Hawaii, the president of the state senate and the speaker of the state house each select two members of the Reapportionment Commission, while the minority parties in both chambers each appoint two members of the commission. The eight members of the commission then select a ninth member, who also chairs the commission. In New Jersey, the four party leaders of the state house and state senate and the party leaders of the two largest parties each choose two members of the Apportionment Commission, and the twelve members of the commission select a thirteenth member to chair the commission.

One state, Virginia, uses a hybrid, bipartisan commission consisting of eight legislators and eight non-legislator citizens. The commission is evenly divided between Democrats and Republicans.

Ohio employs a hybrid commission as a back-up redistricting authority in the case of the state legislature failing to achieve a certain qualified majority for approval of a map. The commission is composed of elected political officials as well as appointments made by the leaders of the state legislative chambers (namely: the speaker of the house, the leader of the largest party in the house to which the speaker of the house does not belong, the president of the senate, and the leader of the largest party in the senate to which the speaker of the senate does not belong), although those appointments also were politicians in the 2020 cycle. If the redistricting commission fails to achieve a certain qualified majority for approval of a congressional redistricting plan when it has been charged to do so, the authority to pass such a plan transfers back to the state legislature, which may then pass a plan either for the full decade via a certain qualified majority, or for only four years via normal legislative procedure otherwise.

== State legislatures ==
=== Legislative redistricting methods ===
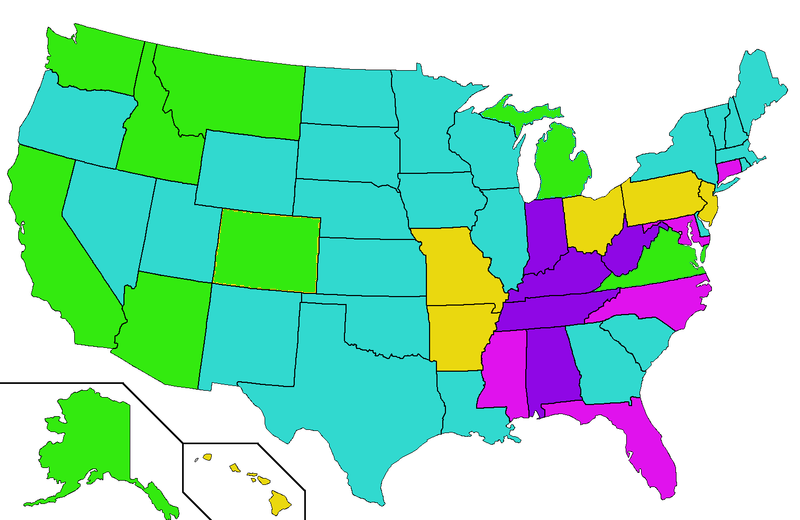
State legislative redistricting methods by state: Independent commission Politician commission Passed by the legislature with gubernatorial approval Passed by legislature with no gubernatorial veto Passed by legislature, simple majority veto override

Each state draws new legislative district boundaries every ten years. Every state except Nebraska has a bicameral legislative branch. Nebraska is also unique in that it has the only legislative body that is officially non-partisan. Most states must pass redistricting plans by the time of the filing deadlines for the 2022 elections. The exceptions are Virginia and New Jersey, which must pass new plans in 2021, Louisiana and Mississippi which have a 2023 deadline, and Montana, which has a 2024 deadline.

Fifteen states use independent or politician commissions to draw state legislative districts. In the other states, the legislature is ultimately charged with drawing new lines, although some states have advisory or back-up commissions. Connecticut, Illinois, Mississippi, Oklahoma, and Texas have backup commissions that draw district lines if the legislature is unable to agree on new districts. Iowa, Maine, New York, Rhode Island, and Vermont employ advisory commissions. In Oregon, the Secretary of State will draw the legislative districts if the legislature fails to do so. In Connecticut and Maine, a 2/3 super-majority vote in each house is required to create new districts, while in Connecticut, Florida, Maryland, Mississippi, and North Carolina, the governor cannot veto redistricting plans. The legislatures of Alabama, Indiana, Kentucky, Tennessee, and West Virginia can override gubernatorial vetoes with a simple majority vote, giving governors in those states little leverage in the drawing of new district maps.

==== Limits on state legislative redistricting ====
The states have wide latitude in re-drawing legislative districts, but the U.S. Supreme Court case of Reynolds v. Sims established that states must draw districts that are "substantially equal" in population to one another. Federal court cases have established that deviation between the largest and smallest districts generally cannot be greater than ten percent, and some states have laws requiring less deviation. Court cases have also required states to redistrict every ten years, although states can redistrict more often than that depending on their own statutes and constitutional provisions. States are free to employ multi-member districts, and different districts can elect different numbers of legislators. The Voting Rights Act of 1965 establishes protections against racial redistricting plans that would deny minority voters an equal opportunity to elect representatives of their choice. The Supreme Court case of Thornburg v. Gingles established a test to determine whether redistricting lines violate the Voting Rights Act.

Many states have also adopted other criteria, including compactness, contiguity, and the preservation of political subdivisions (such as cities or counties) or communities of interest. Some states, including Arizona, require the drawing of competitive districts, while other states require the nesting of state house districts within state senate districts.

=== Control of legislative redistricting ===
Partisan control of state legislative redistricting after the 2020 elections: Democratic control Republican control Split or bipartisan control Independent redistricting commission

==== State legislative redistricting plans passed by legislature ====
The table shows the partisan control of states in which state legislative redistricting is enacted via a bill passed by the legislature. States in which the governor can technically veto the bill, but that veto can be overridden by a simple majority of the state legislature, are marked as "simple maj. override".

Partisan control of state governments
State	Control	Governor	State Senate	State House
Alabama	Republican	Simple maj. override	Republican	Republican
Connecticut	Split*‡	No veto	Democratic	Democratic
Delaware	Democratic	Democratic	Democratic	Democratic
Florida	Republican	No veto	Republican	Republican
Georgia	Republican	Republican	Republican	Republican
Illinois‡	Democratic	Democratic	Democratic	Democratic
Indiana	Republican‡	Simple maj. override	Republican	Republican
Iowa	Republican†	Republican	Republican	Republican
Kansas	Republican	Democratic↑	Republican	Republican
Kentucky	Republican	Simple maj. override	Republican	Republican
Louisiana	Split	Democratic	Republican	Republican
Maine	Split*†	Democratic	Democratic	Democratic
Maryland	Democratic	Republican↑	Democratic	Democratic
Massachusetts	Democratic	Republican↑	Democratic	Democratic
Minnesota	Split	Democratic	Republican	Democratic
Mississippi	Republican‡	No veto	Republican	Republican
Nebraska	Nonpartisan	Republican	Nonpartisan	
Nevada	Democratic	Democratic	Democratic	Democratic
New Hampshire	Republican	Republican	Republican	Republican
New Mexico	Democratic	Democratic	Democratic	Democratic
New York	Democratic*†	Democratic	Democratic	Democratic
North Carolina	Republican	No veto	Republican	Republican
North Dakota	Republican	Republican	Republican	Republican
Oklahoma	Republican‡	Republican	Republican	Republican
Oregon	Democratic	Democratic	Democratic	Democratic
Rhode Island	Democratic†	Democratic	Democratic	Democratic
South Carolina	Republican	Republican	Republican	Republican
South Dakota	Republican	Republican	Republican	Republican
Tennessee	Republican	Simple maj. override	Republican	Republican
Texas	Republican‡	Republican	Republican	Republican
Utah	Republican†	Republican	Republican	Republican
Vermont	Split†	Republican	Democratic	Democratic
West Virginia	Republican	Simple maj. override	Republican	Republican
Wisconsin	Split	Democratic	Republican	Republican
Wyoming	Republican	Republican	Republican	Republican

An * indicates that a 2/3 super-majority vote is required in the legislature
A ↑ indicates that one party can override a gubernatorial veto because of a super-majority in the legislature
A † indicates that the state employs an advisory commission
A ‡ indicates that the state employs a backup commission

==== State legislative redistricting plans passed by commission ====
States with redistricting commissions
State	Type	Partisan control
Alaska	Independent	—N/a
Arizona	Independent	—N/a
Arkansas	Politician	Republican
California	Independent	—N/a
Colorado	Independent	—N/a
Hawaii	Politician	Bipartisan
Idaho	Independent	—N/a
Michigan	Independent	—N/a
Missouri	Politician	Bipartisan
Montana	Independent	—N/a
New Jersey	Politician	Bipartisan
Ohio	Politician	Republican
Pennsylvania	Politician	Democratic
Virginia	Hybrid	Bipartisan
Washington	Independent	—N/a

Eight states use independent commissions to draw state legislative districts. In Alaska, the governor appoints two individuals and the Speaker of the House, senate president, and Chief Justice of the Alaska Supreme Court each appoint one individual to the Redistricting Board. In Arizona, Montana, and Washington, the four legislative party leaders each appoint one member to the redistricting commission, and these four individuals choose a fifth member to chair the commission. California's Citizen's Redistricting Commission consists of five Democrats, five Republicans, and four individuals who are not members of either party. Idaho's Commission for Reapportionment consists of six individuals appointed by the chairmen of the two largest parties (based on the most recent gubernatorial vote) and the four state legislative party leaders.

Six states use politician commissions to draw state legislative districts. Arkansas's Board of Apportionment consists of the governor, secretary of state, and attorney general. The Ohio Redistricting Commission consists of the governor, auditor, secretary of state, and four individuals appointed by the state legislative party leaders. Hawaii's Reapportionment Commission consists of eight appointees of the state legislative party leaders, and these appointees select a ninth member to chair the commission. The New Jersey Apportionment Commission consists of twelve individuals appointed by the state legislative party leaders and the two major party chairmen, with these twelve individuals choosing a thirteenth member to chair the board. Pennsylvania's redistricting commission consists of four appointees chosen by the state legislative party leaders, and these four appointees choose a fifth member to chair the commission. In Missouri, a commission is created for each legislative chamber as a result of the governor picking from lists submitted by the leaders of the two major parties.

One state, Virginia, uses a hybrid, bipartisan commission consisting of eight legislators and eight non-legislator citizens. The commission is evenly divided between Democrats and Republicans.

== Final disposition ==
Final drawer of maps for 2022 U.S. House of Representatives elections: Democratic drawn Republican drawn (Note: Louisiana is labeled as Republican because the Democratic governor vetoed the maps but was overridden with almost no Democratic votes) Split or bipartisan drawn (Note: Maryland is labeled as bipartisan because the Republican governor signed the Democratic-controlled legislature's maps after a court overturned a Democratic gerrymander as a deal to drop the legislature's appeal) Independent redistricting commission drawn No redistricting necessary Court drawn

This table shows the final status of redistricting in each state.

State	U.S. House seats	U.S. House disposition	State legislative disposition
California	52	Passed into law on December 27, 2021	Passed into law on December 27, 2021
Texas	38	Passed into law on October 25, 2021*	Passed into law on October 25, 2021*
Florida	28	Passed into law on April 22, 2022*	
New York	26	Passed into law on February 3, 2022; Overturned on March 31, 2022	Passed into law on February 3, 2022
Pennsylvania	17	Passed into law on February 23, 2022	Passed into law on February 4, 2022
Illinois	17	Passed into law on November 23, 2021	Passed into law on September 24, 2021
Ohio	15	Passed into law on November 20, 2021*; Overturned by state Supreme Court on January 14, 2022	Passed into law on September 16, 2021; Overturned by state Supreme Court
Georgia	14	Passed into law on December 30, 2021*	Passed into law on December 30, 2021*
North Carolina	14	Passed into law on February 23, 2022	Passed into law on February 23, 2022
Michigan	13	Passed into law on December 28, 2021*	Passed into law on December 28, 2021
New Jersey	12	Passed into law on December 22, 2021*	Passed into law on February 18, 2022
Virginia	11	Passed into law on December 28, 2021	Passed into law on December 28, 2021
Washington	10	Passed into law on February 8, 2022	Passed into law on February 8, 2022
Arizona	9	Passed into law on December 22, 2021	Passed into law on December 22, 2021
Massachusetts	9	Passed into law on November 22, 2021	Passed into law on November 4, 2021
Tennessee	9	Passed into law on February 6, 2022	Passed into law on February 6, 2022
Indiana	9	Passed into law on October 4, 2021	Passed into law on October 4, 2021
Maryland	8	Passed into law on April 4, 2022	Passed into law on January 27, 2022*
Missouri	8	Passed into law on May 18, 2022	
Wisconsin	8	Passed into law on March 3, 2022	Passed into law on March 3, 2022
Colorado	8	Passed into law on November 1, 2021	Passed into law on November 15, 2021
Minnesota	8	Passed into law on February 15, 2022	Passed into law on February 15, 2022
South Carolina	7	Passed into law on January 26, 2022*	Passed into law on December 10, 2021
Alabama	7	Passed into law on November 4, 2021*	Passed into law on November 4, 2021
Louisiana	6	Passed into law on March 30, 2022	Passed into law on March 14, 2022
Kentucky	6	Passed into law on January 20, 2022*	Passed into law on January 21, 2022
Oregon	6	Passed into law on September 27, 2021	Passed into law on September 27, 2021
Oklahoma	5	Passed into law on November 22, 2021	Passed into law on November 22, 2021
Connecticut	5	Passed into law on February 10, 2022	Passed into law on November 23, 2021
Utah	4	Passed into law on November 12, 2021	Passed into law on November 16, 2021
Iowa	4	Passed into law on November 4, 2021	Passed into law on November 4, 2021
Nevada	4	Passed into law on November 16, 2021*	Passed into law on November 16, 2021*
Arkansas	4	Passed into law on January 14, 2021	Passed into law on November 29, 2021
Mississippi	4	Passed into law on January 25, 2022	
Kansas	4	Passed into law on February 9, 2022*	Passed into law on April 15, 2022
New Mexico	3	Passed into law on December 17, 2021*	Passed into law on January 6, 2022*
Nebraska	3	Passed into law on September 30, 2021	Passed into law on September 30, 2021
Idaho	2	Passed into law on November 5, 2021	Passed into law on November 5, 2021
West Virginia	2	Passed into law on October 22, 2021	Passed into law on October 22, 2021
Hawaii	2	Passed into law on January 28, 2022	Passed into law on January 28, 2022
New Hampshire	2	Passed into law on May 31, 2022	
Maine	2	Passed into law on September 29, 2021	Passed into law on September 29, 2021
Rhode Island	2	Passed into law on February 18, 2022	Passed into law on February 18, 2022
Montana	2	Passed into law on November 12, 2021	
Delaware	1	—N/a	Passed into law on November 2, 2021
South Dakota	1	—N/a	Passed into law on November 10, 2021
North Dakota	1	—N/a	Passed into law on November 12, 2021*
Alaska	1	—N/a	Passed into law on November 10, 2021*
Vermont	1	—N/a	Passed into law on April 6, 2022
Wyoming	1	—N/a	Passed into law on March 25, 2022

An * indicates that litigation is pending as of that date against the finalized maps

== Litigation ==
Lawsuits have been filed against a number of passed congressional and legislative maps on the grounds of either racial gerrymandering or partisan gerrymandering. These states include Alabama, Alaska, Arkansas, Georgia, Idaho, Illinois, Maryland, Michigan, Nevada, New Jersey, New Mexico, North Carolina, Ohio, South Carolina and Texas. As more states continue to adopt maps through the redistricting process, the number of lawsuits filed will potentially increase.

=== Racial gerrymandering ===
Lawsuits have been filed in multiple states against congressional and state legislative maps due to claims that the new maps disenfranchise minority voters.

In Alabama, four lawsuits were filed against the congressional and state legislative maps, alleging racial bias and violation of the Voting Rights Act of 1965 (VRA) by diluting the power of minority voters in the state. On January 24, 2022, a three-judge panel blocked Alabama's congressional maps over claims it likely violates the VRA. The panel argued that because African Americans counted for a considerable percentage of the total population growth, there should be more opportunities for representation. On February 7, 2022, the Supreme Court temporarily reinstated Alabama's congressional map and added Alabama's appeal to their 2022 case list, with the hearing date yet to be decided. On June 8, 2023, the Supreme Court upheld the lower court's decision, ruling in Allen v. Milligan that Alabama did in fact illegally dilute the power of Black voters. The Alabama Legislature defied the Supreme Court, drawing a map with only a single Black-majority district, rather than the ruling's minimum two districts.

The NAACP and American Civil Liberties Union sued multiple state officials in Arkansas over the new state House districts, arguing that they unconstitutionally underrepresented Black voters. A Trump appointed US District judge ruled that the groups did not have standing, and stated that the plaintiff must be the US Attorney General in February, 2022. The ACLU appealed the ruling following the decision by the United States Department of Justice not to intervene. US Senator Tom Cotton filed an amicus brief with the court supporting the state of Arkansas, calling racial gerrymandering accusations "baseless". Two lawsuits were also filed against Arkansas's congressional districts, arguing that the map disenfranchised black voters by splitting Pulaski County between three congressional districts and moving 23,000 black voters out of Arkansas's 2nd congressional district.

In Georgia, staff attorneys at the Southern Poverty Law Center claimed that, "the maps produced out of the special legislative session block Georgia's communities of color from obtaining political representation that reflects their population growth". The American Civil Liberties Union of Georgia filed suit in December 2021, alleging that both state legislative maps and congressional maps violated the VRA. Specifically, the 6th, 13th, and 14th congressional districts were challenged. In March 2022, Judge Steve C. Jones allowed Georgia's congressional and state legislative maps to take effect for the 2022 Georgia state elections even though he believed that it was likely "that certain aspects of the State's redistricting plans are unlawful." Despite this, he decided that overturning Georgia's maps so close to the May primary would prove overly disruptive. Later, in October 2023, Judge Jones found that Georgia's maps did illegally discriminate against Black voters, ordering the state to create an additional majority-Black district. A map was later drawn that protected both the Republican delegation of seats and added a majority-minority district.

In Michigan, on March 23, 2022, a group of nineteen African-American Detroiters who live in thirteen different Michigan House and Senate districts in portions of Detroit sued the Michigan Independent Citizens Redistricting Commission ("MICRC") for violating the Equal Protection Clause of the United States Constitution and the Voting Rights Act. On December 21, 2023, a three-judge panel of the United States District Court for the Western District of Michigan determined that the MICRC "overwhelmingly - indeed, inescapably" drew the boundaries of the plaintiffs' districts predominantly on the basis for race. The three-judge panel enjoined further use of the Michigan House and Michigan Senate maps drawn by the MICRC and ordered the maps to be redrawn.

In Texas, the League of United Latin American Citizens and others filed a lawsuit against congressional and state legislative maps after they had passed the state legislature, but before they had been signed into law. They argued that despite over 50% of Texas's population growth over the past ten years being due to Hispanic citizens, the maps not only failed to add new Hispanic majority districts, but also eliminated several existing districts, violating the Voting Rights Act. Republican state legislators claim that the maps were drawn without taking race into account, and that their legal counsel had previously advised them that the maps were legal under federal law. In December 2021, the Department of Justice also filed a lawsuit against Texas's new congressional and state house maps, arguing that they "were drawn with discriminatory intent".

=== Partisan gerrymandering ===
In Maryland, new congressional maps were vetoed by Governor Larry Hogan for being "disgracefully gerrymandered", but the Maryland state legislature overrode his veto on December 9, 2021. Subsequently, two Republican aligned groups sued to overturn the new congressional maps, arguing that they were partisan gerrymanders that "cracked" Republican voters across several districts, diluting their voting power. Primaries in the state were delayed to July 19 due to the ongoing litigation. On March 25, 2022, a circuit court judge threw out the congressional districts, calling them an "extreme gerrymander" that disenfranchised multiple communities of interest.

New York's congressional, state assembly, and state senate districts were thrown out by a New York state judge on March 31, 2022, for violating a state Constitutional provision banning partisan gerrymandering. On April 21, 2022, a New York appeals court upheld the ruling that New York's congressional maps were drawn with illegal partisan intent, but they reinstated the state assembly and state senate districts. Upon a second appeal by the state Democratic party, The New York State Court of Appeals found that the congressional and state senate districts were "drawn with impermissible partisan purpose." As such, both maps were found unconstitutional, and Carnegie Mellon University post-doctoral fellow Jonathan Cervas was appointed as an independent special master to draw new maps. Federal Judge Gary L. Sharpe of the Northern District of New York delayed New York's congressional and state senate primaries to August in May 2022, rejecting an argument from state Democrats that the primary must take place in June, and so it was too late to redraw new maps. He called the argument "a Hail Mary pass, the object of which is to take a long-shot try at having the New York primaries conducted on district lines that the state says is unconstitutional".

The Supreme Court of Ohio overturned initially passed state legislative maps, arguing that they unfairly favored Republicans against the guidance of Ohio's 2015 redistricting amendment that seeks to limit partisan gerrymandering.

The Republican Party of New Mexico sued to overturn the new congressional maps, arguing that they unduly favor Democrats and dilute Republican voting strength, thereby violating the equal protection clause of the New Mexico state constitution. New Mexico Governor Michelle Lujan Grisham characterized the congressional map as one "in which no one party or candidate may claim any undue advantage." However, on October 6, 2023, the New Mexico Supreme Court ruled the gerrymander wasn't egregious enough to the extent it was illegal.

In February 2022, the North Carolina Supreme Court struck down both state legislative maps and the congressional map initially passed by the state legislature in November 2021, citing partisan gerrymandering that violated the state Constitution. As a result, the North Carolina legislature drafted new maps, which they submitted to the court for approval. A three-judge panel of the court upheld the legality of both state legislative maps, but had court-appointed special masters redraw the congressional map, which was released and approved in February 2022.

=== Racial and partisan gerrymandering ===
Alexander v. South Carolina State Conference of the NAACP is the first partisan gerrymandering case taken by the United States Supreme Court after its landmark decision in Rucho v Common Cause which stated that partisan gerrymandering claims present political questions beyond the reach of the federal courts, and the first racial gerrymandering case, after the court's landmark decision in Allen v Milligan. However, the case ruled that South Carolina's maps were not unconstitutional, making it tougher to overturn racially gerrymandered maps.

=== Court-run redistricting ===
State supreme courts have selected or drafted new congressional maps in Connecticut, Minnesota, North Carolina, New Hampshire, Pennsylvania, Virginia, and Wisconsin following the failure of redistricting panels or lawmakers to pass new maps in each state.

The Connecticut Supreme Court was forced to take over the congressional redistricting process after the bipartisan legislative panel deadlocked and failed to agree on new maps. The court appointed Nathaniel Persily, who drew Connecticut's 2010 maps, as special master to draw the new congressional districts. Persily drew a least-change map, making only the adjustments necessary to ensure equal population in each congressional district. The court adopted Persily's recommended map on February 10, 2022.

In North Carolina, local and state courts took over the congressional redistricting process in February 2022. After initial congressional and legislative maps were ruled as unconstitutional partisan gerrymanders, several nonpartisan redistricting experts including Robert H. Edmunds Jr., Thomas W. Ross, and Robert F. Orr were appointed as special masters by the state Supreme Court. They were tasked with reviewing whether the second iteration of state legislative and congressional maps passed by the North Carolina legislature violated state Constitution provisions opposing partisan gerrymandering. The special masters in coordination with the Wake County Superior Court found that the new congressional map was unconstitutional, and instead implemented their own map on February 23, 2022. North Carolina House Speaker Tim Moore called the process "egregious" and "unconstitutional", and accused the court of drawing the maps "in an unknown, black-box manner".

Following the failure of the Minnesota Legislature to pass either congressional or state legislative districts by the mandated February 5, 2022, deadline, the Minnesota Supreme Court appointed a five-member commission to draw new boundaries. The panel released the state's new maps later in February.

== Mid-decade redistricting ==
States which have undergone mid-decade redistricting prior to the 2026 elections.: Voluntary redistricting enacted Voluntary redistricting rejected / Court-ordered/mandatory redistricting Redistricting challenge rejected

In July 2025, states in the United States began considering mid-decade redistricting proposals. These efforts marked one of the largest coordinated attempts to redraw congressional districts between decennial censuses in modern American history.

Texas was the first state to consider redrawing their maps which was approved on August 29, 2025 after a prolonged quorum break by Democrats in the Texas House of Representatives. The new map potentially shifted five seats from Democrats to Republicans. After a legal battle which went up to the Supreme Court, the maps were allowed to stay in place.

During their quorum break Texas Democrats traveled to states with Democrat-led state legislatures, lobbying them to start their own redistricting efforts to counteract any gains produced by a partisan gerrymander. California passed new maps to do just this on August 21, 2025. However unlike Texas, California had to pass a constitutional amendment to allow the maps to go into effect. Proposition 50 was approved by the voters in a November special election.

Other states soon followed suit in their own redistricting efforts. The 2025 initiatives emerged amid heightened polarization in U.S. politics. Following the 2024 elections, control of the U.S. House of Representatives was narrowly divided, prompting both major political parties to pursue strategies to maximize their representation ahead of the 2026 midterm elections. Commentators described the wave of proposals as a “redistricting arms race,” with Republican-led states and Democratic-led states seeking to counterbalance each other’s changes.

Following the Supreme Court's 2026 Louisiana v. Callais decision, which limited challenges to gerrymandered maps using the Voting Rights Act of 1965, several more Southern states joined the redistricting wave.

=== List of states ===
Map of North Carolina's congressional districts to be used from the 2026 elections, per SB 249 passed by the North Carolina General Assembly on October 22, 2025

This is a list of states which passed new congressional maps including the expected partisan shift:

State	Legislation passed	Anticipated net change	Result of 2026 election
Alabama	May 8, 2026 (court ordered injunction on map removed June 2, 2026)	R+1	±0
California	August 21, 2025 (proposition passed November 4, 2025)	D+5	D+5
Florida	May 4, 2026	R+4	±0
Louisiana	May 29, 2026	R+1	TBD (Note: Two districts in Louisiana are headed to a runoff election, which will be held on December 12, 2026)
North Carolina	October 22, 2025	R+1	D+5
Ohio	redistricting commission passed October 31, 2025	R+2	D+3
Tennessee	May 7, 2026	R+1	±0
Texas	August 29, 2025 (court approved December 4, 2025)	R+5	D+1
Utah	October 6, 2025 (court ordered map issued November 10, 2025)	D+1	D+1
Missouri	September 28, 2025 (ennactment paused by courts, proposition rejected)	R+1	D+1
Virginia	January 16, 2026 (proposition passed April 21, 2026, results invalidated by the courts)	D+4	D+2
Net (Note: AP News 2026 United States House of Representatives election results as of 11 November 2026, 00:46:00 UTC.)		R +6 seats	D +18 seats

== Redistricting organizations and funds ==
Democrats were particularly unhappy with the results of the 2012 House elections in which Democratic House candidates received more votes than Republican House candidates, but Republicans retained control of the chamber. Organizations such as the Democratic Governors Association and the Democratic Legislative Campaign Committee have established funds dedicated to helping Democrats in the 2020 round of redistricting. Democrats also established the National Democratic Redistricting Committee to coordinate Democratic redistricting efforts. Republicans established a similar group, the National Republican Redistricting Trust.

== Changes to the redistricting process between 2012 and 2022 ==
=== Federal court rulings ===
In the 2013 case, Shelby County v. Holder, the Supreme Court struck down Section 4(b) of the Voting Rights Act, which was a coverage formula that determined which states and counties required preclearance from the Justice Department before making changes to voting laws and procedures. The formula had covered states with a history of minority voter disenfranchisement, and the preclearance procedure was designed to block discriminatory voting practices. In the 2019 case of Rucho v. Common Cause, the Supreme Court held that claims of partisan gerrymandering present nonjusticiable political questions that cannot be reviewed by federal courts.

In another 2019 case, Department of Commerce v. New York, the Supreme Court blocked the Trump administration from adding a question to the 2020 census regarding the citizenship of respondents.

=== State court rulings ===
In 2015, the Supreme Court of Florida ordered the state to draw a new congressional map on the basis of a 2010 state constitutional amendment that banned partisan gerrymandering.

In 2018, the Pennsylvania Supreme Court threw out the 2011 U.S. House of Representatives map on the grounds that it violated the state constitution; the court established new redistricting standards requiring districts to be compact and to minimize the splitting of counties and towns.

In 2019, a North Carolina state court struck down the state's legislative districts on the grounds that the district had been created with the partisan intent of favoring Republican candidates.

In 2022, the Ohio Supreme Court struck down the state's congressional and legislative districts multiple times.

=== Ballot measures ===
In 2015, Ohio voters approved a ballot measure changing the composition of the commission charged with drawing state legislative districts, adding two legislative appointees to the commission and creating rules and guidelines designed to make partisan gerrymandering more difficult. In May 2018, Ohio voters approved a proposal that modified the state's congressional redistricting processes.

In 2018, voters in Colorado and Michigan approved of a proposal to establish an independent redistricting commission for congressional and state legislative districts in their respective states. In Utah, voters approved the creation of a redistricting commission to draw congressional and state legislative districts, though the Utah state legislature retains the power to reject these maps.

In 2020, voters in Virginia approved the establishment of a bipartisan redistricting commission for both congressional and state legislative redistricting. The commission consists of eight legislators and eight non-legislator citizens, with the commission split evenly between Democrats and Republicans.

In 2018, Missouri voters approved of a proposal to have a non-partisan state demographer draw state legislative districts, but in 2020 Missouri voters approved a second referendum eliminating the state demographer position and restoring the system in place prior to the 2018 referendum.

== See also ==
- 2017, 2018, 2019, 2020, and 2021 United States elections
- Gerrymandering in the United States
- Redistricting in the United States
- Electoral geography
